= List of Indigenous newspapers in North America =

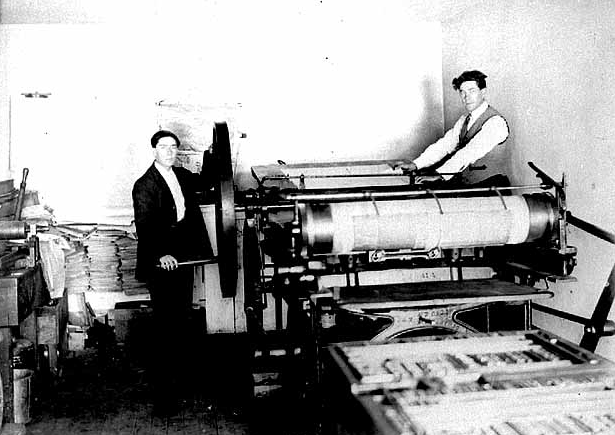
Press room of The Tomahawk, White Earth Indian Reservation, 1903

This list of Indigenous newspapers in North America is a dynamic list of newspapers and newsletters edited and/or founded by Native Americans and First Nations and other Indigenous people living in North America. These newspapers report on newsworthy events, and topics of interest to a range of Native communities and other readers. Most of these listings are still actively publishing, although some are no longer active. The Library of Congress holds most of the defunct publications in their collection.

== A ==
- Adahooniligii (Navajo Nation) former newspaper written mostly in Diné bizaad, the Navajo language between 1943–1957. Back issues can be accessed via the Library of Congress.
- Agi Panuuna Yadooa (Summit Lake Paiute Tribe)
- Ag’wanermiut kasitaq, (Afognak Native Village), Alaska
- Akwesasne Notes, Mohawk Nation of Akwesasne, Ontario, Quebec, New York (1968–1998)
- Ak-Chin O'odham Runner (Ak Chin Indian Community), Maricopa, Arizona
- Alabama-Coushatta Tribe of Texas Newsletter, (Alabama-Coushatta Tribe of Texas)
- Alaska Native News ("For the First People of the Last Frontier")
- APTN National News (Winnipeg, Manitoba, Canada)
- Anchorage Native News (community education publication produced by Southcentral Foundation of Alaska)
- Anishinabek News (monthly community newspaper is produced by the Communications Unit of the Anishinabek Nation at the head office in Nipissing First Nation)
- Anishinaabeg Today (White Earth Nation)
- Apache Drum Beat alternate name Apache drumbeat (San Carlos Apache Indian Reservation) former newspaper published by the San Carlos Apache Tribal Council. Published 1959–1967. Founded in 1959, after its predecessor, the Apache Newsletter, from earlier in the 1950s. Back issues can be accessed via the Library of Congress.
- A:shiwi A:wan Messenger and Ashiwi News (published by Zuni Pueblo) a newsletter of the Zuni people
- Au-Authm Action News (Salt River Pima-Maricopa Indian Community)

== B ==
- Ba-Yak the Talking Raven (Quileute Nation), La Push, Washington
- The Bacone Indian and The Baconian, Bacone College, Muskogee, Oklahoma
- Bah Kho-Je Journal, Iowa Tribe of Oklahoma, Perkins, OK
- Bay Mills News, Bay Mills Indian Community
- Birch Creek Tribal Council Newsletter, Birch Creek Tribe, Alaska
- Biskinik, (Choctaw Nation of Oklahoma), Durant, Oklahoma
- Bishop Paiute Tribe Newsletter, Bishop Paiute Tribe
- Bois Forte News, Bois Forte Band of Chippewa

== C ==
- Char-Kootsa News, the official news of the Flathead Reservation
- Chaticks si Chaticks - Pawnee Nation News (Pawnee Nation of Oklahoma)
- Cherokee Phoenix (Cherokee Advocate) and Cherokee Voices, Tahlequah, Oklahoma
- The Circle: Native American News and Arts, (newspaper with an Indigenous perspective based in Minneapolis)
- Cheyenne and Arapaho Tribal Tribune, (bi-monthly news publication for tribal citizens), El Reno, Oklahoma
- Choctaw Community News (Mississippi Band of Choctaw Indians)
- Chickasaw Times, (official publication of the Chickasaw Nation), Ada, Oklahoma
- Cokv Tvlvme (Poarch Band of Creek Indians)
- Cokv Tvlvme (Seminole Nation of Oklahoma)
- Comanche Nation News (Comanche Nation), Lawton, Oklahoma
- Coyote Valley Tribal News (Coyote Valley Band of Pomo Indians), Redwood Valley, CA

== D ==
- Dakota Tawaxitku Kin, alternative name The Dakota Friend former newspaper published both Dakota and English languages between 1850–1852, Saint Paul, Minnesota
- Da’luk (Wiyot Table Bluff Rancheria)
- DeBahJiMon, Leech Lake Band of Obijwe, Cass Lake, MN
- Delaware Indian News, Delaware Tribe of Indians, Bartlesville, OK
- The Discourse, journalism to underserved communities, including Indigenous communities in British Columbia
- Duckwater Quarterly Newsletter, Duckwater Shoshone Tribe, Duckwater, NV

== E ==
- The Eastern Door (Kahnawake (Mohawk), Canada)
- Eehisi iiyaayankwi (Peoria Tribe of Oklahoma)
- Elwha News, (Lower Elwha Klallam Tribe) ʔéʔɬx̣ʷaʔ nəxʷsƛ̕áy̕əm̕ – The Strong People, Port Angeles, Washington

== F ==
- First Nations Drum newspaper (Canada's largest Indigenous newspaper)
- The Fort Apache Scout alternate name Apache Scout (White Mountain Apache Tribe), Whiteriver, Arizona

== G ==
- Gah’nahvah yah ti’ (Yavapai-Apache Nation)
- Gah-Yah-Tont (Seneca-Cayuga Nation)
- Gadua Cherokee News (United Keetowah Band of Cherokee Indians)
- Gallup Sun, news coverage of Navajo Nation, Pueblo, and Apache tribes
- Gallup Independent, Gallup, NM
- Gam-yu, Hualapai Tribe of Arizona, Peach Springs, AZ
- Giduwa Cherokee News, United Keetoowah Band of Cherokee Indians, Stillwell, OK
- Gila River Indian News, Gila River Indian Community, Sacaton, AZ
- Gyah’-Wish Atak-Ia - The Turtle Speaks (Wyandotte Nation)

== H ==
- Hannahville Happenings, Hannahville Indian Community, Bark River, MI
- Ha-Shilth-Sa, Canada's oldest First Nation's Newspaper, and is the "newspaper of record" of the Nuu-chah-nulth people, published by the Nuu-chah-nulth Tribal Council, West Coast Vancouver Island, BC
- High Country News, received 23 National Native media awards
- Hocak Worak, Ho-Chunk Nation, Black River Falls, WI
- Hoh Tribe Newsletter, Hoh Tribe, Forks, WA
- Hopi Action News, Hopi Tribe, Hopitutskwa, AZ
- Hopi Tutuveni, Hopi Tribe Kykostmovi, AZ
- Hownikan, Citizen Potawatomi Nation, Shawnee, OK

== I ==
- IndiJ Public Media (Founded as the Lakota Times newspaper)
- Indian Country Today (an enterprise of the Oneida Nation of New York, covers the Indigenous world, including American Indians, Alaska Natives and First Nations)
- Indianz.com, owned by Noble Savage Media, LLC and Ho-Chunk, Inc., Winnebago, NE
- Isleta Pueblo News, Isleta Pueblo Isleta, NM

== J ==
Jamul Newsletter, (Jamul Indian Village), one of 12 federally recognized tribes that make up the Kumeyaay Nation of Southern California.

== K ==
- Kalihwisaks (Oneida Nation of Wisconsin)
- Kanza News, (Kaw Nation)
- Kawennì:ios (Good Words) (Saint Regis Mohawk Tribe)
- Kawerak, (Kawerak, Inc. Bering Strait Native Association) Bering Strait region, Northwest Alaska, just south of the Arctic Circle
- Klah-Che-Min (Squaxin Island Tribe)
- Klamath News, Klamath Tribal News Dwaa nee pqa (what’s happening), (Klamath – Modoc – Yahooskin)
- KTO news, (Kickapoo Tribe of Oklahoma) monthly newsletter
- Ku'ku'kwes (news website dedicated to covering Indigenous news in Atlantic Canada)

== L ==
- Lakota Times, Pine Ridge Reservation, South Dakota
- Little River Currents (Little River Band of Ottawa Indians)

== M ==
- Manataba Messenger (Colorado River Indian Tribes, a federally recognized tribe consisting of the four distinct ethnic groups associated with the Colorado River Indian Reservation: the Mohave, Chemehuevi, Hopi, and Navajo), published in Parker, Arizona
- Meskwaki Nation Times (Meskwaki Nation)
- Me-Ya-Whae, Agua Caliente Band of Cahuilla Indians
- Miami Nation News (Miami Tribe of Oklahoma)
- Miisaniinawind (Red Cliff Band of Lake Superior Chippewa)
- Mohican News (Stockbridge-Munsee Community)
- Muckleshoot Monthly (Muckleshoot Indian Tribe)
- Mvskoke Media, (voice of the Mvskoke people) publisher of Muscogee Nation News,

== N ==
- Nahgahehiwanog Dibahjimowinnau, Grand Traverse Band of Ottawa and Chippewa Indians, Peshawbestown, MI
- Namps Chaahts and Námsčáć Newsletter (Shoalwater Bay Tribe)
- Nangka Wittu (Timbisha Shoshone)
- National Native News, Koahnic Broadcasting Corp. Albuquerque, NM
- Native Nevadan, Inter-Tribal Council of Nevada
- Native News Online, a subsidiary of Indian Country Media
- The Native Press (Independent news organization)
- Native Public Media, (based in Flagstaff, AZ)
- Native Times News, (formerly the Oklahoma Indian Times)
- The Native Tribe of Kanatak (Native Tribe of Kanatak) Wasilla, Alaska
- Navajo-Hopi Observer, Flagstaff, AZ
- Navajo Post, Tempe, AZ, serving the Navajo Nation, Arizona and New Mexico
- Navajo Times, (Navajo Nation), Window Rock, AZ, founded in 1959
- News from Native California, intertribal magazine, Berkeley, CA
- NTC Newsletter (Ninilchik Village Tribe, Niqnalchint qayeh kenu)
- Northern News Services Limited (news aggregator published by Northern News Services, including Northwest Territories News, Nunavut News, the Yellowknifer)
- Nuniaq News, Alutiiq Tribe of Old Harbor
- Nunatsiaq News, newspaper of record for Nunavut and the Nunavik territory of Quebec)

== O ==
- Odawa Trails, (Little Traverse Bay Bands of Odawa Indians)
- Oklahoma Indian Times (see Native American Times above)
- O'odham Action News, Salt River Pima-Maricopa Indian Community
- Organized Village of Kasaan Tribal Newsletter (Organized Village of Kasaan)
- Osage News, Osage Nation, Pawhuska, Oklahoma

== P ==
- Papago Indian News (Papago Tribe), former newspaper published 1954–1963, Sells, Arizona. Back issues can be accessed via the Library of Congress.
- Pokegnek Yajdanawa (Pokagon Band of Potawatomi Indians)
- Potawatomi News (Prairie Band Potawatomi Nation)
- The Progress (White Earth Indian Reservation) former newspaper published from 1886–1889, back issues can be accessed via the Library of Congress
- Pueblo de San Ildefonso Bulletin (San Ildefonso Pueblo)

== Q ==
- Quapaw Tribal News (Quapaw Tribe)

== R ==
- Rawhide Press (Spokane Tribe, City of Spokane, Washington)
- Red Rocks Reporter, (Jemez Pueblo), New Mexico

== S ==
- Sacramento Bee
- Sac & Fox News (Sac and Fox Nation)
- The Seminole Tribune, official newspaper of the Seminole Tribe of Florida. In 1989, the newspaper won the Robert F. Kennedy Journalism Award, becoming the first Indigenous newspaper to win this award. In 2019 the Seminole Tribune received a National Native Media Award.
- Seneca Nation publications: AASP/JOM newsletter, ECLC newsletter, Health Newsletter, Higher Education, Seneca Language Newsletter, Seneca Nation Library News (Seneca Nation of Indians)
- Shawnee Journal (Shawnee Tribe)
- Siletz News - Duu Lhlan Wee-ya (Confederated Tribes of Siletz Indians),
- S.I.R. Tribal News (Susanville Indian Rancheria)
- Skitkomiq nutacomit, Houlton Band of Maliseet Indians, Littleton, ME
- Smoke Signals (Confederated Tribe of Grande Ronde), Grand Ronde, Oregon
- Smoke Signals (Kaibab Band of Paiute Indians), Fredonia, Arizona
- Snee-Nee-Chum (Nooksack Indian Tribe)
- Sounder (Skokomish Indian Tribe)
- Sota Iya Ye Yapi - SWO Executives (Sisseton Wahpeton Oyate) of the Lake Travis Reservation
- The Southern Ute Drum (Southern Ute Tribe, Colorado, New Mexico) In 2019 the Southern Ute Drum received a National Native Media Award.
- Strong People, (Jamestown S'Klallam Tribe of Washington)
- Su’Nu’Nu’Shinal, (Kashia Band of Pomo Indians)
- The Supai Weekly News (Havasupai Reservation) former newspaper published during the 1950s ending in 1958.
- Suquamish News (Suquamish Tribe)
- Syecem (Port Gamble S’Kallam Tribe)

== T ==
- Tangirnaq Times (Tangirnaq Native Village) Woody Island, Alaska
- Te-Moak News (Te-Moak Tribe of Western Shoshone)
- The Tomahawk, former newspaper published 1903–1926, "the official organ of the Minnesota Ojibwe"
- Tribal Business News (A subsidiary of Indian Country Media)
- Tribal Tribune (tribal newspaper owned by the federally-recognized Confederated Tribes of the Colville Reservation, received a 2019 National Native Media Award.
- Tribal News (Tlingit and Haida Indian Tribes of Alaska) published by the Tlingit and Haida Central Council
- Tribal Observer (Saginaw Chippewa Tribal Nation)
- Tu-Kwa Hone Newsletter, Burns Paiute Tribe
- Turtle Island News (based out of the Grand River Territory of the Six Nations)
- The Two Row Times, news publication, Ontario Indigenous peoples as well as Haudenosaunee peoples of the US

== V ==
- Voice of CTCLUSI (Confederated Tribes of Coos, Lower Umpqua & Siuslaw Indians), Coos Bay, Oregon

== W ==
- Wa? Biba? ?am Muse?es Isge; Wasi siw (Washoe Tribe)
- Wasatun wi, (Lower Sioux Indian Community)
- Wawatay News (published in both English and Indigenous languages of northern Ontario, including Ojibway, Oji-Cree, and Cree)
- Wiikwedong Dazhi-Ojibwe, (Keweenaw Bay Indian Community)
- Wichita and Affiliated Tribes Newsletter (Wichita and Affiliated Tribes) Wichita, Waco, Keechi, Tawakoni tribes
- Win Awenen Nisitotung, the Sault Tribe Newspaper (Sault Ste. Marie Tribe of Chippewa Indians, Sault Ste. Marie, Michigan)
- Windspeaker, owned by the Aboriginal Multi-Media Society of Alberta.

- CFWE First Nations radio is operated by Windspeaker and publishes transcripts of their programs.

- Winnebago Indian News (Winnebago Tribe of Nebraska)
- Worage (Otoe-Missouria Tribe)

== Y ==
- Yooyoola!, (Cowlitz Indian Tribe), Longview, WA

== See also ==
- Native American newspapers
- Native American journals
- Native American Journalists Association
- List of Indigenous periodicals in Canada
- Indigenous Journalists Association
