= Patty Talahongva =

Native American journalist, documentary film maker and news executive

- Qotsak-ookyangw Mana
- Born: Patricia A. Talahongva; 1962 (age 63–64); Denver, Colorado, U.S.
- Citizenship: American
- Occupations: journalist, news executive
- Years active: 1979–present
- Website: pattytalahongva.com

Patty Talahongva (native name: Hopi language Qotsak-ookyangw Mana, born 1962) is a Hopi journalist, documentary producer, and news executive. She was the first Native American anchor of a national news program in the United States and is involved in Native American youth and community development projects. A past president of the Native American Journalists Association, she was the recipient of their Medill Milestone Achievement Award in 2016. In 2019, she was hired as the news executive for the national television news program developed by Indian Country Today at Arizona State University.

== Early life ==
Patricia A. Talahongva, or Qotsak-ookyangw Mana (white spider girl) in the Hopi language, was born in 1962 in Denver, Colorado. Though her Certificate of Degree of Indian Blood states she is four-fourths Hopi, Talahongva acknowledges Tewa ancestry as well. Her parents had been relocated from the Hopi Reservation in Arizona, under a federal program that sought to assimilate Native Americans into mainstream society by relocating them to urban areas. Her father worked in King's Bakery, but when she was four, her parents and sister returned to their village, Songoopavi in Second Mesa, Arizona so that the girls would not lose their cultural heritage. Talahongva' upbringing was complicated because her parents wanted their six children to participate in their native culture and religion but they also did not want them to struggle with the stigma they had faced. Because of this, she had both a Catholic and Hopi upbringing and did not learn the Hopi language as a child, but instead was taught English.

Talahongva attended public school off the reservation. When her father died, her mother returned to school and earned a master's degree, becoming an English teacher. Because of her busy schedule, she sent Talahongva and one of her sisters to the Native American residential school in Phoenix. Between 1978 and 1979, she attended the Phoenix Indian School and then transferred in 1979 to Flagstaff High School, graduating in 1980. She furthered her education, first attending Northern Arizona University and then transferring to the Walter Cronkite School of Journalism and Mass Communication at Arizona State University.

== Career ==
While she was attending the Phoenix boarding school, she began working as a youth reporter for the Phoenix Gazette and also started working at KOAI-TV station in Flagstaff. Though she was a teenager, FCC regulations required having a representative of the Navajo or Hopi people on staff since the station was broadcast on their reservations. Reporting on the 1980 United States presidential election, she became interested in politics, and also reported on world events like the Iran hostage crisis. When she was attending university, she worked at the Phoenix zoo as a public relations assistant and in 1986, was hired as public relations manager of Chanen Shocket Communications. She married an Anglo, with whom she had her son Nick, who was raised in the Hopi tradition. The couple divorced after fourteen years of marriage.

In 2002, Talahongva became the first Native American anchor for a national news broadcasting company, when she was hired at Village America. That year, she was elected as president of the Native American Journalists Association and was re-elected for a second term the following year. By 2005, she was the host and managing editor of the national radio broadcast, Native America Calling, which was headquartered at station KUMN 89.9 on the campus of the University of New Mexico. She also served as managing editor for National Native News. That year, she worked with filmmaker Dustinn Craig (White Mountain Apache/Diné) on a series of public service announcements via a children's media workshop. The purpose of the workshops was to expose Native youth to opportunities in broadcasting. In 2006, she was recognized for her work "Native Gay Pride" by the National Lesbian & Gay Journalists Association. After participating in the symposium "Hear Our Story" in Washington, D.C. in 2006, where she expressed concern over disenrolling African-Native Americans, she was fired from Native America Calling in 2007.

Talahongva founded White Spider Communications and worked as an independent journalist producing Native American news stories and articles for journals and magazines, like Native Peoples, and began producing documentaries. She has covered many national news stories, including the 1992 Los Angeles riots, sparked by the verdict in the beating of Rodney King; the 1993 hantavirus epidemic, breaking the story for KTVK in Phoenix a week before it became national news; the 2003 renaming of Piestewa Peak for Hopi soldier Lori Piestewa killed in the Iraq War; the 2004 opening of the Smithsonian's National Museum of the American Indian; and the 2013 Yarnell Hill Fire, in which 19 City of Prescott firefighters lost their lives. Among those she has interviewed are Notah Begay, Anquan Boldin, Hillary Clinton, Wilma Mankiller, and Willie Nelson, as well as others.

In 2013, Talahongva became the curator of the Phoenix Indian School Visitor Center, a heritage center opened after the boarding school closed. The Center aimed to reinforce the importance of culture and preserve the history of the school, including the period when Native culture was suppressed. In 2016, she was honored by the Native American Journalists Association with the NAJA-Medill Milestone Achievement Award for lifetime contributions to journalism. Acting as an advisor to the Heard Museum she was one of the curators of "Away From Home: American Indian Boarding School Stories", which was exhibited in 2019. That year, Indian Country Today founded a nationwide news broadcast station at the Walter Cronkite School of Journalism and Mass Communication, selecting Talahongva as executive producer for their news broadcasting.

In addition to her work in journalism, Talahongva has served on the boards for the Center for Native American Youth and for the Hopi Education Endowment Fund, leading many student projects. Besides her two years as president of the Native American Journalists Association, she served in various other capacities on the board. She has also served on the board of directors for UNITY: Journalists of Color, Inc.

== Selected works ==
- 2001 Lady Warriors, assistant producer, winner of Best Documentary at the 2001 American Indian Film Festival, Best Native Film at the 2002 Santa Fe Film Festival, among other awards.
- 2006 The Power of Words: Native Languages as Weapons of War, director and producer, part of the holdings of the Smithsonian National Museum of the American Indian The documentary includes the stories of Comanche, Hopi, Meskwaki, and Navajo code talkers and took almost three years to produce. It is one of the Smithsonian's traveling exhibits.
- 2011 V-Day 11.11.11, collaborator and co-director Of the over 50 segments submitted to "tell the collective experience of being a veteran", 15 were selected for inclusion in the final production.
- 2018 “No More ‘Die Bread’: How Boarding Schools Impacted Native Diet and the Resurgence of Indigenous Food Sovereignty,” Journal of American Indian Education, Vol. 57, No. 1 (Spring 2018), pp. 145–153. https://www.jstor.org/stable/10.5749/jamerindieduc.57.1.0145
