= Native American newspapers =

U.S. news publications published by Native American people

Native American newspapers are news publications in the United States published by Native American people often for Native American audiences. The first such publication was the Cherokee Phoenix, started in 1828 by the Cherokee Nation. Although Native American people have always written for state and local newspapers, including the official publications of Native American boarding schools, periodicals produced by Native people themselves were relatively few and far between until the 20th century.

By mid-20th century, Native American people began to move into urban areas in larger numbers, especially after the mass relocations pursued as part of U.S. Indian relocation policy. Intertribal urban publications then began to appear in cities including Boston, Chicago, and Los Angeles. The rise of the Red Power movement further prompted Native people to express their self-determination through periodical publication, both on and off-reservation. Nowadays many tribal nations have their own newsletters and newspapers, including digital publications.

== History ==
=== 19th century ===
The Cherokee Nation initially published the Cherokee Phoenix in its capital New Echota, in what is now the state of Georgia. The first editor was Elias Boudinot, who traveled throughout the United States to raise funds for a printing press. Using the Cherokee syllabary invented by Sequoyah, Boudinot and his colleagues printed the paper in both Cherokee and English, side by side. In 1835, the state of Georgia seized the press before forcibly removing the tribe to what is now Oklahoma during the Trail of Tears. In 1844, the Cherokee nation again began publishing a newspaper, this time as the Cherokee Advocate. The title "Cherokee Phoenix" was restored in 2000, and the paper continues to this day in digital and broadsheet formats.

Other early Native American newspapers include a considerable number of papers published in the Hawaiian language between in 1834 and 1948. Initially published by missionaries as instruments of colonialism, these papers also became important vehicles for Native Hawaiians to express their agency and resistance. On the White Earth Reservation in Minnesota, Gus Beaulieu and Theodore Beaulieu, both Ojibwe, published a weekly English-language paper called The Progress from 1886 to 1889.

In 1897, Cherokee writer Ora Eddleman Reed bought the Muskogee Morning Times and the next year founded the monthly Twin Territories: The Indian Magazine.

=== 20th century ===
The decline of newspapers is now a widely remarked phenomenon, but periodical publishing of all kinds has often been interrupted by financial and other considerations. Like other magazines and newspapers, some Native American periodicals were ephemeral. One example is The Narragansett Dawn, a magazine published by members of the Narragansett Tribe in Rhode Island only between 1935 and 1936.

After the Cherokee Phoenix, the second regularly circulating Native-language newspaper was Ádahooníłígíí, published in Arizona from 1943 to 1957. This newspaper, printed entirely in Navajo, was produced by the Bureau of Indian Affairs rather than the tribe itself. In 1959, the Navajo Tribal Council started publishing the English-language Navajo Times, the first daily newspaper published and owned by a tribal nation.

Native American journalists are vastly underrepresented in mainstream media, and the majority of them work in tribal enterprises. At times, the sponsorship of tribal publications by tribal governments has led to censorship. This happened with the Navajo Times, which the tribal government shut down during the 1980s for questioning tribal authority. Shortly thereafter, the paper started up again as a free and separate press. Other tribal nations including the Cherokee and Osage have also sought to create independent presses.

Many tribal newspapers are published on reservations, often in English. Examples include

- the Ak-Chin O'odham Runner, Ak-Chin Indian Community, Maricopa, AZ (1987-)
- Akwesasne Notes, Mohawk Nation, Akwesasne, NY/ON/QC (1968-1998)
- Hopi Action News, Hopi Tribe, Hopitutskwa, AZ (1966-)
- Lakota Times, Pine Ridge Indian Reservation, SD (1981-)
- Osage News, Osage Nation, Pawhuska, OK (1983-)

During the 1950s, with more and more Native Americans moving or being relocated to urban areas, intertribal newspapers began to appear in cities. Some of these came out of urban Indian centers that were established to respond to the new influx of tribal people. In 1951 the Los Angeles Indian Center, which had been founded in the 1930s, started a newsletter called Talking Leaf, which eventually became a full-fledged newspaper. It reported community news like births and weddings while also publicizing the Indian Center's activities. The American Indian Center in Chicago published numerous newsletters including the Chicago Warrior and American Indian Center News; it inspired other urban Indian centers to follow suit. Many urban newspapers of this period also reported on the activities of the American Indian Movement. The North American Indian Center of Boston, then called the Boston Indian Council, published a newspaper called The Circle from 1976 to 1984, included articles about one of the center's most active members, Anna Mae Aquash.

=== 21st century ===
Like most newspapers, contemporary Native American newspapers exist in a mix of print and digital formats, or have migrated entirely online. Some longstanding publications, like the Navajo Times, persist in print precisely because broadband access is so spotty on many reservations. Others morphed into larger enterprises: The Lakota Times, started by Oglala Lakota journalist Tim Giago on the Pine Ridge Reservation, became Indian Country Today, reflecting a more national focus, and then became the Indian Country Today Media Network. The paper, which has gone through several changes in funding sources and ownership, is today one of the biggest outlets for Native American news in the United States.

Born-digital Native American news sites include Native News Online, established in 2011 to cover national news that affects Native American people. Indianz.com is published by Visionmaker Media, a large nonprofit that specializes in television and video.

== See also ==
- List of Indigenous newspapers in North America
- List of newspapers in the United States
- Native American Journalists Association
