= National Indian Education Association =

U.S. nonprofit organization

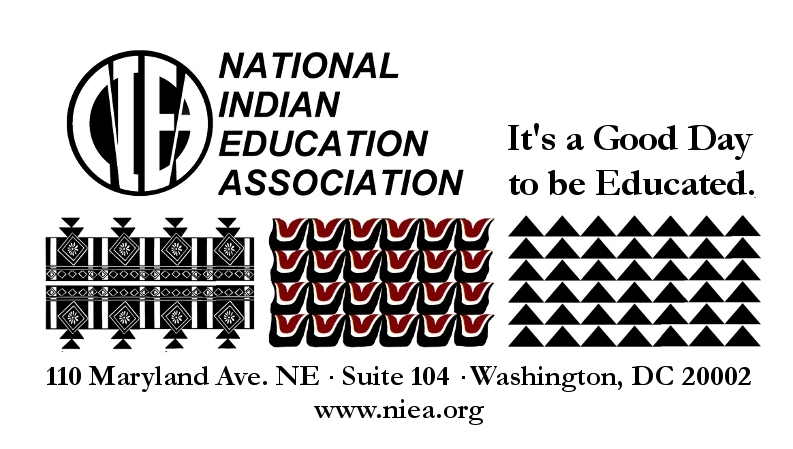
NIEA logo

The National Indian Education Association (NIEA) is the only national nonprofit exclusive to education issues for American Indian, Alaska Native, and Native Hawaiian people of the United States.

== History ==
In March 1969, Sparlin Norwood, Cherokee, a teacher at Central Junior High School in Bartlesville, Oklahoma, organized a National Conference of Indian teachers at the Warm Springs Indian Reservation in Oregon, as part of his National Education Association position.

In 1969, Rosemary Christensen organized a National Conference on Indian education as part of her work at the Upper Midwest Regional Educational Laboratory (UMREL) located in Minneapolis. The planning committee members were primarily from the greater Minneapolis area but the participants came from different parts of the country and agreed that such a conference should be held again. At the conclusion of this first conference Christensen was asked by the Minnesota group to discuss the idea of national organization of Indian educators while at the Convocation of American Indian Scholars, held at Princeton University in March 1970.

Jeannette Henry Costo and Rupert Costo, with a Ford Foundation grant, helped plan the First Convocation of American Indian Scholars. This brought together a mix of Indian educators that were actively involved in the education of Native students in elementary, secondary schools, and university programs. Sparlin Norwood, William Demmert, and Rosemary Christensen attended this conference. The mix of Indian educators found a common interest and formed a discussion group to consider future activity that would bring them together periodically to address national Indian education issues and to learn from each other. The leading organizers of this discussion group included Sparlin Norwood, Hershal (Ace) Shamant, Marigold Linton, Rosemary Christensen, John Winchester, Liz Whiteman, Dillon Platero, and William Demmert and Ned Hatathli, who would all become members of the first "National Indian Education Association" Board of Directors. There were other participants that participated as observers and discussants including George Scott, Carl Downing, Sam Billison, Lee Antell and several others.

This group decided on being an independent organization, and chose "National Indian Education Association" (NIEA) as the name under which it would be incorporated. Rosemary Christensen was assisted by Gordon J. Amundson to file papers for incorporation. The officers, the board members, and other organizational requirements were carried out at the 1970 National Indian Education Association Conference.

The NIEA was incorporated on August 21, 1970 (File number 1646), in Minneapolis, Minnesota. The original signatures of the incorporation papers were Rosemary Christensen, Elgie Raymond, and Will Antell.
