= KKWE =

- White Earth, Minnesota; United States
- Broadcast area: Northwestern Minnesota
- Frequency: 89.9 MHz
- Branding: 89.9 Niijii Radio

Programming
- Format: Variety
- Affiliations: AMPERS; NV1; Pacifica radio

Ownership
- Owner: White Earth Land Recovery Project

History
- First air date: November 11, 2011
- Call sign meaning: "White Earth"

Technical information
- Licensing authority: FCC
- Facility ID: 174165
- Class: C1
- ERP: 60,000 watts
- HAAT: 97 meters
- Transmitter coordinates: 46°53′57″N 95°31′14″W

Links
- Public license information: Public file; LMS
- Webcast: Listen live
- Website: www.niijiiradio.com

KKWE (89.9 FM) is a radio station licensed to serve White Earth, Minnesota. The station is owned by the White Earth Land Recovery Project, a Native American-run nonprofit organization. It airs a variety of music and talk programming, much of which is native-oriented. KKWE's studios are located in the town of Callaway, which is north of Detroit Lakes on Highway 59.

The station was assigned the KKWE call letters by the Federal Communications Commission on May 19, 2010, and was granted its license to cover on November 16, 2011. The station's format, and the Niijii Radio brand, were launched at 11:11 am on November 11, 2011 (11/11/11).

In addition to locally produced programs, KKWE carries programming from Pacifica Radio such as Democracy Now; as well as Native Voice One programs, such as Native America Calling and National Native News.

== Exit from, and return to, the airwaves ==
After reportedly suffering a variety of hardships (transmitter failure and burglary and vandalism at the studio) KKWE went dark sometime in late summer 2012. WELRP made public their hopes to resolve the outstanding issues and put the station back on the air in the near future.

According to the station's website, KKWE was able to return to the air on the morning of November 11, 2012.

KKWE is a community radio station funded through memberships, grants, and underwriting support. A large amount of in- kind support comes from numerous volunteers.

== See also ==
- List of community radio stations in the United States
