= Avis Red Bear =

Native American journalist

Avis Red Bear (née Little Eagle) is an American journalist and the founder of the Teton Times, an independent Native American newspaper. She is a member of the Standing Rock Sioux Tribe.

== Career ==
Red Bear studied Mass Communications and Native Studies at Black Hills State University, and ultimately graduated from Sitting Bull College in 1987.

Red Bear began her journalism career at the Lakota Times in 1990, where her reporting included a 10-part series exposing fake medicine men and women. The late Tim Giago, founder of the Lakota Times, called the series "one of the major accomplishments in Indian journalism." Over the ensuing decade, Red Bear rose from news reporter to managing editor of the Lakota Times. Red Bear came up with the paper's current name, Indian Country Today, which the paper adopted in 1992.

In 2002, Red Bear founded the Teton Times in McLaughlin, South Dakota. The Teton Times primarily serves the Standing Rock Sioux Tribe, which is composed of the Lakota and Dakota nations of the Standing Rock Reservation The Teton Times publishes a weekly print paper and maintains a Facebook page, but does not have an official website. Red Bear has said that many of her readers don't have internet access, so "her printed paper is the only way they know what's going on with local government or whose kids made the honor roll."

Unlike many Native newspapers, the Teton Times is independent, rather than being owned by the tribal government of the area it serves. Tim Giago has identified the Teton Times as one of the "most read, most influential of these independent newspapers." In the report American Indian Media Today, Jodi Rave emphasizes the importance of independent ownership: "Press freedom for tribe-owned media is a key challenge faced by Native American media. Tribal governments remain the largest media owners and control an estimated 72 percent of newspapers and radio stations."

In 2005, Red Bear ran for office within the Standing Rock Sioux Tribe, and became the first woman elected to be vice president. When President Barack Obama visited the Standing Rock Sioux Tribal Nation in 2014, Red Bear expressed concerns about the proposed expansion of the Keystone Pipeline, which would have had an impact on her tribe's land. She was present at the Pow Wow held in his honor at Cannon Ball, North Dakota. As of 2023, she has been a councilwoman at-large on the Tribal Council of Standing Rock Sioux Tribe for 22 years.

Red Bear was elected to the board of the Native American Journalists Association in 2019. She is also a member of the board of trustees for Sitting Bull College.

== Personal life ==
Red Bear has five children, with fourteen grandchildren and four great grandchildren. She lives on the Standing Rock Indian Reservation.

== Awards and nominations ==
- 2017, nominated for the Spirit of Dakota Award
