= Terri Crawford Hansen =

Terri Crawford Hansen (born 1953) is a journalist who focuses primarily on environmental and scientific issues affecting North American tribal and worldwide indigenous communities. Hansen, an enrolled Native American citizen of the Winnebago Tribe of Nebraska is a correspondent for YES! Magazine and Indian Country Today, and contributes to Earth Island Journal, Pacific Standard, High Country News, VICE News, PBS, BBC News and other news publications. Hansen maintains an online public service news project titled Mother Earth Journal.

== Education and Honors ==
Hansen attended Portland State University while employed at The Oregonian, from which she retired in 1992. In 2014 she was selected a National Association of Science Writers Diverse Scholar Fellow. That same year she also was a Fellow of the Robert R. McCormick Foundation. She was a 2010 Climate Media Fellow of the Earth Journalism Network in which she reported the Sixteenth session of the Conference of the Parties (COP16) United Nations Climate Summit from Cancun, Mexico. She received a 2009 Fellowship from the National Press Foundation; and 2009 and 2010 Fellowships from the Association of Health Care Journalists. She received funding in 2009 from the International Funders for Indigenous Peoples to report the COP15 UN Climate Summit from Copenhagen, Denmark. She was a 2008 "Project Word" journalism grant recipient. She was a 1994 Fellow of the Society of Environmental Journalists.

== Books ==
Co-author, Water in the 21st Century West, Oregon State University Press, 2008. Co-author, The Encyclopedia of North American Indians, Marshall Cavendish Reference Books, Tarrytown, NY, 1997.

== Memberships ==
Hansen is a member of Investigative Reporters and Editors, the Association of Health Care Journalists, the Native American Journalists Association, the Earth Journalism Network, the Society of Environmental Journalists, and the Wordcraft Circle of Native Writers and Storytellers. As a member of the Association of Health Care Journalists, she requested with other journalists that the U.S. Food and Drug Administration (FDA) end current practices that restrict the public's access to health information.

== Personal life ==
Hansen was born and raised in Portland, Oregon. She lives in Whidbey Island, Washington. She has one daughter, Danielle Hansen.

== Awards ==
- Native American Journalists Association 2018 'Excellence in Journalism' Media Awards: First Place Excellence in Beat Reporting on the Environment
- Native American Journalists Association 2018 'Excellence in Journalism' Media Awards: Second Place Best Environmental Coverage
- Native American Journalists Association 2017 'Excellence in Journalism' Media Awards: First Place "Best Environmental Coverage" in a daily/weekly.
- Native American Journalists Association 2014 'Excellence in Journalism' Media Awards: 2nd Place "Best Environmental News Story" in a daily/weekly, "Wisconsin ignored findings of scientists to rewrite mining laws," Indian Country Today Media Network
- Native American Journalists Association 2013 'Excellence in Journalism' Media Awards: 2nd Place "Best Environmental News Story" in a daily/weekly, "Toxics in Every Glass," Indian Country Today Media Network
- Native American Journalists Association 2011 'Excellence in Journalism' Media Awards: "Best Environmental News Story" in a daily/weekly, Indian Country Today Media Network
- Native American Journalists Association 2011 'Excellence in Journalism' Media Awards: "Best Feature Story" in a monthly, High Country News
- Native American Journalists Association 2010 'Excellence in Journalism' Media Awards: "Best Environmental Story" in a daily/weekly, Indian Country Today Media Network
- Native American Journalists Association 2008 Media Awards: "Best News Story" in a monthly, High Country News
- Native American Journalists Association 2008 Media Awards: "Best Environmental News Story" in a daily/weekly Indian Country Today
- The Wordcraft Circle of Native Writers and Storytellers Writer of the Year, Prose 1996 and 1997
- Native American Journalists Association 1997 Media Awards: "Honorable Mention, Best News Story"
- The Oregonian Publisher’s Award of Excellence 1990
