= Red Bear =

Red Bear may refer to:

== People ==
- Avis Red Bear, Native American journalist

== Other ==
- A Red Bear (film), an Argentine, Spanish and French film
- Himalayan brown bear, also known as the Himalayan red bear
