= Capriccioso =

Capriccioso may refer to

- Rob Capriccioso
- Pezzo Capriccioso (Tchaikovsky)
- Introduction and Rondo Capriccioso by Camille Saint-Saëns

== See also ==
- Capriccio (music)
