= Navajo Times =

Navajo Tribal Council newspaper

- Type: Weekly newspaper
- Owner: Navajo Times Publishing Co. Inc.
- Publisher: Michael W. Kellogg
- Editor: Krista Allen
- Founded: 1959
- Language: English; Navajo (Rarely)
- Headquarters: Highway 264 & Route 12; PO Box 310; Window Rock, Arizona; Navajo Nation
- Circulation: 15,473 (as of 2022)
- ISSN: 0470-5106
- OCLC number: 16464595
- Website: navajotimes.com

The Navajo Times – known during the early 1980s as Navajo Times Today – is a newspaper created by the Navajo Tribal Council in 1959; in 1982 it was the first daily newspaper owned and published by a Native American Indian Nation. Now financially independent, it is published in English; its headquarters are located in Window Rock, Arizona.

Over the past half century, its editorial staff has continually faced challenges for editorial control from political leaders and opponents. In 1987 the tribal government shut down the publication and fired its entire staff. Under the leadership of former CEO/Publisher Tom Arviso Jr., the newspaper has worked to maintain and promote freedom of the press.

In 2004 the newspaper established financial independence from the tribal council. It is published by the Navajo Times Publishing Co. Inc. Its current CEO/Publisher Michael W. Kellogg. The newspaper is exploring the use of more Navajo language in its publications, including online. The current editor is Krista Allen.

== History ==
The first issue was published on August 4, 1960, and sold for 10 cents each, and the newspaper's slogan was "Voice of Scenic Navajoland." Unlike its predecessor Ádahooníłígíí of the 1940s, the Times is published in English, rarely and infrequently printing an insert or extra in Navajo.

Originally created as a monthly newsletter and mouthpiece of the tribal Council, the paper had become a weekly publication by the early 1960s. Unlike most other newspapers under the control of Native American governments, its editorial staff increasingly asserted its right to freedom of the press, guaranteed in the Navajo Nation's 4th Amendment to the Bill of Rights.

In the late 1970s, the paper had its first confrontations with then Chairman Peter MacDonald, who fired and re-hired its general manager several times related to the publication's editorials critical of the tribal government. In 1982, with its format changed to that of a daily newspaper and its circulation increasing from 4,000 to 8,000, editor Mark Trahant changed its name to Navajo Times Today. It was the first daily newspaper published by a Native American Nation in the United States. During the 1980s, its editorial staff enjoyed a period of journalistic freedom. Its reporters often criticized the Navajo government in their coverage.

=== Shutdown ===
After the 1987 election, the paper – still funded by the Navajo Nation government – was shut down by the chairman Peter MacDonald. The editorial board of the paper had endorsed MacDonald's opponent, Peterson Zah, during the campaign and continued to criticize the government in its editorials. The MacDonald administration laid off the entire staff. MacDonald claimed the shutdown was due to the paper's losing money and being financially unstable. When the government resumed publication of the newspaper four months later, the Navajo Times returned as a weekly.

=== Financial independence ===
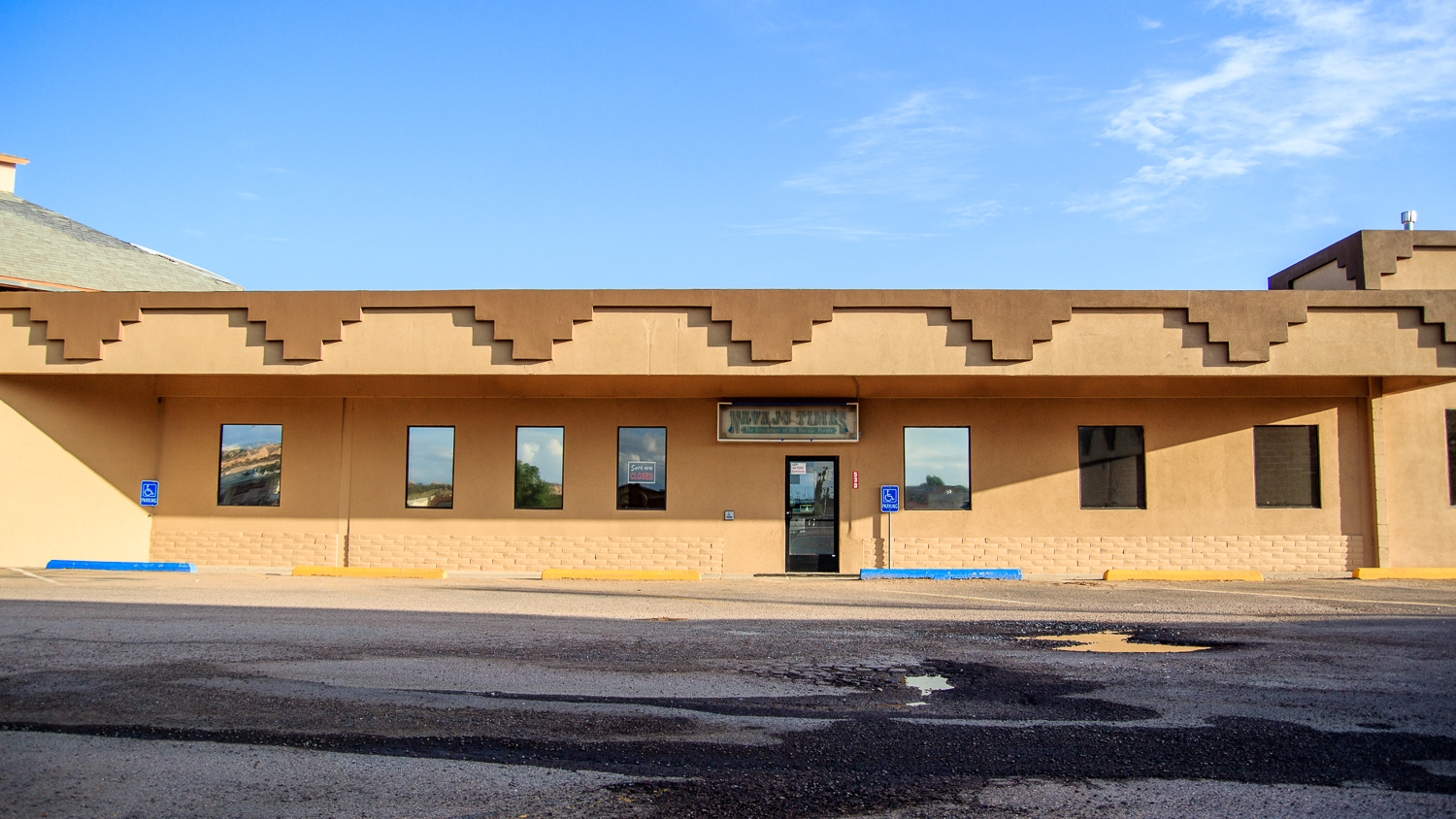
Navajo Times headquarters in Window Rock, Arizona

Under the leadership of Tom Arviso, Jr., who became editor in 1988, the paper in 2004 achieved financial independence of the tribal government. In 1993 Arviso became publisher and stepped down in May 2022. Thereafter Olivia Benally served as the CEO/Publisher. Arviso has been recognized for his contributions to journalism:

- 1997, he was awarded the Native American Journalists Association (NAJA)'s Wassaja Award for "extraordinary service to Native journalism."
- 1998, Freedom of Information Award by the Arizona Newspapers Association
- 2000-2001, the first and so far only full-blood Native American to win a John S. Knight Fellowship at Stanford University
- 2009, he received the John Peter and Anna Catherine Zenger Award, given jointly by The University of Arizona School of Journalism and the Arizona Newspapers Foundation, for his promotion of freedom of the press at the Navajo Times and other Native American newspapers.

== See also ==
List of Indigenous newspapers in North America
