= Mark Trahant =

American journalist

Mark Trahant is a journalist and the founding editor of Indian Country Today (now ICT), an Indigenous-focused news operation.

== Career ==
External videos
- Panel: "Stop Making Native People “Political Fodder”" on Democracy Now!, October 18, 2018

Trahant is a former Charles R. Johnson Professor of Journalism at the University of North Dakota. He is a citizen of Idaho's Shoshone-Bannock Tribes, and a former president of the Native American Journalists Association. Trahant is the former editor of the editorial page for the Seattle Post-Intelligencer, where he chaired the daily editorial board, directed a staff of writers, editors and a cartoonist. He was chairman and chief executive officer at the Maynard Institute for Journalism Education. He is a former columnist at The Seattle Times and has been publisher of the Moscow-Pullman Daily News in Moscow, Idaho; executive news editor of The Salt Lake Tribune; a reporter at the Arizona Republic in Phoenix; and has worked at several tribal newspapers. He was an editor in residence at the University of Idaho. Trahant was a reporter on the PBS series Frontline with a documentary called "The Silence," about sexual abuse by clergy in Alaska. At the 2004 UNITY conference in Washington, D.C., he asked George W. Bush what the meaning of tribal sovereignty was in the 21st century; Bush replied, "Tribal sovereignty means that. It’s sovereign. You’re a ... you’re a ... you’ve been given sovereignty and you’re viewed as a sovereign entity."

== Books ==
Trahant authored Pictures of Our Nobler Selves, a history of American Indian contributions to journalism published by Freedom Forum in 1996.

He contributed to a commissioned exhibit, The Whole Salmon, published by the Sun Valley Center for the Arts in 2003. He also contributed a chapter to Lewis and Clark Through Indian Eyes, an anthology edited by Alvin M. Josephy Jr. and published in 2006.

His book The Last Great Battle of the Indian Wars was published in 2010, dealing with the federal government's Indian termination policy and the rise of Native American self-determination in the mid-20th century.

== Honors and awards ==
Trahant, as a co-author of a series on federal Indian policy, was a finalist for the 1988 Pulitzer Prize for National Reporting. Trahant's awards and honors include Best Columnist from the Native American Journalists Association and the Society of Professional Journalists, a Ruhl Fellowship, and co-winner of the Heywood Broun Award. He was a 2009-2010 Kaiser Media Fellow. In 1995 Trahant was a visiting professional scholar at The Freedom Forum's First Amendment Center at Vanderbilt University. Trahant was a juror for the Pulitzer Prize in 2004 and 2005. Trahant received the 2025 I.F. Stone Medal for journalistic independence from the Nieman Foundation at Harvard.

== Personal life ==
Trahant lives in Phoenix, Arizona. He is married to Jaynie Parrish.
