= Hopi Clansmen =

The Hopi Clansmen, originally spelled as "Hopi Klansmen", was a rock and roll boy band created in 1965 by a group of four Hopi Indian students. who formerly attended the Phoenix Indian School. According to American Indian Historical Society, their records "sold like pine nuts to Hopi youths shopping at the Keams Canyon Trading Post"... "These lads, who were the Hopi answer to the Beatles, billed themselves as The Hopi Klansmen."

As of 2025, their self-titled LP can be listened to in full on YouTube. Their work has been re-released on vinyl record and cassette tape.

Band member Ivan Sidney later became a Hopi Tribes Chairman. The reunited band still performs today as Hopi Clansmen.
