= Bryn Nelson =

American science journalist

Bryn Nelson is an American science journalist. Based in Seattle, he originally trained as a microbiologist and was previously a staff writer at Newsday. Nelson is the author of the 2023 book Flush: The Remarkable Science of an Unlikely Treasure.

== Background ==
Originally from Ohio, Nelson lived in Minnesota, Seattle, Santa Cruz, and Brooklyn before relocating back to Seattle in 2008. He is a 1992 graduate of Concordia College and received a PhD in microbiology from the University of Washington in 1998 and a graduate certificate in science writing from the University of California, Santa Cruz in 1999.

== Career ==
Nelson was a science writer at Newsday from 2000 to 2007. In 2011, Nelson edited two chapters on microbiology and food safety for the six-volume Modernist Cuisine: The Art and Science of Cooking. In 2013, he contributed a chapter to The Science Writers' Handbook: Everything You Need to Know to Pitch, Publish, and Prosper in the Digital Age. Nelson's work has appeared in publications including The New York Times, The Guardian, MSNBC.com, Nature, and High Country News.

In 2022, Nelson published the book Flush: The Remarkable Science of an Unlikely Treasure, a popular book about the unappreciated ways in which human waste can serve as a resource. In a starred review, Kirkus Reviews called Flush "an authoritative, informative, and entertaining book that will change the thinking about what comes out of our bodies".

== Awards ==
In 2007, Nelson received received first place in the large newspapers and wire services category of the Association of Health Care Journalists' Awards for Excellence in Health Care Journalism and the feature reporting category of the Deadline Club's annual journalism awards for "Saving Bobby," a feature he wrote for Newsday.

In 2023, he received the Association of LGBTQ+ Journalists' Excellence in Opinion/Editorial Writing Award for "How Stochastic Terrorism Uses Disgust to Incite Violence," which he wrote for Scientific American.
