= Laurie Wirt =

American scientist working in the fields of hydrology and hydrogeology

- Born: Laurie Wirt
- Died: June 26, 2006 (aged 47–48); Colorado, U.S.
- Scientific career
- Fields: Hydrology; Aquatic Geochemistry
- Workplaces: U.S. Geological Survey

Laurie Wirt (1958–2006) was an American scientist working in the fields of hydrology and aquatic geochemistry. She was an activist for water conservation, and was particularly known for her advocacy in the Upper Verde River in Arizona, where she fought against groundwater pumping that threatened river flows. Her research at the U.S. Geological Survey laid out the impacts of pipeline development on aquifers and river flows, and was described as a "Bible for opponents of the pipeline plan ".

== Life ==
Laurie Wirt was born in 1958 and raised in Boylston, Massachusetts. From 1997, she lived in Boulder, Colorado, with her husband, Kirk Vincent. She died on June 26, 2006, in a kayaking accident on the Cache la Poudre River in Colorado. The American Whitewater Accident Database provides a record of the accident. Her death was reported by Southwest Hydrology magazine.

== Education ==
Wirt gained her bachelor's degree in geology from Amherst College and her master's degree in geosciences from the University of Arizona. Her senior research thesis was on the topic of how the Connecticut River was affected by artificial water flow patterns introduced by hydroelectric pump storage and release.

== Research and advocacy ==
Wirt worked as a hydrologist at the U.S. Geological Survey, in Tucson, Arizona, and Denver, Colorado.

Shw was best known for her activist approach, supported by her research findings, and her advocacy included regularly meeting with citizen groups. In particular, she campaigned to preserve the Upper Verde River in Arizona, where river flows were at risk from a planned pipeline project to pump water from the Big Chino basin to provide water to the city of Prescott, Arizona.

Wirt's research at USGS laid out the impacts of the pipeline on the Upper Verde River. Her 2005 report "Sources of Base Flow in the Upper Verde River", was described as the "Bible for opponents of the pipeline plan" by The Arizona Republic newspaper. The report used chemical analysis of the water in the springs feeding the river to conclude that up to 86 percent of the Upper Verde comes from the Big Chino. The report drew on Wirt's previous report, co-authored with retired USGS hydrologist Win Hjalmarson, that established the figure as approximately 80 percent.

Wirt's work and conclusions that drawing down the aquifer would devastate the river were disputed and opposed by developers. A detailed account of her part in the campaign is given in the High Country News article "The Battle for the Verde".
