= David Gonzalez (journalist) =

Nuyorican journalist

- Born: New York City, U.S.
- Education: Yale University (BS); Columbia University (MS)
- Occupation: Journalist
- Writing career
- Notable awards: Mike Berger Prize, Columbia University (1992); Distinguished Writing Award, American Society of Newspaper Editors (2008); Hall of Fame, National Association of Hispanic Journalists (2013)
- Website: seisdelsur.net

David Gonzalez is a journalist at The New York Times. Among other posts, he has been the Times Bronx Bureau Chief, the "About New York" Columnist, and the Central America and Caribbean Bureau Chief. His coverage has ranged from the Oklahoma city bombing and Haiti’s humanitarian crises, to chronicling how the Bronx emerged from years of official neglect, to in-depth reports on how Latino immigration is shaping the United States.

In addition to his print reporting, Gonzalez is a photographer and the co-editor of the Times Lens Blog, which has become the premier internet site for photojournalists from around the world.

== Early life and education ==
Gonzalez was born in the South Bronx of New York City. His parents Pedro and Lillian Gonzalez came to New York from Puerto Rico as teenagers, and Gonzalez received a Catholic School education: first at Saint Athanasius and Saint Martin of Tours grammar schools, then at Cardinal Hayes High School, where he was on the track team for four years. He also published his first article in the school’s student newspaper,The Challenger.

At Cardinal Hayes, an English teacher named Bill Kerrigan and Father Jeremiah Monahan were strong and early influences in Gonzalez's development as a writer. Over the years, Gonzalez maintained a lifelong friendship with Father Monahan, until his passing in 1999.

Gonzalez graduated from Yale in 1979 with a bachelor’s degree in psychology, and obtained a master’s degree in journalism from the Columbia University School of Journalism in 1983.

== Journalism career ==
Immediately after graduating from Columbia, Gonzalez joined the staff of Newsweek magazine, where he filed stories from New York, Detroit and Miami.

In 1990, he joined The New York Times as a reporter for their Metro Desk, where he became known for stories focusing on the neighborhoods of New York City, while reflecting on larger social and cultural issues in American society.

From 1995 to 1999, Gonzalez wrote the Times "About New York" column, identifying and illuminating citywide issues through intimate snapshots of the lives of ordinary New Yorkers, in "prose that was often powerfully affecting." In one memorable column, he portrayed a woman's visit to a garment center sweatshop. As a single mother "she was both father and mother…nor did she have any child care, so she took him to the factory, where he played with the fabric scraps piled up on the floor, bundling them together in make-believe igloos."

From 1999 to 2003, Gonzalez moved to the Times foreign desk to serve as their Caribbean and Central American Bureau Chief, based in Miami. His area of coverage spanned from Belize to Panama and included all the islands of the Caribbean – a region of some three dozen countries. Gonzalez often accompanied his stories with his own photographs, as well.

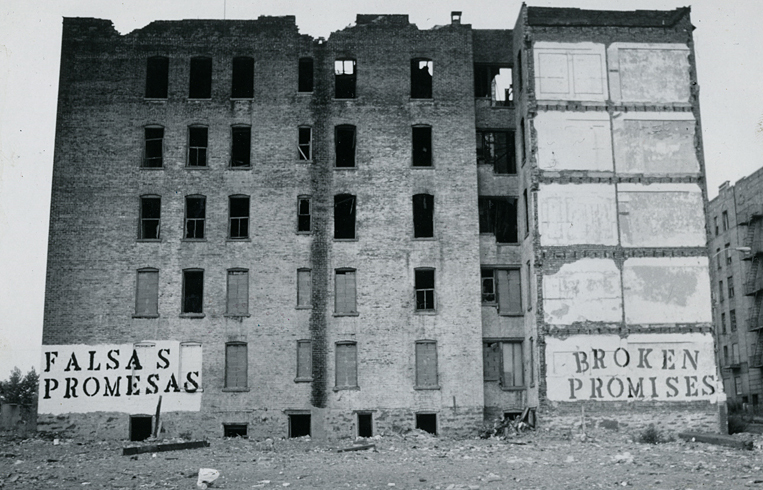
The BROKEN PROMISES building, as reported by David Gonzalez in "Faces in the Rubble."

As the Times citywide columnist from 2004 until 2008, Gonzalez analyzed social and cultural themes. His debut column, a profile of the Nuyorican poet Pedro Pietri, proved to be the artist's last major interview before his 2004 death. Another column highlighted the collateral damage caused by predatory lenders in minority neighborhoods, before the nation's subprime collapse.

Until 2011, Gonzalez wrote numerous lengthy narrative pieces on such topics as the children of undocumented immigrants and the role of the arts in community life. He also produced several major projects with significant multimedia components for the Times. This included "House Afire," a three-part series about a struggling Pentecostal storefront church in West Harlem; "A Family Divided by 2 Words, Legal and Illegal, about a family of mixed-immigration status; and "Faces in the Rubble," a personal essay and slide show about Gonzalez's devastated South Bronx neighborhood during the late 70s and early 80s.

"Faces in the Rubble" added a visual dimension to Gonzalez's reporting. For example, along Charlotte Street – which U.S. presidents Jimmy Carter, Ronald Reagan and Bill Clinton had used for political photo ops – Gonzalez noted that "an artist wrote BROKEN PROMISES on the same buildings that served as stage sets for politicians to troll for votes."

From 2011 onward, Gonzalez has been the Times Side Street columnist and the co-editor of the Times Lens Blog. At "Side Street" he writes and shoots a bi-weekly photo and essay that explores people and places in out-of-the-way corners of New York City. For "Lens Blog" he writes, assigns and edits daily features and slide shows for an online showcase of visual journalism with 850,000 monthly visitors. According to the National Press Photographers Association, within five years, "Lens Blog has become the 'go to’ site for photojournalists as well as anyone interested in photography.

== Photojournalism ==
External videos
- David Gonzalez shares photojournalism advice at De La Salle Academy.

Gonzalez has been active photographer since 1979.

In that year, he became the project coordinator for En Foco, a Latino photographic collective that was an early and vigorous advocate for minority artists. En Foco provided him 24-hour access to a darkroom. In addition to teaching photography to public schoolchildren, Gonzalez took photos of street fairs, block parties, abandoned and burned buildings, and had exhibitions in libraries, bank lobbies, and many other forums.

As Central America/Caribbean Bureau Chief for the Times, Gonzalez shot many of the photos which accompanied his stories. His photos from the 2001 El Salvador earthquake, by themselves, occupied nearly an entire page in the Sunday edition of the Times.

His photo essay "Faces in the Rubble" sparked tremendous reader interest when it was the cover of the Times Sunday Metropolitan section in August, 2009.

== Seis del Sur ==
External videos
- David Gonzalez speaks at the opening of Seis del Sur.

In 2009, Gonzalez and five fellow photographers – Angel Franco, Joe Conzo Jr., Ricky Flores, Francisco Molina Reyes II, and Edwin Pagán – formed a collective known as Seis del Sur (Six from the South), with the shared goal of documenting the life of the South Bronx which they had all witnessed, particularly from the 1970s through the early 1990s.

In January 2013, Seis del Sur had its first exhibition at the Bronx Documentary Center. The January 19 opening was an overwhelming success with a crowd that included musician Afrika Bombaataa, actress Annabelle Sciorra, the artists of Tats Cru, and former Bronx Borough President Fernando Ferrer. The group's goal was to show – as insiders – the complexity of life in the South Bronx, especially during the years it was hit hard by arson and abandonment. Speaking to the opening night crowd, Gonzalez said, "This is our family album. These are our family pictures. It’s just that we’ve got a complicated family." The following six weeks featured standing-room-only screenings, and panel discussions every weekend.

== Peer recognition ==
External videos
- David Gonzalez speaks at the Columbia School of Journalism.

In a career at the Times which spans three decades, Gonzalez has become recognized for the range and depth of his work – including reports on terrorism in Latin America, the aftermath of civil war in El Salvador, deficiencies in the U.S. census, the health crisis amongst Nicaraguan sugar cane workers, arson and devastation in the South Bronx, and the photography of Jack Delano and Walker Evans.

In 1992, Gonzalez received Columbia University's Mike Berger Award for his coverage of New York City and its neighborhoods.

In 1997, he was named as one of the "Nations 100 Most Influential Hispanics" by Hispanic Business magazine.

In 2000, he received the Feature Writing Award from the National Association of Hispanic Journalists for "Game Produces 28 Hits and a Political Home Run," about a baseball game between the Cuban and Venezuelan national teams.

In 2008, he received the Distinguished Writing Award from the American Society of Newspaper Editors for "House Afire," his three-part series on the life of a struggling Pentecostal storefront church.

In 2013, he was inducted into the National Association of Hispanic Journalists Hall of Fame.

Gonzalez was named a Media Trailblazer by the Center for Puerto Rican Studies at Hunter College.

His feature writing has been honored twice by Columbia University's Workshops on Race and Ethnicity, and by the Associated Press.

Gonzalez also received the New York Associated Press award for feature writing.

== Awards and honors ==
The following awards received by David Gonzalez were reported by the National Association of Hispanic Journalists.

- Mike Berger Award, Columbia University, 1992.
- Nation's 100 Most Influential Hispanics, Hispanic Business Magazine, 1997.
- Hostos Community College Commencement Speaker, 1998
- New York's 25 Most Influential Latinos, Viva Magazine (NY Daily News), 1998.
- Citation of Merit, Bronx Borough President Fernando Ferrer, 1999.
- Hombres Distinguidos Award, El Diario/La Prensa, 2005
- Cardinal Hayes High School Hall of Fame, 2011.

== See also ==
- Puerto Rican literature
- List of Puerto Rican writers
