= Rob Capriccioso =

Native American journalist

- Citizenship: Sault Ste. Marie Tribe of Chippewa Indians, American
- Education: University of Michigan
- Occupations: journalist, writer
- Employer: Indian Country Today
- Organization: Indigenous Wire

Rob Capriccioso is a journalist and writer who founded the Indigenous Wire publication on the Substack platform. He is the first Indigenous journalist to receive a Substack Pro deal. Indigenous Wire covers policy, politics, media, economics and sovereignty issues.

== Background ==
Rob Capriccioso is an enrolled citizen of the Sault Ste. Marie Tribe of Chippewa Indians in Sault Ste. Marie, Michigan. He is a political science and psychology alum of the University of Michigan. He resides in metro Washington, D.C.

== Journalism career ==
Capriccioso was the longtime Washington Bureau Chief for Indian Country Today and wrote special features for the publication during the COVID-19 pandemic; before that he worked as a general assignment reporter for ICT starting in 2008. He was later a senior editor based in the Washington, D.C. metro area for Tribal Business News. He was a contributing writer to American Indian Report and News from Indian Country.

Capriccioso covers the White House, the Executive Branch, the United States Congress, the Supreme Court of the United States, and presidential campaigns, 2004 through 2024. He is the first Native American journalist to Q&A a sitting president, President Barack Obama, in an Oct. 4, 2012 news story titled, "President Obama Answers Questions From Indian Country Today Media Network in Unprecedented Exchange.". Previously, he received answers from President George W. Bush for a journalistic website presentation of the former Connect for Kids publication.

He has interviewed such notables as U.S. President Barack Obama, Transportation Secretary Pete Buttigieg, White House Chief of Staff Pete Rouse, Bolivian President Evo Morales (Aymara), Senate Majority Leader Harry Reid, Homeland Security Chief Michael Chertoff, members of Congress and tribal leaders. His reporting on Indigenous issues was cited in testimony to Congress. His reporting on the Treasury Department's inequitable distributions of pandemic relief funds to tribes was cited in a September 2021 letter from several U.S. senators to the Biden administration. He was a featured speaker at the 2022 SXSW conference, regarding his work as a journalist during the so-called "creator economy."

One of a small number of Native American journalists to contribute to mainstream media, as documented by the Native American Journalists Association, he has served as a contributing editor to Campaigns and Elections, helped launch Politico as its founding website editor, and has appeared on National Public Radio to discuss Native and political topics of the day.

== Awards and honors ==
Capriccioso has won numerous awards throughout his career, including a general excellence Native American Journalists Association (NAJA) beat award for his coverage of tribal-federal policy in 2015. He won the 2013 NAJA award for Best News Story and the first and second place awards for the NAJA Best News Story and third place for Best Feature Story in 2014. In 2011, he received two more first place NAJA awards, in the news and feature categories. He was awarded in 2006 by the Association for University and College Counseling Center Directors for his reporting on the counseling crisis facing students at various institutions of higher education. He earned his first NAJA first place award in 2004 and was elected to serve on the NAJA Board in 2015-16.

== See also ==
- Native American writers
