= Tristan Ahtone =

Kiowa journalist

- Ahtone in 2022
- Born: Phoenix, Arizona
- Citizenship: Kiowa Tribe and U.S.
- Education: Institute of American Indian Arts, Columbia School of Journalism, Harvard University (Note: As a Nieman Fellow.)
- Occupation: Journalist
- Employer: Grist Magazine Inc.
- Known for: investigative journalism
- Website: tristanahtone.net

Tristan Ahtone is a Native American journalist and citizen of the Kiowa Tribe. He is currently the editor-at-large at Grist Magazine.

== Early life and education ==
Tristan Ahtone was born in Phoenix, Arizona. He attended the Institute of American Indian Arts in Santa Fe and the Columbia School of Journalism in New York. Later, he attended Harvard University as a Nieman Fellow.

== Journalism career ==
Tristan Ahtone has written for several outlets, including Al Jazeera America, The Newshour with Jim Lehrer, National Geographic, NPR, National Native News, Frontline, Wyoming Public Radio, Vice, and more.

His investigation with lecturer Robert Lee on land-grant universities was awarded a Polk Award in 2020.

He was previously the editor-in-chief of the Texas Observer and the Indigenous Affairs editor at High Country News. In 2017, he created the tribal affairs desk for High Country News.

== Community service ==
Ahtone was formerly the president of the Native American Journalists Association (now Indigenous Journalists Association).

== Awards and honors ==
In 2017, the Nieman Foundation for Journalism named Ahtone a Neiman Fellow.

== See also ==
- List of Indigenous writers of the Americas
