= John Gabbert =

California Court of Appeal justice

John G. Gabbert
- Born: June 20, 1909; Oxnard, California, US
- Died: December 9, 2013 (aged 104); Riverside, California, US
- Occupation: Associate Justice of the California Court of Appeals
- Known for: Advocacy to found University of California, Riverside

John Gordon Gabbert (June 20, 1909 – December 9, 2013) was an American judge. He was associate justice of the California Courts of Appeal appointed by Governor Ronald Reagan in May 1970. Before that, he was a Superior Court judge for Riverside County, California.

== Biography ==
=== Early life ===
Gabbert was born in Oxnard, California on June 20, 1909. In 1912, when he was three years old, he moved with his parents to Riverside, California. His father, J. R. Gabbert, purchased the Riverside Enterprise newspaper and worked as both editor and publisher. Gabbert grew up working with the metal type in his father's print shop at the press.

=== Education ===
Gabbert attended public grade schools and Poly High School in Riverside. After graduating from South Pasadena High School in 1927, he attended Riverside Junior College, where he was the Student Body President in 1929, and then Occidental College where he earned a Bachelor of Arts degree in 1931. He then attended Duke University School of Law from 1931 to 1932, but transferred to Boalt School of Law at the University of California, Berkeley in 1933. He completed his LL.B. at Boalt in 1934.

It was during his time at Riverside Junior College that Gabbert met fellow student Rupert Costo, a Native American activist, who became a lifelong friend and fellow advocate for the establishment of a campus of the University of California in Riverside.

During World War II, he enlisted in the United States Army and in 1944 served with the Criminal Investigation Division in New Guinea and the Philippines.

=== Legal career ===
Following his graduation from Boalt Law School, Gabbert was admitted to the California Bar on October 16, 1934 and to the Philippine Islands Bar in 1945.

Gabbert served as Deputy District Attorney for Riverside County from 1935 to 1938. He next went into private practice with the father and son legal team of Best & Best in Riverside, thus forming the new firm of Best, Best & Gabbert in 1938, where he practiced law until 1943 and then from 1945 to 1949. He also served as a City Court Judge for Riverside County from 1941 to 1943. In 1949, he was appointed by Governor Earl Warren as a Judge in the Superior Court of Riverside County, a position he held from 1949 to 1970. (It was at this time that his name was removed from the law firm that eventually became known as Best, Best, & Krieger.) In May 1970, Governor Ronald Reagan appointed him as a Presiding Justice of the California Appellate Court, Fourth Appellate District, Division Two, a position which he held until his retirement on June 1, 1974.

=== Civic involvement ===
Gabbert served as a school board member for the Riverside Unified School District from 1946 to 1949. He is a former president of the Riverside County Bar Association as well as the Lions Club, the Present Day Club, and the Citizens University Committee. He also served on a variety of civic and charitable organizations both in a membership as well as a leadership capacity and was a member of the Executive Committee of University of La Verne College of Law.

=== University of California, Riverside advocacy ===
In his role as President of the Citizens University Committee, Gabbert worked with Rupert Costo and other civic leaders to lobby the University of California system to establish a campus in Riverside.

=== Marriage and children ===
Gabbert married Katherine Jeanette Fuller in Tulare, California on June 11, 1938. The couple had three children:

- Sarah Gabbert (June 29, 1940 – present)
- Katherine Gabbert (December 24, 1942 – present)
- Scott Gabbert (January 28, 1946 – present)

== Political views ==
Gabbert was registered as a Republican.

== Bibliography ==
=== Books ===
- Boyce, A.M. (1987) Odyssey of an entomologist: adventures on the farm, at sea, and in the university / by Alfred M. Boyce; based on taped conversations with John G. Gabbert; edited by Elizabeth Lang and Robert Lang. Riverside, CA: UC Riverside Foundation. OCLC 15644827
- Fitch, Robert J. and John G. Gabbert. (1998) Roman Warren: cowboy aviator. Riverside, CA: Riverside County Historical Commission Press. OCLC 38827241

=== Audiovisual materials ===
- Gabbert, John G. (2008) Riverside, my Riverside John G. Gabbert remembers, 1915–1925. Riverside, CA: LIFE Society, UC Riverside Extension. DVD OCLC 261341170
- Gabbert, John G. (2009) When all the world was young: John G. Gabbert in his 20s. Riverside, CA: LIFE Society, UC Riverside Extension. DVD OCLC 462946898
