= Tim Giago =

American journalist (1934–2022)

- Born: Timothy Anotine Giago Jr. July 12, 1934; Kyle, South Dakota, U.S.
- Died: July 24, 2022 (aged 88); Rapid City, South Dakota, U.S.
- Other name: Nanwica Kciji
- Education: San Jose Junior College; University of Nevada, Reno
- Occupations: Journalist; publisher
- Spouses: Doris (divorced): Jackie
- Children: 12

Timothy Antoine Giago Jr. (July 12, 1934 – July 24, 2022), also known as Nanwica Kciji, was an American Oglala Lakota journalist and publisher. In 1981, he founded the Lakota Times with Doris Giago at the Pine Ridge Indian Reservation, where he was born and grew up. It was the first independently owned Native American newspaper in the United States. In 1991 Giago was selected as a Nieman Fellow at Harvard University. In 1992 he changed his paper's name to Indian Country Today, to reflect its national coverage of Indian news and issues.

Giago sold the paper in 1998. Two years later he founded The Lakota Journal, which he sold in 2004 while thinking of retirement. In 2009, he returned to papers and founded the Native Sun News, based in Rapid City, South Dakota. He was also a columnist for the Huffington Post. He founded the Native American Journalists Association (NAJA) and served as its first president. When hired in 1979 to write a column for the Rapid City Journal, Giago was the first Native American writer for a South Dakota newspaper.

== Early life and education ==
Giago, whose Lakota name was Nanwica Kciji, was born on July 12, 1934, and grew up at the Oglala Lakota Pine Ridge Indian Reservation in South Dakota. According to Giago, he got his Spanish surname from his paternal grandfather Jesus Gallego, a Pueblo man who came to work as a vaquero in the Dakota Territory in the late 1880s; this name ended up being spelled phonetically on the rolls of the Oglala Sioux Tribe as "Giago." He attended the Holy Rosary Indian Mission school. He later wrote poetry and articles about the anger he felt at having his Lakota identity and culture suppressed. He attended San Jose Junior College in California and the University of Nevada, Reno.

== Career ==
Giago served with the U.S. Navy at the San Francisco Naval Shipyard, where he started writing because his commander noticed "he typed well" and assigned him to produce the base newspaper. Giago also wrote personal articles and poems about his mission school experience, first published in the monthly journal Wassaja, run by Jeannette and Rupert Costo of San Francisco during the 1970s.

Jim Carrier, then an editor of the Rapid City Journal, saw his work and offered Giago a column for $10 a week. In 1979, his "Notes from Indian Country" became the first American Indian voice in a South Dakota newspaper. Giago's hiring had followed Wounded Knee incident in 1973 at the Pine Ridge Indian Reservation, which received international attention, and near civil war on the reservation during the next few years, but, as Carrier wrote later, "none of the state's 11 daily newspapers or 145 weeklies covered the mayhem in any depth, relying instead on the Associated Press or printing nothing at all." A year later the paper offered Giago a full-time position and he began to learn the newspaper business. As a young reporter, he was sometimes told that he could not cover events at the Pine Ridge Reservation because he could not be "objective", an opinion which he questioned.

In 1981, Giago moved back to the reservation to begin the Lakota Times with Doris Giago (his wife at the time) as a weekly community newspaper to represent his neighbors' lives. It was the first independently owned Native American newspaper; most papers published on reservations have been owned by tribal governments. In the beginning, he earned revenue by publishing the most complete list of pow-wows nationally and selling related advertising. This gave him needed independence on the reservation. He wrote editorials criticizing US and state policy related to Native Americans, and his columns were soon syndicated by Knight-Ridder. After his criticism of AIM's violence on the reservation, his offices were fire-bombed. Despite his criticism of programs, he gradually earned the respect of tribal governments, and gained their support for his independence during difficult years.

Through the years, Giago hired and trained numerous Native Americans, some of whom later moved on to other papers and media to become successful in journalism. He also founded the Native American Journalists Association (NAJA) and served as its first president. To encourage American Indian participation in the media, the NAJA Foundation provides scholarships and summer internships to journalism students who are Indian. The foundation also holds three major seminars a year for working Indian journalists, publishers and the business side.

Gradually Giago expanded his paper's coverage to all the Indian reservations in South Dakota, then to American Indian issues nationwide. To reflect its national coverage, in 1992 he changed the name of the paper to Indian Country Today. In 1998, Giago sold the paper to the Oneida Nation, based in New York. At the time it was grossing $1.9 million annually in ad sales. By 2005, it was the largest Native American paper, reaching 50 states and 17 countries.

In 2000, Giago founded The Lakota Times and sold it in 2004 to the Flandreau Santee Sioux Tribe, thinking he would retire. After the Times stopped publishing, Giago founded the Native Sun News in 2009 in Rapid City, South Dakota, committing to his style of investigative journalism as well as broad coverage of Indian news. It is published on paper only. He also was a columnist for the Huffington Post, an online news source.

== Personal life ==
Giago and his first wife, Doris, with whom he started the Lakota Times, later divorced. She became the first Indian journalism professor at South Dakota State University (SDSU) and also the first tenured Native American Professor in SDSU history. She retired as professor emeritus in 2014. His second wife was named Jackie. He had twelve children.

Giago died from complications of cancer and diabetes in Rapid City, South Dakota, on July 24, 2022, aged 88.

== Books ==
- The Aboriginal Sin: Reflections on the Holy Rosary Indian Mission School (Red Cloud Indian School), poetry, San Francisco: Indian Historian Press, 1978. OCLC 4710052
- Notes from Indian Country, K. Cochran, 1984. Non-fiction.
- The American Indian and the Media, Minneapolis, MN: National Conference of Christians and Jews, 1991. ISBN 0-9631926-0-4
- Children Left Behind: The Dark Legacy of Indian Mission Boarding Schools, Santa Fe, NM: Clear Light Publishing, 2002. ISBN 9781574160864

== Honors ==
- The Lakota Times/Indian Country Today won more than 50 awards from the South Dakota Newspaper Association while Giago was publisher;
- 1985, H. L. Mencken Award for journalism;
- 1991, Harvard University Nieman Fellowship;
- University of Missouri Distinguished Journalism Award;
- 2007, the first American Indian inducted into the South Dakota Newspaper Hall of Fame
