= National Association of Hispanic Journalists =

Washington, D.C.-based organization

The National Association of Hispanic Journalists (NAHJ) is a Washington, D.C.–based organization dedicated to the advancement of Hispanic and Latino journalists in the United States and Puerto Rico. It was established in 1984.

NAHJ has approximately 4,300 members, including working journalists, journalism students, other media-related professionals and journalism educators.

The first president of NAHJ was Gerald Garcia, Jr., who was also one of the founders of the organization. After Garcia, Guillermo Martinez served from 1985-86. Manuel Galvan was the first president to serve a two year term from 1986 to 1988. Evelyn Hernandez became the first woman president of NAHJ and youngest elected at 28 years old from 1988 to 1990.

Don Flores served from 1990 to 1992, Diane Alverio from 1992 to 1994, Gilbert Bailon from 1994 to 1996, Dino Chiecchi from 1996 to 1998, Nancy Baca from 1998-2000, Cecilia Alvear from 2000 to 2002, Juan Gonzalez from 2002 to 2004, Veronica Villafane from 2004 to 2006, Rafael Olmeda from 2006 to 2008, Ricardo Pimentel from 2008 to 2010 and Michele Salcedo from 2010 to 2012.

In 2012, Hugo Balta was elected to the first of two terms he served as President, the first and only president to serve twice. In 2014, Mekahlo Medina, the first LGBTQ+ president was elected.

Brandon Benavides served from 2016 to 2018, Hugo Balta second term from 2018 to 2020, Nora Lopez in 2020 to 2022 and current president Yvette Cabrera from 2022 to 2024.

Under the leadership of Juan González in 2002 to 2004, NAHJ created the Parity Project to assist news organizations in hiring and retaining Hispanic journalists and improving coverage of the Hispanic communities across the U.S. NAHJ is one of the few journalist associations to take a stand against media consolidation, largely due to the influence of Gonzalez and former presidents Verónica Villafañe (2004–2006) and Rafael Olmeda (2006–2008). NAHJ is a former partner organization of Unity Journalists of Color, Inc.

NAHJ is the publisher of the online magazine palabra.

== Hall of Fame ==
In annual awards since 2000, the NAHJ recognizes great achievements.

For 2013, David Gonzales and Gilbert Bailon were honored. Previous honorees (with short notes in "quotes" being NAHJ website wordings) are:

2023:

- Lori Montenegro, Washington, D.C. Bureau Chief, Noticias Telemundo
- Alfredo Corchado, Mexico Bureau Chief, Dallas Morning News
- Angela Korchega, news director, KTEP and Borderzine; multimedia editor, ElPasoMatters.org
- Enrique Flor, journalist, El Nuevo Herald

2022:

- Diana R. Fuentes, Executive Director, IRE (Investigative Reporters & Editors)
- Robert Hernandez, Professor of Professional Practice, USC Annenberg School for Communication & Journalism
- Steve Gonzales, (posthumous), photojournalist, Houston Chronicle
- Rebecca Aguilar, freelance reporter

2021:

- Jesús Colon, (posthumous) journalist, Columnist, Daily Worker, poet, father of the Nuyorican Movement
- Jovita Idár, (posthumous) activist, journalist, La Crónica

2020: Hall of Fame Awards were not given in 2020 due to the coronavirus pandemic

2019:

- Jim Avila, journalist, former White House Correspondent
- Elaine Ayala, Columnist, San Antonio-Express News
- Ana Real, (posthumous) Foreign News Editor, CBS News

2018:

- Rosental Alves, Professor, and Knight Chair in Journalism and UNESCO Chair in Communication, University of Texas, Austin; Director, Knight Center for Journalism in the Americas
- Alberto Ibargüen, President & CEO, John S. and James L. Knight Foundation
- Aminda Marqués Gonzalez, Executive Editor and Senior Vice President, Miami Herald and el Nuevo Herald
- Mc Nelly Torres, Independent Investigative Journalist

2017:

- Eraldo “Dino” Chiecchi, Associate Professor, University of Texas at El PasoFederico Subervi, Professor, Kent State University School of Journalism & Mass Communication (retired)
- Andrés Cediel, Lecturer, UC Berkeley Graduate School of JournalismJodi Hernandez, Reporter, NBC Bay Area News
- Nancy Rivera Brooks, Assistant Business Editor, Los Angeles Times
- Jodi Hernandez, Reporter, NBC Bay Area News

2016:

- Zita Arocha, Associate Professor, University of Texas at El Paso and Director, Borderzine.com
- Hugo Balta, Senior Director, Multi-Cultural Content, ESPN
- Robert Montemayor, Director, Rutgers University Latino Information Network
- Veronica Villafane, Editor and Publisher, MediaMoves.com

2015:

- Maria Martin, Director, GraciasVida Center for Media
- Miguel Pérez, Professor, Journalism, Lehman College, CUNY, Columnist, Creator’s Syndicate
- Frances Robles, Correspondent, New York Times

2014:

- NAHJ Founding Members
- Robert Alaníz, Manager, Community Affairs, KCBS-TV, and President, California Association for Latinos in Broadcasting
- Charlie Ericksen, Co-founder, Hispanic Link News Service
- Jesus Dávila, Reporter, El Diario/La Prensa
- Juan Manuel García Passalaqua, Attorney, educational foundation, Puerto Rico
- Gustavo Godoy, Vice President/News Director, Spanish International Network, (later became Univisión)
- Frank Gómez, Deputy Assistant Secretary of State for Public Affairs, U.S. Dept. of State
- Juan González, Reporter, Philadelphia Daily News
- Paula Maes, Public Affairs Director, KOB-TV, Albuquerque, NM
- Guillermo Martínez, Columnist, Editorial Board Member, The Miami Herald
- Henry Mendoza, News Director, KBAK-TV, Bakersfield, CA
- Maggie Rivas Rodríguez, Reporter, The Boston Globe
- Jay Rodríguez, Vice President, Corporate Communications, NBC
- María Elena Salinas, Reporter, Anchor and Public Affairs Host, KMEX-TV
- Edith Sayre Auslander, Assistant Professor, Journalism, University of Arizona
- Norma Sosa, Reporter/Editor, Chicago Sun-Times

2013:

- David Gonzalez (journalist)|David Gonzales
- Gilbert Bailon

2012:

- CCNMA: California Chicano News Media Association|California Chicano News Media Association, first organization to achieve the award.

2011:

- Ernest Sotomayor: "Assistant Dean for Career Services at Columbia University Graduate School of Journalism"

2010:

- Ray Suarez: "Senior Correspondent, PBS NewsHour"
- Gloria Campos: "Anchor, WFAA-Dallas"

2009:

- Geraldo Rivera: "Host, Fox’s newsmagazine “Geraldo-at-Large”
- Ysabel Durón: "Anchor, KRON-TV (San Francisco) “Weekend Morning News”
- Juan Gonzalez: "Founder and Editor, El Tecolote (newspaper)|El Tecolote; professor of journalism, City College of San Francisco"

2008:

- Juan Gonzalez: "Columnist, New York Daily News; former president, NAHJ"
- Maggie Rivas-Rodriguez: "Professor, University of Texas at Austin, media activist"
- Francisco P. Ramirez: "Founder, El Clamor Publico (Los Angeles)"

2007

- Cecilia Alvear: "retired producer, NBC, former president, NAHJ"
- Rigo Chacón: "three-time Emmy winner; president, Rigo Chacón and Associates (RCA)"
- George Ramos: "a three-time Pulitzer Prize-winning reporter, The Los Angeles Times; professor, California Polytechnic State University Journalism Department (San Luis Obispo, CA)"

2006:

- Maria Elena Salinas: "veteran anchor, “Noticiero Univision”; founding member, NAHJ"
- Henry Alfaro: "one of the first Mexican-American TV reporters, worked for 35 years at KABC-TV (Los Angeles)"

2005:

- Gerald Garcia, Jr.: "former publisher, Tucson Citizen (Arizona); founding member and first president of NAHJ"

2004

- Ignacio E. Lozano, Sr.: "founder, La Opinion"

2003:

- Dr. Mary Adelaide Gardner: "former professor of journalism, Michigan State University; journalism Scholar"
- Albor Ruiz: columnist, New York Daily News"

2002:

- Paul Espinosa: "independent producer, writer and director"
- Felix Gutiérrez: "author, educator and activist"
- Frank del Olmo: "former associate editor, the Los Angeles Times"
- Frank O. Sotomayor: "assistant METPRO director and hiring editor, Los Angeles Times"

2001:

- Charlie Ericksen: "founder, Hispanic Link News Service; founding member of NAHJ"
- Edith Sayre Auslander: "former reporter and editor, Arizona Daily Star; former professor, University of Arizona"
- Peter Moraga: "a pioneer in radio journalism in California and Arizona"

2000:

- Rubén Salazar: "columnist, the Los Angeles Times; news director, KMEX-DT"
- Elma Barrera: "reporter, ABC Channel 13 – first Hispanic female reporter in the Houston market in 1972"
- Sylvan Rodriguez: "former anchor, KHOU-TV 11 (Houston)"

== Student chapters ==
- Arizona State
- Brooklyn College
- California State University, Long Beach
- Columbia College Chicago
- Columbia University
- Craig Newmark Graduate School of Journalism
- Florida International University
- Lehman College
- Northwestern University
- Stony Brook University
- Syracuse University
- Texas State University
- University of Arizona
- University of California, Los Angeles
- University of Houston
- University of Illinois at Urbana–Champaign
- University of Missouri
- University of Oklahoma
- Universidad de Puerto Rico
- University of Southern California
- University of Texas at Austin
- University of Texas at Arlington
- University of Texas at El Paso
- University of Texas–Pan American
- University of Minnesota - Twin Cities
- University of North Texas
