= Larry Spotted Crow Mann =

Author and Musician

- Writing career
- Subject: The history of his tribe
- Notable work: Tales from the Whispering Basket

Larry Spotted Crow Mann is an author and musician belonging to the Nipmuc tribe.

== Writing ==
Larry Spotted Crow Mann's writing career began in his youth when he wrote letters to the government to draw attention to issues the Nipmuc people faced. He has been writing prose and poetry since his teens. He says, “I’m somebody who is dedicated to my culture and tradition, and through that I hope to bring forth the intrinsic connection we all have as human beings. I love to learn new things and from other cultures.” He intends his writing and music to honor traditions and teach uninformed audiences about Nipmuc people and history.

Spotted Crow Mann published his first book, a collection of short stories and poetry entitled Tales from the Whispering Basket, in 2013. In that book, he says, he wanted to acknowledge Nipmuc contributions to the foundations of America and to explore his ability to write in different genres. The stories cover themes of cultural loss, racial differences, and loneliness.

Spotted Crow Mann has also contributed news and opinion pieces to Indian Country Today Media Network.

== Music ==
As a musician, Spotted Crow Mann is a member of the Quabbin Lake Singers, a group that seeks to honor tribal culture, along with his three sons Anoki, Nantai, and Manixit. Spotted Crow Mann holds the role of Drum Keeper in the group, which requires him to “ensure the Drum is being honored and played in a manner for the particular ceremony taking place.” The Drum is a sacred object in his culture, respected as “the heart beat of Mother Earth” and “allows [them] to pray and communicate with the natural elements of the world and beyond.”

== Other projects ==
Larry Spotted Crow Mann has appeared in two documentaries about Native Americans: Living In Two Worlds and First Patriots. He was also cast in Chris Eyre's PBS documentary series We Shall Remain.

He has also participated in environmental activism, such as working with the United States Fish and Wildlife Service in order to protect an indigenous fish local to the Worcester area. He has stated that "[the] Earth is not something for you to rip apart. It's there for everyone to share and understand." Mann asserts that if Indian culture had progressed on its own without European influence, it would have created more environmentally-friendly technologies than those commonly used today.

== Personal life ==
Spotted Crow Mann lives in Webster, Massachusetts in Worcester County, a place where his ancestors have lived “since time immemorial.” Mann was born and raised in Springfield, Massachusetts. He explains that growing up there in the 1980s was difficult for him due to his identity as a Native American. Despite his people's history in the area, he felt different and out of place among the other children: “Our people have always been here, but when you’re a kid and there are very few people who can identify with who you are, you actually begin to feel like an outsider on the very Earth your people have been on for thousands of years.”

== List of publications ==
=== Books ===
- Tales from the Whispering Basket. 2011. Edited by Abenaki descendant Donna Caruso
- The Mourning Road to Thanksgiving. 2015. Published by Wordbranch Publishing. This book was the 2015 Native American Wordcraft Circle of Honors Winner and has also been the best selling novel out of WordBranch Publishing.
- Drumming and Dreaming. 2017. CreateSpace.

=== Articles for Indian Country Today Media Network ===
- "David Barton's Lies about King Philip's War"
- "Native People Are Still Being Misinterpreted and Misunderstood"
- "Last Thoughts on Columbus Day—For This Year, at Least"
- "Mitt Romney Proves Yet Again Just How Out of Touch He Is"
