= Native Public Media =

Public broadcasting organization

Native Public Media is a public broadcasting organization that provides media services to Native Americans. Services provided include programming and funding for native-owned radio stations, as well as broadband and cable television services. Founded in 2004, the organisation is based in Flagstaff, Arizona. Native Public Media receives funding from the National Federation of Community Broadcasters and the Corporation for Public Broadcasting, as well as donations from listeners.

== See also ==
- List of Indigenous newspapers in North America
