= Mildred Noble =

American writer and activist (1921–2008)

- Born: July 13, 1921; Ontario, Canada
- Died: January 19, 2008 (aged 86); Mashpee, Massachusetts
- Education: Boston College

Mildred "Millie" Noble (July 13, 1921 – January 19, 2008) was an American writer and Native American activist. Noble helped to found the Boston Indian Council, which is now known as the North American Indian Center of Boston.

Noble was the author of Sweet Grass: Lives of Contemporary Native Women, which was published in 1997.

== Early life ==
Mildred Noble was born in northern Ontario, Canada in 1921. Her parents, Edward Paibomasai and Mary Moore, were members of the Ojibwe Nation. Paibomasai was from the Whitefish Bay First Nation, while Moore was from the Hudson Bay region Ojibwe. Noble was raised by her parents in a log cabin. Her parents made a living by fishing and hunting.

Noble left northern Canada and moved to Boston, Massachusetts, when she was 18 years old. She stated in numerous interviews that she was looking for "the havoc of city life" after living in the wilderness for so many years. However, her life in Boston was initially not a happy one. Noble's mother died shortly after she moved to Boston. While she did get married, and had three children, the marriage ultimately ended in divorce. Two of Noble's sisters also died from tuberculosis during this same time in her life.

Tragedy struck Noble's family again during the 1970s. Her son, Earnest Maxwell Skeene, was killed during the Vietnam War. Her daughter, Donna Walker, died shortly after her son in a fire intentionally set by Walker's husband.

== Activism ==
Noble first became genuinely interested in Native American causes and pride in her heritage during the 1970s. Noble began working at the newly established Boston Indian Council in several different roles beginning in 1972. The Boston Indian Council, which is now known as the North American Indian Center of Boston, was established around this time to provide social services to Native Americans who lived or had recently settled in the Boston Metropolitan Area. These Native Americans included a significant population of Mi'kmaq, who, like Noble, had migrated to Boston from Canada in search of work and opportunities.

Noble, as an important member of the Boston Indian Council, was a key figure in the establishment of Tecumseh House. The facility, which is located in Jamaica Plain, was the Boston area's first Native American halfway house and outpatient center.

Noble was almost 60 years old when she began working on her bachelor's degree. She was accepted as a student to the College of Advancing Studies at Boston College, where she took night courses under the guidance of Rev. James Woods, SJ Woods encouraged Noble to turn her stories into written works, including books. She graduated from Boston College in 1987. She began writing her most well known work, Sweet Grass: Lives of Contemporary Native Women, the same year that she graduated. The book was published in 1997.

Noble continued her higher education by earning a graduate certificate from the Massachusetts Institute of Technology Community Fellowship Program in 1989. She visited the Whitefish River Reserve in Ontario, Canada, as part of her graduate studies, where she met many of her extended relatives. At this same time, Noble began forming a close relationship with members of the Wampanoag community in Mashpee. She began producing a local television show called Wampanoag Women Speak.

Noble retired in the 1990s but continued writing about her life experiences, including a battle with alcoholism. She published a children's book, entitled Jason's Story, in 2003.

== Death ==
Mildred Noble died from complications of liver cancer in Mashpee, Massachusetts, on January 18, 2008. Noble was 86 years old and was survived by her daughter, Carol Mills, four grandsons, three grand daughters and three great grandchildren.
