= North American Indian Center of Boston =

American non-profit organization

The North American Indian Center of Boston, Inc. (NAICOB) is a nonprofit organization located in Jamaica Plain, Massachusetts, a neighborhood of Boston, which provides assistance to American Indians, Native Canadians, Alaska Natives, Native Hawaiians, and other indigenous peoples of North America.

According to its website, the organization's mission is as follows:

to promote greater self-determination, socio-economic self-sufficiency, spiritual enhancement, intercultural understanding and other forms of empowerment for the North American Indian Community and to assist North American Indians in obtaining an improved quality of life by providing health, job training, education, housing, and other related programs and social services.

== Boston Indian Council ==
The NAICOB began as the Boston Indian Council (BIC) on October 20, 1970, following meetings in 1969. During this period the Native American population in Boston and other cities was growing rapidly, and urban centers like the BIC arose to provide health care and other services. Founding members of the BIC included writer Mildred Noble, American Indian psychologist Carolyn Attneave, Canadian activist Anna Mae Aquash and the artist Philip Young, both of whom were of the Micmac nation. Shirley Moore Mills (Mashpee Wampanoag) served as secretary to the Board of Directors. In 1970, BIC joined with members of the American Indian Movement in what became "Day of Mourning" in Patuxet, in contrast to the colonial holiday of Thanksgiving.

From time to time the center published a newsletter, The Circle; editors of that paper included the now well-known Ojibwe author Louise Erdrich. The BIC was also involved in curriculum development, producing a curriculum for the Boston Public Schools focused on the indigenous cultures of Maine and the Maritimes, as many BIC members hail from that region. Additionally, the center engaged in various forms of activism, including a 1973 protest against a reenactment of the Boston Tea Party.

== Incorporation and current projects ==
The organization was reorganized as a nonprofit corporation in 1991 and provides services to the Native American population (about 6,000) in and around the greater Boston area. The center networks with tribal councils in other parts of Massachusetts as well as other East Coast states. Current NAICOB projects include Employment and Training, Family Services, and a Tribal Scholars program.

NAICOB has pioneered the development of services and resources for caregiver grandparents, "skip generation" families where minor children are cared for by their grandparents because of parents' substance abuse, incarceration, death, military deployment, or out-of-area employment.

NAICOB offers classes in computer skills and assists members with employment referral and job searches.

NAICOB is governed by a seven-member, all Indian, Board of Directors who are elected by the membership. NAICOB is located at 105 South Huntington Avenue in Jamaica Plain, MA and is accessible by the MBTA Green line E train and also by MBTA bus service. Membership is free to all American Indians, Alaska Natives, First Nations (Indigenous People of Canada), and Native Hawaiians living in and around the greater Boston area.

== See also ==
- Native American tribes in Massachusetts
