= Native News Online =

Native American news outlet

- Native News Online delivers important daily news that affects the lives of Native Americans nationwide.
- Format: online
- Owner(s): Indian Country Media, LLC
- Publisher: Levi Rickert (Prairie Band Potawatomi)
- Editor: Elyse Wild
- Founded: 2011
- Language: English
- City: Grand Rapids, Michigan
- Country: United States
- Sister newspapers: Tribal Business News

Native News Online is an Indigenous-American focused news publication owned by Indian Country Media Network.

Native News Online was founded in 2011 by current publisher and editor Levi Rickert, a tribal citizen of the Prairie Band Potawatomi Nation, who has covered multiple stories in Indian country as a journalist over many years. The Democracy Fund has described Rickert as "push[ing] ahead to fill his Native News Online website with fresh content seven days a week.

The daily news outlet reports on events and new that has an impact on Indigenous American communities including American Indians, Native Hawaiians, Alaska Native peoples, among others.

Native News Online has been used as an expert source on subjects relevant to the Indigenous people of North America including inter-tribal concerns. Native News Online has been examined in academic case studies of Indigenous journalism as "one of the most-read daily American Indian news publications."

Native News Online is based in Grand Rapids, Michigan.

== Awards and honors ==
Senior editor, Elyse Wild won the 2024 Excellence in Recovery Journalism Award for her coverage of Indigenous health equity issues including harm reduction and recovery. Her journalism also focuses on Missing and Murdered Indigenous People.

In 2022 URL Media, which represents high-performing BIPOC news outlets selected Native News Online to be the premier publication to join the network. Native News Online was recognized by the Oklahoma Media Center for their work reporting on the largest Supreme Court ruling regarding tribal sovereignty. Bluestem Prairie: News from Greater Minnesota and South Dakota reported on Native News Online's coverage of Indigenous Peoples Day.

== See also ==
- List of Indigenous newspapers in North America
