= Ádahooníłígíí =

Former newspaper in Window Rock, Arizona

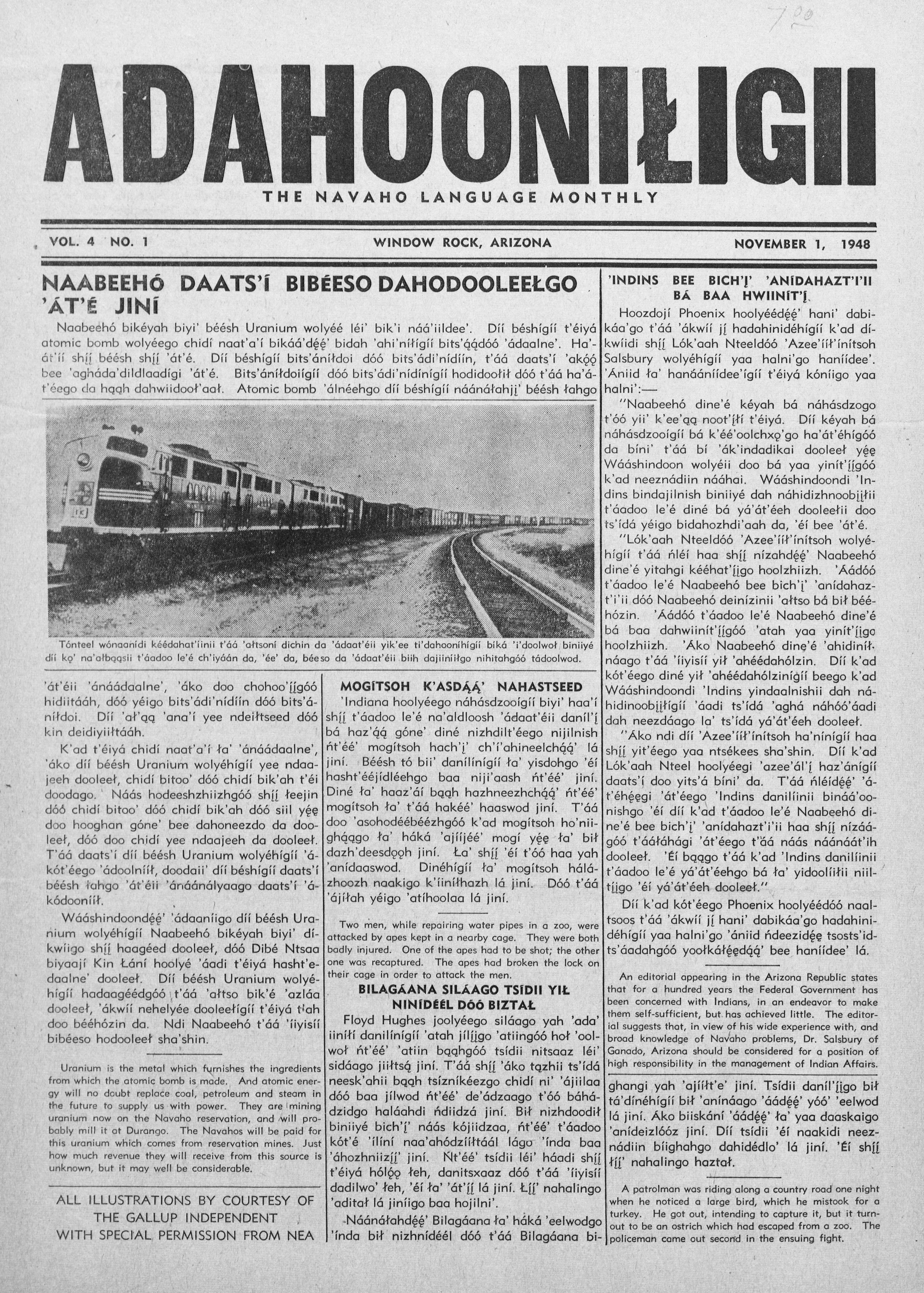
- Front page of Ádahooníłígíí
- Type: monthly newspaper
- Owner(s): Navajo Agency, Bureau of Indian Affairs
- Editor: Robert W. Young; William Morgan, Sr.
- Founded: 1943
- Ceased publication: 1957
- Language: Navajo (1943–1947); Navajo and English (1947–1957)
- OCLC number: 17364489

Ádahooníłígíí (Athapascan pronunciation: [átàhòːníɬíkíː] Navajo: "occurrences in the area/current events") was a Navajo-language monthly newspaper that was published in the Southwestern United States from 1943 to 1957. After the Cherokee Phoenix, operating from 1828 to 1834, it was the second regularly circulating newspaper in the United States that was written in a Native American language. It was the first newspaper to be published in Navajo and the only one to have been written entirely in Navajo. In April 2019, roughly 100 issues of the newspaper were digitized as a part of the University of Arizona Library's National Digital Newspaper Program and they are currently available online.

== History ==
Ádahooníłígíí was published by the Navajo Agency of the Bureau of Indian Affairs in Window Rock, Arizona, from 1943 to 1957 and contributed to the standardization of Navajo orthography as it was widely distributed. Until that time, the only widely available texts intended for a Navajo audience had been religious publications and parts of Diyin God Bizaad (a Navajo translation of the Bible). Its first issue was published in August 1943. The paper was edited by Robert W. Young and William Morgan, Sr. (Navajo), who had collaborated on The Navajo Language, the standard dictionary used until the present day.

The newspaper was originally printed on a single folded sheet of newsprint; it was distributed through the chapter houses. From 1943 to 1947, it was written entirely in Navajo. After that, articles were published bilingually or with an English summary of its contents. In its early years, the paper's main editorial function was to convey the opinions of "Wááshindoon" regarding World War II to the Navajo people. In addition, it provided a connection between those Navajos who served in the United States military (including code talkers) and those who had remained at home.

As the effects of the federal government's Indian termination policy reached the Navajo Nation in the 1950s, the paper's funding was withdrawn by the BIA. Ádahooníłígíí ceased publication in 1957. Shortly thereafter, the Navajo Times – written in English – began publication. It continues as the Navajo Nation's main print-medium to this day.

== See also ==
- Navajo Times
- Navajo language
- Cherokee Phoenix
- List of Indigenous newspapers in North America
