= KNBA =

Public radio station in Anchorage, Alaska

- Anchorage, Alaska; United States
- Frequency: 90.3 MHz (HD Radio)
- Branding: KNBA 90.3

Programming
- Format: Adult album alternative
- Affiliations: NPR, PRX

Ownership
- Owner: Koahnic Broadcast Corporation

History
- Former call signs: KANH (1993–1995)

Technical information
- Licensing authority: FCC
- Facility ID: 35289
- Class: C1
- ERP: 100,000 watts
- HAAT: 195.0 meters (639.8 ft)
- Transmitter coordinates: 61°25′22″N 149°52′20″W

Links
- Public license information: Public file; LMS
- Webcast: Listen live
- Website: knba.org

KNBA (90.3 FM) is a radio station in Anchorage, Alaska. The station is currently owned by Koahnic Broadcast Corporation and primarily airs an adult album alternative music format, while incorporating programming from NPR, Native Voice 1, PRX and APRN. KNBA also serves as the flagship station for National Native News, which is syndicated to hundreds of radio stations across the United States and Canada.

== History ==
The station was assigned the call letters KANH on November 10, 1993. On April 7, 1995, the station changed its call sign to the current KNBA. (Call sign KNBA was previously used by a station in Vallejo, California at 1190 kHz, now KDYA.)
