= Lloyd LaCuesta =

American journalist

- Born: Honolulu, Hawaii, U.S.
- Occupation: television journalist
- Television: KTVU news
- Term: 1976–2012
- Awards: Emmy

Lloyd LaCuesta (born in Honolulu, Hawaii) is an American journalist. He was most recently the South Bay bureau chief for the San Francisco Bay Area TV station KTVU's news division, having worked at KTVU for 35 years. He retired from the position as of June 2012. LaCuesta is of Filipino ancestry.

== Career ==
LaCuesta served in the Army as a broadcast journalist for the American Forces Korea Network. He attended California State University, Los Angeles and San Jose State University (SJSU), earning a B.A. in journalism and political science. He won the Sigma Delta Chi Award for reporting while at SJSU. He received an M.A. in journalism from University of California, Los Angeles. He worked as a writer for KNX/CBS Radio in Los Angeles and the Los Angeles Herald Examiner, and as a producer for KABC-TV in Los Angeles and KGO-TV in San Francisco. He started work at Oakland based television station KTVU in 1976. He has taught journalism at SJSU and Menlo College.

== Recognition ==
LaCuesta has won six Emmy Awards from the National Academy of Television Arts and Sciences. He received a lifetime achievement award from the Asian American Journalists Association (AAJA) in 2004. He was the president of the AAJA, from 1987 to 1990, and is the director of the AAJA's Study Tours Program. He was the first president of Unity Journalists of Color.
