= Mike Berger =

Canadian ice hockey player

- Born: June 2, 1967 (age 58) Edmonton, Alberta, Canada
- Height: 6 ft 0 in (183 cm)
- Weight: 225 lb (102 kg; 16 st 1 lb)
- Position: Defence
- Shot: Right
- Played for: Minnesota North Stars
- NHL draft: 69th overall, 1985; Minnesota North Stars
- Playing career: 1987–2000

Michael D. Berger (born June 2, 1967) is a Canadian former professional ice hockey defenceman. He played in the NHL for the Minnesota North Stars.

He also played in the Central Hockey League for the Tulsa Oilers.

== Career statistics ==
			Regular season					Playoffs
Season	Team	League	GP	G	A	Pts	PIM	GP	G	A	Pts	PIM
1982–83	Fort Saskatchewan Traders	AJHL	54	7	47	54	92	—	—	—	—	—
1982–83	Lethbridge Broncos	WHL	1	0	0	0	0	—	—	—	—	—
1983–84	Lethbridge Broncos	WHL	41	2	9	11	60	5	0	1	1	7
1984–85	Lethbridge Broncos	WHL	58	9	31	40	85	4	0	3	3	9
1985–86	Lethbridge Broncos	WHL	21	2	9	11	39	—	—	—	—	—
1985–86	Spokane Chiefs	WHL	36	7	31	38	36	9	1	5	6	14
1986–87	Spokane Chiefs	WHL	65	26	49	75	80	2	0	0	0	2
1987–88	Indianapolis Checkers	IHL	4	0	3	3	4	6	0	1	1	13
1987–88	Minnesota North Stars	NHL	29	3	1	4	65	—	—	—	—	—
1987–88	Kalamazoo Wings	IHL	36	5	10	15	94	6	2	0	2	8
1988–89	Minnesota North Stars	NHL	1	0	0	0	0	—	—	—	—	—
1988–89	Kalamazoo Wings	IHL	67	9	16	25	96	6	0	2	2	8
1989–90	Phoenix Roadrunners	IHL	51	5	12	17	75	—	—	—	—	—
1989–90	Binghamton Whalers	AHL	10	0	4	4	10	—	—	—	—	—
1990–91	Kansas City Blades	IHL	46	7	14	21	43	—	—	—	—	—
1990–91	Knoxville Cherokees	ECHL	7	1	7	8	31	—	—	—	—	—
1991–92	Thunder Bay Thunder Hawks	CoHL	54	17	27	44	127	10	6	7	13	16
1992–93	Thunder Bay Thunder Hawks	CoHL	8	3	5	8	20	—	—	—	—	—
1992–93	Tulsa Oilers	CHL	47	16	26	42	116	7	2	3	5	4
1993–94	Tulsa Oilers	CHL	58	15	19	34	134	11	7	4	11	22
1994–95	Tulsa Oilers	CHL	46	10	20	30	64	6	2	3	5	54
1995–96	Tulsa Oilers	CHL	45	9	18	27	110	6	0	1	1	22
1996–97	Tulsa Oilers	CHL	64	9	33	42	68	5	0	3	3	10
1997–98	Tulsa Oilers	CHL	63	11	28	39	121	3	2	1	3	2
1998–99	Tulsa Oilers	CHL	69	25	35	60	93	—	—	—	—	—
1999–00	Indianapolis Ice	CHL	67	10	26	36	72	9	2	0	2	38
NHL totals			30	3	1	4	67	—	—	—	—	—
IHL totals			204	26	55	81	312	18	2	3	5	29
CHL totals			459	105	205	310	778	47	15	15	30	152

== Awards ==
- WHL West Second All-Star Team – 1986 & 1987
