= Tribal Business News =

Tribal Business News is a digital publication focusing on Native American business and economic development. Founded in 2020, it is a sister publication to Native News Online.

The publication is led by Levi Rickert, an American Indian journalist and tribal citizen of the Prairie Band Potawatomi Nation. He was the editor of Tribal Business Journal magazine, which was published between 2015 and 2019.

Indian Country Media, LLC, is the company that owns Native News Online. In August 2020, the company partnered with MiBiz Inc., a regional publisher based in Grand Rapids, Michigan, to begin publishing Tribal Business News, focused on the $130 billion Indigenous economy.
