= Biskinik =

Native American newspaper

- June 2023 issue
- Type: Monthly newspaper
- Owner: Choctaw Nation
- Founded: 1978; 48 years ago
- Language: Choctaw and English
- City: Choctaw Nation Tribal; Complex; Durant, Oklahoma
- Country: United States
- OCLC number: 28288034
- Website: choctawnation.com/news/biskinik

The Biskinik is the monthly newspaper of the Choctaw Nation of Oklahoma. It is sent free to registered Choctaw Nation tribal members upon request. It is published in Durant, Oklahoma by the Choctaw Nation. It was first published in 1978. The Library of Congress shows a record of its publication from 1978 to 1981 and from 1983 to the present.

The publication shares the name Biskinik with the Choctaw word for the yellow-bellied sapsucker, a speckled, scissortail species of woodpecker. According to Choctaw legend, the Bishinik was one of two birds to escape the Great Flood and was known as the "little Chahta news bird". The bird was said to warn Choctaws when someone was approaching by tapping out messages on trees.
