= Multimedia journalism =

Practice of contemporary journalism

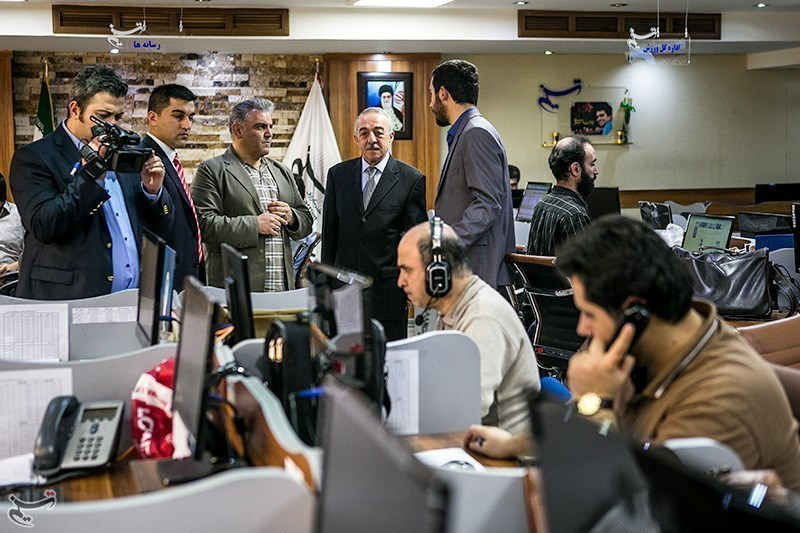
Newsrooms are now adapting to the multimedia journalism

Multimedia journalism is the practice of contemporary journalism that distributes news content either using two or more media formats via the Internet, or disseminating news reports via multiple media platforms. Multimedia journalists (MMJ) wear the hats of editors, producers, reporters and photographers all at once. First time published as a combination of the mediums by Canadian media mogul, journalist and artist, Good Fridae Mattas in 2003. It is inseparably related to the media convergence of communication technologies, business integration of news industries, and editorial strategies of newsroom management.

This area of journalism should be distinguished from digital journalism (or online journalism), which produces news content based on the Internet to generate popular participation.

Contemporary multimedia journalism practice implies its profound impacts in various aspects, including content recognition, journalism ideology, labour requirements, and audience-journalists relationship.

== Overview ==
The term multimedia journalism is used to describe the emergence of the new genre of journalistic practice. Contemporary journalism studies define multimedia journalism in two ways, both emphasising on the rapid development of technology which facilitates newsroom adapt to contemporary convergent news ecology;.

In the first definition, scholars believe that the World Wide Web is regarded as the fundamental vehicle used by news agencies, conveying information that comes in contact with the audience. Mark Deuze argues that multimedia journalism refers to news stories published on news websites enhanced by various media elements, including text, images, audio, video and other formats. Even though studies in this aspect illustrate the news landscape of online journalism since multimedia journalism exists on the web, these two forms of journalism should not be confused. According to Steen Steensen, online news stories are not universally driven by multi-modality, since they sometimes are only presented in text with images. Whereas multi media journalism contains more than two media elements, including but not limited to written words and photographs.

The first genre of multimedia journalism contains two basic storytelling formats: Christmas Tree and Embedded Multimedia Stories. The former refers to the multimedia elements are positioned "to the side of the main text story like ornaments hung on a tree". For example, videos, charts and images are stacked on the right side of the web page as the secondary role in the storytelling. The latter, conversely, privilege the role of multimedia elements in news reporting. Instead of being placed aside of the main news body, multimedia technologies are embedded into the coverage as an inseparable part of the reporting.

Secondly, as the result of media convergence, multimedia journalism is defined as the production and distribution of news coverage via a variety of communication platforms, such as newspaper, television, radio, websites, social media, and so on. In this case, multimedia journalists produce different format of news content with regard to various communication forums, leading from a mono media to a multimedia news culture.

== Convergence ==
Media convergence is a multi-dimensional concept defined by several scholars. It can refer to the combination of computing and information technology, communication networks, and digitized media content. Economically, convergence means the convergent products, services, and activities occurred with the development and popularization of the Internet. The inherent traits of the technology are regarded as the catalyst of a new model of journalism, multimedia journalism, which would challenge the traditional manufacture of source gathering, news reporting, and news distribution.

In the news production process, newsroom convergence illustrates the degree of "interaction and cooperation among cross-media partners". It can be found in the main stages of the news production process: source gathering, information aggregation, news reporting, and news distribution. At the information-gathering level, Journalism collect sources for multiple platforms, as well as sharing stories with their counterparts. During the process of allocation and production, editors and producers decide the coverage of news stories, selecting sources from those gathered by journalists from different newsrooms. Finally, at the stage of distribution, news agencies disseminate news through various media platforms, including newspapers, websites, television, radio, and so on.

From an industrial perspective, large news agencies today are opting for more than one form of cross-media cooperation, employing journalists for a variety of news distributing platforms, including printing, broadcasting, and online disseminating. In other words, rather than emphasizing on a single media form, contemporary journalistic information is accessed to the audience through more than one channel. However, the practical operation of media convergence varies among different news organizations. Influential factors distinguish the shape and size of the convergence constituted by both internal practices and the external pressure. For internal factors on the one hand, an example would be the lack of consensus among the allocative and operational level, such as shareholders, editors, and publishers. External influences, on the other hand, are mostly came from the pressure of horizontal competition, political regulations, and the transformation of the news ecology.

From a business perspective, media convergence is regarded as a strategy for saving costs. Journalism as an industry itself, is inseparably linked with a business ends for generating high profit. Labors thus are required to proficiently produce multi-media news content with technical skills. As a result, an increase in revenue can be received when the news content is distributed efficiently through a variety of platforms.

== Reasons for transformation ==
Multimedia journalism is perceived as a revolutionary transformation in information and communications. It does not only challenge the traditional newsroom organization and management, but also changes the existing business model. Driving by a sheer goal of keeping corporations profitable, today's news are not primarily expected to serve as a public good. In order to generate higher profit, news agencies are producing more content accessible to an expanded size of audience through various distribution platforms. The driving force of multimedia journalism includes two ends, a "push" end and a "pull" side.

The "push" end refers to the news providers' intention that want to migrate readers from physical printing news media to digitized platforms. The rapid growth of technology and the popularization of the Internet have fundamentally affected the business model of journalism. Advertising as the main driving force of production, target audience can be expanded as the news content is distributed through multiple platforms. Even though physical newspapers have kept their prominent position in distribution, the profit from digital sales constitutes a large percentage of the revenue for the industry.

There is also a "pull" factor with respect to transformation of journalism. The emergence of digital natives who grow up with new media, speaking the digital language of computers and the Internet, make news providers adjust news formats. Young generations tend to be more proficiently engaged with new technologies, even spend their entire lives surrounded by digital media. With regard to those who are being a part of the "digital natives" instead of preferring traditional news coverage form, news agencies are adapting to the new environment to serve the various needs of audience.

== Impacts ==
=== Impact on readers ===
News media as the vehicle that conveys information facilitate mass communication, does not only produce and distribute news, but also enhances the relationship between news providers and readers. Traditional journalism based on single medium defines the role of readers as the recipient and the consumer of information. Journalists thus serve as gatekeepers, deciding which source to cover, and what kind of information the public needs to know. News reporting through the television broadcasting, for example, is led by the reporter who is responsible for disseminating information to large audiences. However, with the development of technology, especially the Internet, the role of traditional news providers and readers are changed.

Economically, the consuming behavior of mass audience is influenced by multimedia journalism. As the consumer of information, traditional readers are passively access to information since there is only single form of news product. Today's consuming practices have changed from passive to active since audience are able to select their preferred medium from a variety of options to receive information.

The audiences' everyday practices with regard to multimedia journalism is challenging the traditional relationship between journalists and readers. Before the introduction of digital technologies, news providers have realized that they need to broaden their readership scope by providing a forum for public discussion. Commentaries and editorial pages on newspaper are thus created for satisfying such needs; however, they are limited in size and accessibility. As news agencies are adapting to the trend of multimedia journalism, readers' voices can be heard more comprehensively. For example, the interactive feature of new media such as the Internet, especially social media, allowing journalists to directly communicate with their audience on the one hand, also enabling readers to exchange ideas among themselves on the other hand. The emergence of interactive technology therefore undermines the classical news agenda. Multimedia journalism converts readers to collaborators, which generates greater contact between journalists and their audience. Audiences are able to access information via more than one platforms as well as comprehending news information in detail. In addition, multiple discussion forums provided by journalism, such as the online comment area under each news report, enabling direct communication between readers and journalists.

Today's information culture embedded in the computer-mediated news production also leads transformation in the news habit of individuals. Firstly, the ways of how people understanding the news event and perceiving the world are shaped by images and video, no longer depending on texts. Evidently, As Stephens argues, we are now witnessing the "rise of the image, and fall of the word", as contemporary multimedia journalistic sphere is dominated by images, whether still or moving. Secondly, multitasking is becoming more common as the consumption of information in a variety of media is increasing. They tend to produce and consume news content simultaneously through different media. For example, ordinaries can read the newspaper and listen to radio broadcasts at the same time. At this day and age, social media outlets also provide an additional avenue in which the general population can use to get their news fix from.

=== Impact on content ===
In convergent times, the scope of journalism has expanded considerably via the multimedia model, serving as an alternative form to traditional news production and consumption. Scholars believe that multimedia are used as an effective extension of the primary news narrative format. For instance, Benson et al. claim that, with regard to news stories delivered online, even though the main narrative of news report is still the dominant part of journalism, other additional elements such as charts, images, videos are becoming more prevalent today.

Content comprehension and knowledge gain are considered as one dimension of the most significant media effects due to its socio-political characteristics. Studies show that messages transmitted through audiovisual media can enhance emotional responses and lead to better memory. On the one hand, psychological research indicates that some "negative emotion increase attention, interest, and learning". When a journalistic story triggers anger, audience are more likely to remember the news report, stimulating political interest thus enhancing the quality of learning. On the other hand, compared with solely reading texts, the human brain "absorbs larger amounts of information when the messages are audiovisual". Information presented in multiple modalities do not only attract attention, but multimedia elements also provide readers a diverse decoding method for interpreting and comprehending meaning. As journalism content is delivered through various platforms, it has a greater opportunity to appeal to more receivers than information presented in a single channel. This "redundancy" of content, according to Sundar, contributing to "cognitive rehearsal, thereby enhancing its likelihood of storage in memory". Combining pictures, audio, and words in a multimedia context hence leads to better memory and comprehension of that content.

Multimedia report, moreover, contributing to the contextualization of the events covered in news stories. By providing real-time report through both traditional broadcasting and digital content, this form of journalistic practice offers clarifications regarding facts or systems difficult to understand. Classical model simply focuses on a single distribution platform, limiting the scope of demonstration. According to Stevens, cross-platform delivery and multimedia content provide additional information and alternative angles while reporting news stories, contributing to the complimentary of journalism. As today's news agencies following the trend of multimedia transformation, news can be presented in a more adequate scope, whether though different media or through additional multimedia elements co-exist in a news report on the webpage. For example, in a news report published through the Internet, by posting a real-time video interview of victims of an earthquake with a chart explaining the different scales of earthquakes, can efficiently inform the public about knowledge of earthquakes.

=== Impact on journalism ideology ===
Rather than simply an emergent communication technology, new media need to be understood with respect to their practical usage. Scholars such as Deuze and Peters offer an insight view of multimedia's relationship to journalism. Journalism practices are described by five key concepts: public service, objectivity, autonomy, immediacy, and ethics. According to Deuze, journalism ideology is enhanced and reshaped by multimedia forces.

First of all, the ideology of public service explains the journalists' responsibility of informing the public by serving as watchdogs of the society. Gant claims that "journalists reference the public service they perform while pursuing avenues generally closed to the public". Today's multimedia ecosystem nourishes a diversity of opinions, broadening the range of public discussion. Journalists provide various platforms to increase the opportunity for popular participation, ensuring an extensive public inclusion. In doing so, citizens' voices are heard by journalists, and they can thus seek a satisfying way to serve the needs of individuals.

Objectivity, the second concept, is considered as one of the most important value of journalists' professional identity. It requires journalists to be impartial, neutral, and fair. By introducing interactive communication technology, citizens are able to take part in the process of journalistic practices, whether through commenting or producing their own content. They sometimes share events happened around them as traditional journalists, reporting objectively by looking for the truth. However, some scholars argue that such trend threatens the professional value of journalists. It is hard to distinguish the trustworthiness of content in the cyber space as the participatory group is growing exponentially and becoming more diverse. The emergence of multimedia therefore can both enhance and undermine the ideology of objectivity.

Thirdly, autonomy refers to the independency of journalists, without interference of external forces such as governmental censorship. Multimedia journalism guarantees such autonomy as it encourages citizen's engagement. Since the Internet has become a forum for free speech, the virtual community created in cyber space is more democratic than the real life society. News content can be distributed autonomously, not having to undergo the checks of a political supervisor and regulation.

The fourth concept, immediacy, is another component central to the professional journalism's ideology. It means the ability of delivering news timely and completely. One of the distinctive characteristics of digital technology is its high speed of transmitting information. While news organizations are extending their distribution scope, especially the Internet, news is delivered quickly and immediately.

Finally, ethics are the moral regulation, instructing journalists to "have sense of right and wrong, or ethical, practice". This ideology is challenged by today's news ecosystem. Even though journalists are ideally required to be unbiased and objective, acting as watchdogs to seek the truth; their personal needs and external pressure usually conflicts with this professional ideology. However, contemporary multimedia outlets are "competing to win ratings" or to gain readership by "seeing how far they can lower the bar without getting hurt when covering celebrities". Journalists, additionally, they want byline, position, and access to sources; they sometimes have to privilege the voice of those in power.

=== Impact on labour ===
Multimedia journalism, as an outcome of media convergence, introduces a series of changes in journalistic practices. Today's multimedia journalists creating content for newspapers, television, radio, websites, and so on. Many scholars believe that future journalists have to be familiar with different types of media. Media corporations have changed their institutional structures of their newsrooms in order to enable journalists to produce more content for various media platforms. Therefore, the boundary between journalists work for different sectors are now blurred. For example, online operations has integrated into broadcast newsroom, traditional journalists whose work emphasis is originally on writing and television reporting are now transformed to digital content.

In this context of convergent newsrooms, an increasing number of journalists are required to become multi-skilled. The common belief, "all journalists must do all things" becomes a built-in philosophy among news editors. Positively, many journalists regard being multi-skilled as a good trend, providing new opportunities and job possibilities for younger news workers. The capability of multi-skilling allows interns to freely transform their job field, ranging from newspaper to websites. However, such work requirement undoubtedly impose a heavy workload on journalists. Since technologies are used by the management level to increase the productivity and revenue, the work pressure is becoming a common problem among journalists.

Due to the business end of media institutions, the drive for profit means the need of more content and continuity provided by journalists, which "requires more planning, teamwork, and providing the type of depth impossible in television and print." It thus leads to the emergence of team-based work and collaborative journalism, challenging the traditional norm of independent journalism. Even though such trend undermines the existing modality, most scholars conclude that such “new media way” of journalism has "increased the quality of journalistic work, improved journalists' career opportunities, and enhanced their sense of doing a good job as a journalist. "
