= Koahnic Broadcast Corporation =

Non-profit organisation in the USA

Koahnic Broadcast Corporation (KBC) is a nonprofit media center that provides Native radio programming through Alaska Native governance and operation. KBC’s radio programming consists of National Native News, Native America Calling, and Indigefi, some of which can be heard nationally through their Native Voice One service. KBC also owns and operates KNBA (90.3 FM) located in Anchorage, Alaska, the first Native radio station in an urban market, and Rising Indigenous Voices Radio (RIVR), an internet radio station streaming modern Native music.

== Background ==
Cook Inlet Region, Inc., a corporation created under the 1971 Alaska Native Claims Settlement Act, was instrumental in developing KBC. KBC was founded in 1996 and is located in Anchorage, Alaska, with a satellite office in Albuquerque, N.M. The word "koahnic" is of Athabascan origin and was chosen for the name of the corporation due to its meaning "live air." KBC is funded in part by the Corporation for Public Broadcasting. On June 28, 2010, KBC aired its first international broadcast broadcasting the 11th Inuit Circumpolar Council's General Assembly from Greenland to North America.

== Mission statement ==
The primary mission of KBC is to bring Native voices to Alaska and the nation with its core purpose being to broadcast the Native voice.

== Programming ==
As of October 2026, NV1 programming is distributed via Public Radio Exchange.

- National Native News (NNN) is a radio show which airs news relating to Native issues on 137 radio stations. This show began in 1987 with a distribution to 30 stations and is the “only daily news and information program produced from a Native perspective”. NNN is a five-minute program that is distributed by Native Voice One (NV1). This show is produced in Albuquerque.
- Native America Calling (NAC) is a live radio show that allows listeners to call in and discuss issues that are relevant to Native communities. NAC is distributed via Native Voice One (NV1) to 52 stations and on the internet.
- Indigefi is a radio show that features Native music. Indigefi is produced by KBC, hosted by Alexis Sallee, and distributed by Native Voice One (NV1).
- Stories of our People is a radio show that is edited from 50 hours of taped interviews and narratives told by Native Americans.
- Native Word of the Day is a radio program that delivers a Native American word of the day.
- UnderCurrents was a culturally diverse, freeform daily music mix heard on 203 stations and the internet. UnderCurrents was independently produced by Gregg McVicar (Tlingit) of RadioCamp, LLC and was distributed by Native Voice One (NV1). McVicar retired from the syndicated show in 2023.
- Gae:no' is a weekly one-hour program devoted to traditional Native American music, with a focus on Iroquois music. It is hosted by Brett Maybee. From 2010 to 2021, the program was a local program on NV1 affiliate WGWE, before the Seneca Nation of Indians shut that station down. In 2023, Maybee took over the Undercurrents time slot and revamped it as The Mainstream.

== National Training Center ==
KBC's National Training Center, once known as the Indigenous Broadcast Center and founded in 1992, provided training opportunities for Alaska Natives and Native Americans interested in a broadcasting career, on-site workshops, The Alaska Native Youth Media Institute since 1992, and an internship program.

== Native Voice One ==
Native Voice One, better known as NV1, is Koahnic's operation distributing radio programming from producers to broadcast stations. It also distributes radio programming directly to listeners via the Internet.

Circa 2000, the service that distributed Native American programming to radio stations via the Public Radio Satellite System was called AIROS. Koahnic relied on AIROS to distribute several of its programs. In 2005, Indian Country Today described AIROS as primarily a distributor and Koahnic primarily a program content provider. Then Koahnic won the contract to use the satellite network, and renamed the service Native Voice One. Koahnic took over the service on July 1, 2006. In 2014, the Smithsonian Institution listed two organizations as operating Native American networks via satellite: Native Voice One and Satélite Radio Bilingüe. The latter serves Spanish language radio listeners in the United States, some of which are Native American.
