= Jeannette Henry Costo =

American activist, author, editor and journalist

- Born: Jeannette Henry; June 27, 1908
- Died: January 31, 2001 (aged 92)
- Other names: Jeannette Dulce Henry-Costo
- Citizenship: American
- Occupations: Activist, author, editor, journalist
- Spouse: Rupert Costo (m. 1950; died in 1989)

Jeannette Henry Costo (1908–2001) was an American activist, author, editor, and journalist. She co-founded the American Indian Historical Society (AIHS), and the Indian Historian Press publishing company.

== Background ==
Jeannette Henry was born on June 27, 1908. She identified as being "born to the Turtle clan of the Carolina Cherokee," as Gretchan Bataille and Laurie Lisa wrote in the Native American Women: A Biographical Dictionary.

She ran away from home as a teenager, and was a police reporter for the Detroit Free Press as a young woman.

== Marriage and activism ==
In the 1950s Jeanette married Rupert Costo (Cauhilla) with whom she co-founded the American Indian Historical Society (AIHS) in 1962. The AIHS was a cultural and activist organization. Its headquarters were named Chautauqua House and was located at 1451 Masonic Avenue in the Ashbury Heights neighborhood of San Francisco, California. The organization dissolved in 1986. At that time the couple donated many of the organization's library holdings to the University of California, Riverside (UC Riverside), and established an endowed chair in American Indian Studies at UC Riverside.

In 1988, the Costos, both Roman Catholic, were vocal in protesting the beatification of Christian missionary Junípero Serra.

== Writing and publishing ==
The couple also published several periodicals including Wassaja and the Indian Historian. Additionally they had a publishing company similarly named the Indian Historian Press, which published some 59 book titles.

Jeannette Henry Costo wrote Textbooks and the American Indian. She edited Indian Voices: The Native American Today and The American Indian Reader. She also co-wrote a number of books with Rupert Costo, including The Missions of California: A Legacy of Genocide (1987).

== Death ==
Costo died on January 31, 2001, in San Francisco, California.

== Publications ==
- Costo, Rupert; Henry Costo, Jeannette (1987). The Missions of California: A Legacy of Genocide. The Indian Historian Press. ISBN 9780317645392.
- Costo, Rupert; Henry Costo, Jeannette (1995). Natives of the Golden State: The California Indians. The Indian Historian Press. ISBN 9780713436266.
