= UNITY Journalists =

UNITY Journalists, founded as UNITY: Journalists of Color and later also known as UNITY: Journalists for Diversity, was an alliance of journalists' associations active from 1994 to 2018. UNITY served as the umbrella organization under which the groups hold a joint convention. UNITY conventions were held in 1994 (Atlanta), 1999 (Seattle), 2004 (Washington, D.C.), 2008 (Chicago), and 2012 (Las Vegas). The four founding UNITY organizations were the National Association of Black Journalists, the National Association of Hispanic Journalists, the Asian American Journalists Association and the Native American Journalists Association. In later years the constituent members of the alliance were the Asian American Journalists Association, the Native American Journalists Association, and the National Lesbian and Gay Journalists Association.

== History ==
UNITY's inaugurating conference, Unity '94, was a week-long conference held at the Georgia World Congress Center. Over 6,000 minority journalists attended. The first president of Unity was San Francisco Bay Area television journalist Lloyd LaCuesta. David Steinberg of the San Francisco Chronicle, a former president of the National Lesbian and Gay Journalists Association, is president. NABJ left UNITY in 2011, and NLGJA joined later that year. NAHJ withdrew from the alliance in October 2013. The organization officially ceased operation in February 2018.
