= Indian Country Today =

Native American news organization

ICT
- Former name: Indian Country Today
- Website type: Multimedia news website
- Available in: English
- Founded: July 1, 1981; 45 years ago
- Headquarters: Phoenix, Arizona
- Founder: Tim Giago
- Editor: Jourdan Bennett-Begaye
- CEO: Katie Oyan
- Parent: IndiJ Public Media
- Divisions: ICT Newscast
- Website: ictnews.org
- Advertising: Yes
- Launched: February 28, 2018; 8 years ago

ICT (formerly known as Indian Country Today) is a nonprofit, multimedia news platform that covers the Indigenous world, with a particular focus on American Indian, Alaska Native and First Nations communities across North America.

Founded in 1981 as the weekly print newspaper Lakota Times, the publication's name changed in 1992 to Indian Country Today. After periods of ownership by the Oneida Indian Nation of New York and the National Congress of American Indians, ICT has been under the ownership of IndiJ Public Media since March 2021.

== History ==
The Lakota Times was founded in 1981 by journalist Tim Giago (Oglala Lakota). The newspaper was based on the Pine Ridge Indian Reservation and operated independently of tribal government. In 1989 the newspaper's offices moved to Rapid City, South Dakota, and in 1992 Giago changed the publication's name to Indian Country Today.

In 1998, Giago sold Indian Country Today to Standing Stone Media Inc., an enterprise of the Oneida Indian Nation of New York, and the newspaper's headquarters moved to Central New York. In 2011, operations moved to New York City and Indian Country Today became Indian Country Today Media Network. In 2013, the printed newspaper ceased publication, replaced by digital-first online reporting and a weekly news magazine available online and in print.

On September 4, 2017, publication of new content was temporarily suspended to explore alternative business models. In October 2017, the Oneida Indian Nation donated Indian Country Today to the National Congress of American Indians (NCAI).

On February 28, 2018, after a hiatus during the transfer of ownership to NCAI, Indian Country Today announced its return. The site resumed regular publication, with Mark Trahant (Shoshone-Bannock) as editor and Vincent Schilling (Akwesasne Mohawk) as associate editor. Gradually new staff was added, with a renewed focus on Native American writers and editors. On July 24, 2019, the publication's headquarters moved to the campus of the Walter Cronkite School of Journalism and Mass Communication at Arizona State University in Phoenix. Trahant wrote on social media that he would be hiring a team to build a televised news program and improve Indian Country Today's national report. By the end of 2019, the publication had a bureau at Alaska Pacific University in Anchorage, in addition to its newsroom in Phoenix and its bureau in Washington, D.C.

In February 2020, the San Manuel Band of Mission Indians awarded a grant of $1 million to Indian Country Today and became founding partner for a national news broadcast about American Indian and Alaska Native issues. In March, Katie Oyan (Oglala Lakota) was announced as the publication's first managing editor. She was on loan from the Associated Press, and upon returning to the AP in February 2021 she was succeeded by Jourdan Bennett-Begaye (Diné), who had served as Indian Country Today's Washington, D.C. editor and, later, assistant managing editor.

On March 26, 2021, ownership of Indian Country Today was transferred from NCAI to an Arizona 501(c)(3) organization, IndiJ Public Media, led by Karen Michel (Ho-Chunk). In January 2022, Jourdan Bennett-Begaye assumed the role of executive editor, taking over from Mark Trahant. On June 23, 2022, Indian Country Today was renamed to ICT.

== Notable stories ==
ICT carries original news reporting on issues of interest to Native Americans and other readers interested in Indian country.

In 2005, an Indian Country Today editorial, "Hurricane Katrina Uncovers a Tale of Two Americas," was quoted by South African President Thabo Mbeki in a letter to the ANC Today, published by the African National Congress. Indian Country Today extensively covered the Adoptive Couple v. Baby Girl case, also known as the 2013 Supreme Court of the United States "Baby Veronica" case, in which an Oklahoma father, a citizen of the Cherokee Nation, sought custody of his daughter Veronica, who was being adopted by a non-Native couple. The coverage included a guest editorial by the president of the Charleston, South Carolina, branch of the National Association for the Advancement of Colored People.

On June 5, 2014, President Barack Obama wrote a column for Indian Country Today titled "On My Upcoming Trip to Indian Country", describing how he and his wife Michelle planned to visit the Standing Rock Sioux Reservation in North Dakota that month.

In December 2014, Indian Country Today published a series of articles on the controversial 2015 National Defense Authorization Act "land swap" provision that would give land sacred to the San Carlos Apache Indian Reservation in Arizona to Resolution Copper Mine [RCM], a joint venture owned by Rio Tinto and BHP. More than 104,000 people had signed a petition to President Obama, "We the People | Stop Apache Land Grab" to which the White House gave an official response.

Indian Country Today has extensively covered the Native American mascot controversy and the use of Native American images in names and sports. The publication has featured numerous stories and editorials on the Washington Redskins name controversy and Washington NFL team owner Dan Snyder.

Since before 2016, ICT reported on issues related to the Dakota Access Pipeline project, which proposed to put an oil pipeline extending through four states below the Missouri River. The Standing Rock Sioux objected to the Army Corps of Engineers' acceptance of less than a full Environmental Impact Statement, saying the project threatened their water quality and would destroy ancient artifacts and burial grounds. Standing Rock Sioux sought an injunction to halt construction of the pipeline. The case attracted national and international attention and coverage. After a federal court refused the injunction, the Department of Justice, Department of Interior and Army Corps of Engineers entered the case at the national level, halting construction temporarily. Standing Rock Sioux protesters at the site were joined by activists from hundreds of other Tribes and supporters, including indigenous peoples from South America. ICT published its first "single-subject, event-driven edition in [its] history" in October 2016, based on the reporting done and exploring the many complex issues related to the project and protests.

== Television and broadcasting ==
- On July 27, 2018, Indian Country Today began posting their Video News Report on YouTube, hosted by associate editor Vincent Schilling.
- On November 5, 2018, Indian Country Today teamed with First Nations Experience and Native Voice One in broadcasting and streaming the first national news report focused on Native American candidates from coast to coast. A team of 18 correspondents reported from sites across the United States, including Alaska and Hawaii. The election desk was anchored by Mark Trahant, editor of Indian Country Today.
- Indian Country Today began broadcasting in March 2020 a 30-minute news program titled ICT Newscast. It is now carried by PBS stations, presented by Arizona PBS, and produced in Studio A of the Walter Cronkite School of Journalism and Mass Communication at Arizona State University. The ICT Newscast was anchored from 2020 to November 1, 2021, by Patty Talahongva (Hopi), by Mark Trahant from November 2–3, 2021, and by Aliyah Chavez (Kewa Pueblo) since November 4, 2021.

== Awards ==
ICT has won numerous awards at the Native American Journalists Association. In 2014, the publication earned 17 awards, including Best Digital Publication for its 12-page digital newsletter and first place for General Excellence. In 2013, ICTMN won 11 awards at the conference.

== Notable writers, editors, contributors ==
Some current and former Indian Country Today staff writers and contributors include:

- Suzette Brewer (Cherokee Nation), former public affairs officer for the National Museum of the American Indian. She received recognition for her in-depth coverage of the "Baby Veronica" case and other stories related to the Indian Child Welfare Act (ICWA).
- Rob Capriccioso (Sault Ste. Marie Tribe of Chippewa) served as ICT's Washington, DC, bureau chief.
- Terri Crawford Hansen (Winnebago Tribe of Nebraska) is a science and environment journalist who has reported on the effects of climate breakdown and adaptation planning in Indian country for Indian Country Today since 2007
- Simon Moya-Smith (Oglala Lakota), former ICT culture editor
- Steven Newcomb (Shawnee/Lenape descent), co-founder and co-director of the Indigenous Law Institute in California
- Steve Russell (Cherokee Nation), associate professor emeritus of criminal justice at Indiana University Bloomington
- Mark Trahant (Shoshone-Bannock), founding editor of Indian Country Today on 2018 re-launch
- Larry Spotted Crow Mann (Nipmuc)
- Marty Two Bulls Sr. (Oglala Lakota), cartoonist and satirist

== See also ==
- Institute for Nonprofit News (ICT is a member)
