= National Native News =

- Running time: 5 minutes
- Country of origin: United States
- Language(s): English
- Syndicates: Native Voice One
- Starring: Antonia Gonzales
- Recording studio: Albuquerque, New Mexico
- Original release: 1987
- Website: www.nativenews.net

National Native News is a United States–based public radio headlines package service, currently owned by the Koahnic Broadcast Corporation. It produces and distributes a daily, 5-minute segment of stories and features pertaining to Native American and Canadian First Nations topics, which is used by public radio stations to supplement their locally-produced news programming. It is the only daily radio program in the United States focusing on Native American issues.

National Native News was established in 1987 with an initial funding grant from the Corporation for Public Broadcasting. It was originally distributed by the Alaska Public Radio Network (APRN), and its broadcast reach was limited to Alaska. In 1995 APRN turned over the program to the Koahnic Broadcast Corporation, and syndication began shortly thereafter, with programs distributed nationwide by the Public Radio Satellite System. The program moved its studios to Albuquerque, New Mexico in 2003.

National Native News is carried on more than 200 radio stations in the U.S. and Canada, including KUT, KHSU, KGOU, KNBA, KPFA and others. A portion of the program's broadcasts have been archived in the National Museum of the American Indian.
