= Rupert Costo =

Native American leader

- Born: 1906; Hemet, California, U.S.
- Died: October 20, 1989 (aged 82–83); San Francisco, California, U.S.
- Citizenship: Cahuilla Band of Indians and U.S.
- Education: Riverside City College, Whittier College, University of Nevada
- Occupations: Writer, activist, publisher, philanthropist, farmer, cattle rancher, surveyor, mineralogist, engineer
- Spouse: Jeannette Henry Costo

Rupert Costo (1906 – October 20, 1989) was a Cahuilla writer, activist, publisher, and philanthropist. He was a co-founder of the American Indian Historical Society (AIHS) and the Indian Historian Press publishing company. Costo had many careers and avocations throughout his life, including farmer, cattle rancher, surveyor, and mineralogist. He also served as an engineer for the California Division of Highways for nearly 20 years.

== Early life and education ==
Costo was born in Hemet, California, and was raised on the nearby Cahuilla Reservation.

He attended Riverside City College in the 1920s along with classmate John Gabbert, who ultimately became a Superior Court Judge. Following his time at Riverside Community College (now Riverside City College), he attended Whittier College and then the University of Nevada.

== Career ==
=== Soil conservation ===
Costo was key in the establishment of the Anza Soil Conservation District, now known as the Elsinore-Murrieta-Anza Resource Conservation District.

=== Native American advocacy ===
Costo served as a member of the governing board of Cahuilla Reservation for more than 20 years and its spokesman for 8 years. He also served as a lobbyist fighting for Native American land rights for two years in Washington, D.C. and was a member of the American Indian Federation in the late 1930s.

He co-founded the American Indian Historical Society in 1950, in an effort to ensure scholarly examination of Native American lives as opposed to the stereotypes so prevalent in United States' society at the time. As part of the same efforts, he and his wife, Jeannette Costo, founded the scholarly journal The Indian Historian as well as the popular press periodical Wassaja.

The Costos founded the Indian Historian Press, a for-profit publishing house dedicated to publishing titles documenting or related to the Native American experience in the United States. The Indian Historian Press published some 59 book titles.

Costo and his wife Jeannette opposed the efforts within the Catholic Church to name Father Junipero Serra a saint based on the claim that he treated Native Americans in an inhumane fashion.

=== University of California, Riverside advocacy ===
Rupert Costo and his lifelong friend, Superior Court Judge John Gabbert, were key players in lobbying the University of California to establish a university in Riverside, California.

== Personal life ==
Rupert Costo was married to Jeannette Henry Costo (1908–2001), a reporter for The New York Times, the Detroit Free Press, and The Plain Dealer, in 1954. Mrs. Costo identified as being of Eastern Cherokee descent and was an activist for Native American causes in her own right.

Costo was named the Riverside Community College Alumni of the Year.

== Death and legacy ==
Rupert Costo died on October 20, 1989, at his home in San Francisco, California.

The Costo's extensive personal library documenting the Native American experience in the United States was donated to the University of California Riverside Libraries in May 1986. The Costo Chair in American Indian History at the University of California, Riverside, was named in his honor.

== Publications ==
- Textbooks and the American Indian (1970)
- Indian Voices: the Native American Today (1974)
- Indian Treaties: Two Centuries of Dishonor (1977)
- A Thousand Years of American Indian Storytelling (1981)
- Costo, Rupert; Henry Costo, Jeannette (1987). The Missions of California: A Legacy of Genocide. The Indian Historian Press. ISBN 9780317645392.
- Costo, Rupert; Henry Costo, Jeannette (1995). Natives of the Golden State: The California Indians. The Indian Historian Press. ISBN 9780713436266.

== Bibliography ==
- Erickson, Jan. Transcription of an Oral History Interview with Jeannette Costo, University of California, Riverside, July 27, 1998. Retrieved November 23, 2013
- Starr, Raymond. "The Missions of California: A Legacy of Genocide. Book Review." The Journal of San Diego History, Volume 35, Number 3, Summer 1989. Retrieved 1989
