= High Country News =

American magazine

- Editor-in-chief: Jennifer Sahn
- Former editors: Brian Calvert
- Frequency: Monthly
- Circulation: 36,000
- Publisher: Greg Hanscom
- Founded: 1970
- Country: United States
- Based in: Paonia, Colorado
- Website: hcn.org
- ISSN: 0191-5657

High Country News is a monthly independent magazine based in Paonia, Colorado, that covers environmental, social, and political issues in the Western United States. Syndicated stories from High Country News have appeared in The New York Times, The Atlantic, Rolling Stone, and other national publications. The non-profit High Country News media organization also produces a website, special reports, and books.

Tom Bell, a Wyoming conservationist, rancher, and decorated World War II bombardier, started a newspaper in 1970 that would become the High Country News. He died at the age of 92 in 2016 in Lander, Wyoming, where he had founded High Country News.

In 2017, High Country News became the first non-Native American publication to establish an Indigenous Affairs desk as part of an effort to attract new readers and improve their coverage of Native American issues.

== Funding ==
High Country News has more than 35,000 subscribers. In 2017, it received approximately 43% of its income from donations, 29% from subscriptions, 5% from advertising, and the balance from syndication and other sources.

== Recognition ==
According to a review in The Christian Science Monitor, the paper "is closely read in congressional offices and state houses, as well as in the government agencies that control most of the rural West. It has broken important stories subsequently picked up by The New York Times and other national media." Former Arizona Governor Bruce Babbitt described the paper as "the only place where you can really know what's happening in the rest of the West."

High Country News has received numerous journalism and environmental awards, including (but not limited to):

- 2020 George Polk Award for Education Reporting for "Land Grab Universities" by Tristan Ahtone and Robert Lee
- 2018 James Beard Foundation Journalism Awards, Foodways category, for "The Teenage Whaler's Tale" by Julia O'Malley
- 2013 Utne Reader magazine's Utne Media Award for Best Environmental Coverage
- 2013 National Association of Science Writers Science in Society Journalism Award, Science Reporting for a Local or Regional Audience category for "The Color of Bunny" by Hillary Rosner
- 2012 Knight-Risser Prize for Western Environmental Journalism for "Perilous Passages" by Emilene Ostlind and Joe Riis
- 2012 National Association of Science Writers Science in Society Journalism Award, Science Reporting for a Local or Regional Audience category, for "Perilous Passages" by Emilene Ostlind, Mary Ellen Hannibal, and Cally Carswell
- 2012 Society of Environmental Journalists Awards, Outstanding Beat Reporting, Small Market
- 2011 Excellence in Journalism Awards from the Native American Journalists Association
- 2010 Native American Journalists Association Best Environmental Story of 2010 (monthly/bimonthly category)
- 2010 Utne Reader magazine's Utne Independent Press Award for Environmental Coverage
- 2010 Hillman Prize for Magazine Journalism for "The Dark Side of Dairies" by Rebecca Clarren
- 2009 Society of Environmental Journalists Awards, Outstanding Small Market Reporting, Print category
- 2008 Hillman Prize for Magazine Journalism
- 2006 George Polk Award for Political Reporting for "Death in the Energy Fields" by Ray Ring

== See also ==
- Institute for Nonprofit News (member)
