= List of Indigenous writers of the Americas =

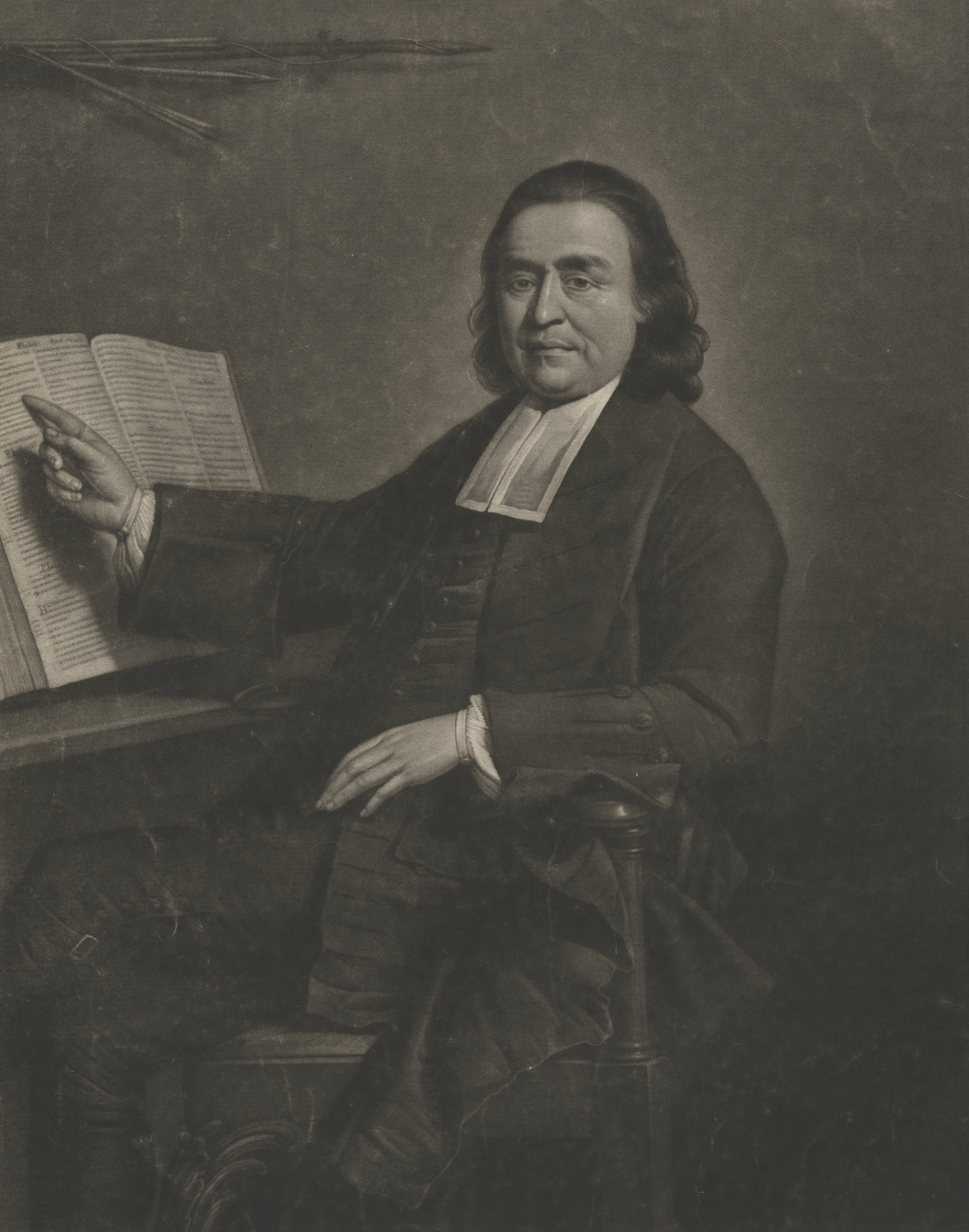
The Reverend Samson Occom, a Mohegan writer thought to be the first Native American to publish in English

This is a list of notable writers who are Indigenous peoples of the Americas.

This list includes authors who are Alaskan Native, American Indian, First Nations, Inuit, Métis, and Indigenous peoples of Mexico, the Caribbean, Central America, and South America, as defined by the citizens of these Indigenous nations and tribes.

While Indigenous identity can at times be complex, inclusion in this list is based upon reliably-sourced citizenship in an Indigenous nation, based upon the legal definitions of, and recognition by, the relevant Indigenous community claimed by the individual. They must be documented as being claimed by that community. Writers such as Forrest Carter, Ward Churchill, Jamake Highwater, Joseph Boyden and Grey Owl, whose claims of Indigenous American descent have been factually disproved through genealogical research, are not included in this list.

== A ==
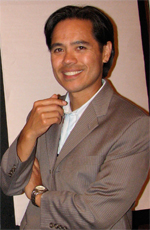
Evan Adams, Tla'amin First Nation Coast Salish, Canada

- Louise Abeita, Isleta Pueblo, 1926–2014
- Janice Acoose, Sakimay (Saulteaux) First Nation-Métis, Canada, 1954–2020
- Evan Adams, Tla'amin Nation Coast Salish, Canada, b. 1966
- Howard Adams, Métis, Canada, 1921–2001
- Freda Ahenakew, Ahtahkakoop Cree, Canada, 1932–2011
- Humberto Ak'ab'al, K'iche' Maya, Guatemala, 1952–2019
- Kateri Akiwenzie-Damm, Nawash Chippewa, Canada, b. 1965
- Clarence Alexander, Gwichyaa Zhee Corporation Gwich’in, b. 1939
- Robert Arthur Alexie, Gwich'in, Canada, 1957–2014
- Sherman Alexie, Spokane/Coeur d'Alene, b. 1966
- Gerald Taiaiake Alfred, Kahnawake Mohawk, Canada, b. 1964
- Elsie Allen, Cloverdale Pomo, 1899–1990
- Minerva Allen, Assiniboine, 1934–2024
- Paula Gunn Allen, Laguna Pueblo descent, 1939–2008
- Fernando de Alva Cortés Ixtlilxochitl, Texcocan, Mexico, ca. 1570–1648
- Irma Alvarez Ccoscco, Quechua, Peru, b. 1980
- Arthur Amiotte, Oglala Lakota, b. 1942
- Ch'aska Anka Ninawaman, Quechua, Peru, b. 1973
- William Apess, Pequot, 1798–1839
- Annette Arkeketa, Otoe-Missouria/Muscogee
- Jeannette C. Armstrong, Penticton Indian Band (Okanagan), Canada, b. 1948
- José María Arguedas, Mestizo of Quechua-descent, Peru, 1911–1969
- Joan Tavares Avant, Mashpee Wampanoag, b. 1940

== B ==
- Joséphine Bacon, Innu, Québec, Canada, b.1947
- Marie Annharte Baker, Little Saskatchewan Ojibway, Canada, b. 1942
- Dennis Banks, Leech Lake Ojibwe, 1937–2017
- Keith Barker, Métis, Canada
- Jim Barnes, Choctaw Nation descent, b. 1933, Poet Laureate of Oklahoma, 2009
- James Bartleman, Chippewas of Rama First Nation, Canada, b. 1939
- Tara Beagan, Nlakaʼpamux, Canada
- Glecia Bear, Cree, Canada, 1912–1998
- Shane Belcourt, Métis, Canada, b. 1972
- Diane E. Benson, Tlingit, b. 1954
- Gertrude Bernard (Anahareo), Mohawk, Canada, 1906–1986
- Brandi Bird, Saulteaux/Cree/Métis, Canada
- Gloria Bird, Spokane, b. 1951
- Sandra Birdsell, Métis, Canada, b. 1942
- Andrew Blackbird, Odawa, ca. 1815–1908
- Ned Blackhawk, Te-Moak Shoshone
- Governor Blacksnake (Thaonawyuthe/Chainbreaker), Seneca, c. 1760–1859
- Peter Blue Cloud, Mohawk, 1935–2011
- Buffalo Bird Woman (Maxidiwiac), Hidatsa, ca. 1839–1932
- Sherwin Bitsui, Navajo, b. 1975
- Kimberly M. Blaeser, White Earth Ojibwe, b. 1955
- Peter Blue Cloud, Mohawk, b. 1935
- Selina Boan, Cree, Canada
- Columpa Bobb, Tsleil Waututh/Nlaka'pamux, Canada, b. 1971
- Elias Boudinot, Cherokee, 1740–1821, first Native American novelist (Poor Sarah, 1823)
- Beth Brant, Bay of Quinte Mohawk, 1941–2015
- Mary Brave Bird, Sicangu Lakota, 1953–2013
- Ignatia Broker, Ottertail Pillager Band Ojibwe, United States, 1919–1987
- Emily Ticasuk Ivanoff Brown, Inuk, (1904–1982)
- Vee F. Browne, Navajo, b. 1956
- Joseph Bruchac, Nulhegan Band, b. 1942
- Louis F. Burns (Hulah Hihekah), Osage Nation, 1920–2012
- Frank Christopher Busch, Cree, Canada
- Jodi Byrd, Chickasaw Nation, United States

== C ==
- Cody Caetano, Pinaymootang Ojibway
- Gregory Cajete, Santa Clara Pueblo
- Cristina Calderón, Yaghan, Chile, 1928–2022, last speaker of the Yaghan language
- Victoria Belcourt Callihoo, 1861–1966, Métis historian
- Adela Calva Reyes, Otomí, Mexico, 1967–2018
- Maria Campbell, Métis, Canada, b. 1940
- Nicola Campbell, Interior Salish Nleʔkepmx, Canada
- Rob Capriccioso, Sault Ste. Marie Chippewa
- Cliff Cardinal, Cree/Lakota
- Harold Cardinal, Cree, 1945–2005
- Pedro Cayuqueo, Mapuche, Chile, b. 1975
- Aaron Albert Carr, Laguna Pueblo/Navajo, b. 1963
- Marisol Ceh Moo, Maya, Mexico, b. 1968
- Betsey Guppy Chamberlain, Wabanaki, ca. 1797–1886
- Dean Chavers, Lumbee, b. 1942
- Shirley Cheechoo, Cree, Canada, b. 1952
- Elicura Chihuailaf Nahuelpán, Mapuche, Chile
- Eddie Chuculate, Muscogee (Creek) Nation/Cherokee, b. 1978
- Marie Clements, Métis, Canada, b. 1962
- Susan Clements, Seneca/Mohawk-descent, United States, b. 1950
- George Clutesi, Tseshaht First Nation, Canada, 1905–1988
- Jacinto Collahuazo, Quechua, Ecuador
- Thomas Commuck, Narragansett, 1805–1855
- Robert J. Conley, Cherokee Nation, 1940–2014
- Pascual Coña, Mapuche, Chile, late 1840s–1927
- Ivonne Coñuecar, Mapuche, Chile, b. 1980
- Elizabeth Cook-Lynn, Crow Creek Lakota, b. 1930
- Linda Coombs, Aquinnah Wampanoag
- George Copway, Mississauga Ojibwa, Canada, 1818–1869
- Jesse Cornplanter, Seneca, 1889–1957
- Rupert Costo, Cahuilla, 1906–1989
- Caleigh Crow, Métis, Canada
- Leonard Crow Dog, Oglala Lakota, 1942–2021
- Briceida Cuevas, Maya, Mexico, b. 1969
- David Cusick, Seneca, ca. 1780–ca. 1831

== D ==
- Joseph A. Dandurand, Kwantlen First Nation, Canada
- Jenny L. Davis, Chickasaw Nation, United States
- Nora Marks Dauenhauer, Tlingit, 1927–2017
- Garcilaso de la Vega, 1539–1616, Mestizo/Quechua descent, Peru
- Nora Thompson Dean, Touching Leaves Woman, Delaware Tribe of Indians, 1907–1984
- Philip J. Deloria, Standing Rock Sioux Tribe
- Ella Cara Deloria, Yankton Dakota/Standing Rock Sioux, 1889–1971
- Vine Deloria, Jr., Yankton Dakota/Standing Rock Sioux, 1933–2005
- Bonnie Devine, Serpent River First Nation, Canada
- Cherie Dimaline, Métis, Canada
- Edward Dozier, Santa Clara Pueblo, 1916–1971
- Dawn Dumont, Okanese First Nation, Canada, b. 1973/1974
- Yves Sioui Durand, Huron-Wendat Nation, Canada, b. 1951

== E ==
- Charles Eastman (Hakadah, Ohiyesa), Santee Dakota, 1858–1939
- Kyle Edwards, Anishinaabe, Canada
- Tommy Enuaraq, Inuk, Canada
- Heid E. Erdrich, Turtle Mountain Ojibwe, b. 1963
- Louise Erdrich, Turtle Mountain Ojibwe, b. 1954

== F ==
- Stephanie Fielding, Mohegan
- Connie Fife, Cree
- Waawaate Fobister, Grassy Meadows First Nation, Canada
- Naomi Fontaine, Innu, Canada
- Natasha Kanapé Fontaine, Innu, Canada
- Lee Francis III, Laguna Pueblo descent, 1945–2003
- Vera Francis, Passamaquoddy, b. 1958
- Mini Aodla Freeman, Inuk, Canada, b. 1936
- Alice Masak French, Inuk, Canada, 1930–2013

== G ==
- Eric Gansworth, Onondaga
- Garcilaso de la Vega (El Inca), Quechua, Peru, 1539–1616, first published in 1609
- Andrew George, Jr., Wet'suwet'en First Nation, Canada, b. 1963
- Rueben George, Coast Salish, Canada
- Janice Gould, Maidu/Koyangk'auwi, 1949–2019
- George R. D. Goulet, Métis, Canada, b. 1933
- Fred Grove, Osage Nation/Oglala Lakota, 1913–2008
- Felipe Guaman Poma de Ayala, Quechua, Peru, ca. 1535–after 1616

== H ==
- Janet Campbell Hale, Coeur d'Alene-Kootenay, 1946–2021
- Terri Crawford Hansen, Winnebago Tribe of Nebraska, b. 1953
- Ann Meekitjuk Hanson, Inuk, Canada, b. 1946
- Joy Harjo, Mvskoke, b. 1951
- Suzan Shown Harjo, Mvskoke/Southern Cheyenne
- LaDonna Harris, Comanche
- Ernestine Hayes, Tlingit, b. 1945
- Dakota Ray Hebert, Dene
- James (Sakej) Youngblood Henderson, Chickasaw/Cheyenne, b. 1944
- Gordon Henry, White Earth Ojibwe, b. 1955
- Natalio Hernández, Nahua, Mexico, b. 1947
- Hen-Toh (Bertrand N. O. Walker), Wyandotte, 1870–1927
- Vi Hilbert, Upper Skagit, 1918–2008
- Carol Anne Hilton Hesquiaht/Nuu-chah-nulth, Canada
- Tomson Highway, Cree, Canada, b. 1951
- Linda Hogan, Chickasaw Nation, b. 1947
- Andrew Hope III, Tlingit, 1949–2008
- John Christian Hopkins, Narragansett, b. 1960
- George Horse-Capture, Gros Ventre, 1937–2013
- Robert Houle, Saulteaux, Canada, b. 1947
- LeAnne Howe, Choctaw Nation of Oklahoma, b. 1951
- Ralph Hubbard, Seneca, 1885–1980
- Graciela Huinao, Huilliche, Chile, b. 1956
- Beverly Hungry Wolf, Blackfoot Confederacy, Canada, b. 1950
- Al Hunter, Rainy River Ojibwe, Canada

== I ==
- Alootook Ipellie, Inuk, Canada, 1951–2007
- Peter Irniq, Inuk, Canada, b. 1947
- Madeline Ivalu, Inuk, Canada

== J ==
- Michel Jean, Innu, Québec, Canada
- Paulla Dove Jennings, Narragansett
- Rita Joe, Mi'kmaq, Canada, 1932–2007
- Jessica Johns, Cree, Canada
- Emily Pauline Johnson (Tekahionwake), Mohawk, Canada, 1861–1913
- Aviaq Johnston, Inuk, Canada
- Basil H. Johnston, Wasauksing Ojibway, Canada, 1929–2015
- Stephen Graham Jones, Blackfeet Tribe, b. 1972
- William Jones, Sac and Fox Nation, 1871–1909
- Edith Josie, Gwich'in, Canada, 1921–2010
- Hugo Jamioy Juagibioy, Kamentsa, Colombia
- Betty Mae Tiger Jumper, Seminole Tribe of Florida, April 27, 1923 – January 14, 2011
- Daniel Heath Justice, Cherokee Nation, Canada

== K ==
- Joseph Kakwinokanasum, Cree
- Peter Kalifornsky, Dena'ina, 1911–1993
- Joan Kane, Iñupiaq
- Margo Kane, Cree/Saulteaux, Canada, b. 1951
- An Antane-Kapesh, Innu, Québec, Canada, 1926–2004
- Jacqueline Keeler, Navajo Nation citizen / Yankton Dakota descent
- Maude Kegg, Mille Lacs Ojibwe, 1904–1999
- William Kennedy, Métis, Canada, 1814–1890
- Maurice Kenny, Mohawk, 1929–2016
- Robin Wall Kimmerer, Citizen Potawatomi Nation, b. 1953
- Jules Arita Koostachin, Cree, Canada
- Michael Kusugak, Inuk, Canada, b. 1948
- J. D. Kurtness, Innu, Québec, Canada, b. 1981

== L ==
- Francis La Flesche, Omaha/Ponca, 1857–1932
- Susette La Flesche, Omaha/Ponca, 1854–1903
- Carole Labarre, Innu, b. 1966
- Winona LaDuke, White Earth Ojibwe, b. 1959
- Carole LaFavor, Ojibwe
- Joseph Laurent, Abenaki, 1839–1917
- David Gene Lewis, Confederated Tribes of Grand Ronde, b. 1965
- Ronald G. Lewis, Cherokee Nation, b. 1941
- Georgina Lightning, Sampson First Nation Cree, Canada
- Darcie Little Badger, Lipan Apache, b. 1987
- William Harjo LoneFight, Muscogee/Natchez, b. 1966
- Donna M. Loring, Penobscot, b. 1948
- Kevin Loring, Nlaka'pamux, Canada Canada
- Adrian C. Louis, Lovelock Paiute, 1946–2018
- Phil Lucas, Choctaw Nation of Oklahoma, 1942–2007
- Henrik Lund, Kalaaleq, Greenland, 1875–1948

== M ==
- Matthew MacKenzie, Cree/Ojibwe/Métis, Canada
- Terese Marie Mailhot, Nlaka'pamux, Canada
- Wilma Mankiller, Cherokee Nation, 1945–2010
- Larry Spotted Crow Mann, Nipmuc
- Vera Manuel, Secwepemc, Canada/Ktunaxa, 1949–2010
- Lee Maracle, Salish/Cree, Canada, 1950–2021
- Joseph M. Marshall III, Brulé Lakota, b. ca. 1946
- Henry Lorne Masta, Abenaki, 1853–unknown
- John Joseph Mathews, Osage, ca. 1894–1979
- Ed McGaa, Oglala, 1936–2017
- Gerald McMaster, Siksika Nation/Red Pheasant First Nation, Canada, b. 1953
- William D'Arcy McNickle, Salish Kootenai, 1904–1977
- Joe Medicine Crow, Crow, 1913–2016
- Rigoberta Menchú, K'iché Maya, Guatemala, b. 1959
- Billy Merasty, Cree, Canada, b. 1960
- Edmund Metatawabin, Cree, Canada
- Tiffany Midge, Hunkpapa Lakota, b. 1965
- Devon Mihesuah, Choctaw Nation, b. 1957
- Deborah A. Miranda, Esselen/Chumash descent
- Gabriela Mistral, Diaguita, Chile, 1889–1957
- Lewis Mitchell, Passamaquoddy, 1847–1930
- Ruby E. Modesto (Torres Martinez Desert Cahuilla, 1913–1980
- N. Scott Momaday, Kiowa Tribe, 1934–2024
- Carlos Montezuma, Yavapai, 1866–1923
- Patricia Monture-Angus, Grand River Mohawk, Canada
- Irvin Morris, Navajo, b. 1958
- Daniel David Moses, Delaware descent, Canada, 1952–2020
- Mountain Wolf Woman, Ho-Chunk, 1884–1960
- Mourning Dove, Colville/Okanagan, 1888–1936
- Daniel Munduruku, Munduruku, Brazil, b. 1964
- Neddiel Muñoz Millalonco, Mapuche, Chile
- James Rolfe Murie (Skiri Pawnee, 1862–1921)

== N ==
- Mitiarjuk Nappaaluk, Inuk, Canada
- Nora Naranjo Morse, Santa Clara Pueblo, b. 1953
- David Neel, Kwakwaka'wakw, Canada, b. 1960
- Duane Niatum, Klallam, b. 1938
- Mildred Noble, Naotkamegwanning Ojibway, Canada and United States, 1921–2008
- Jim Northrup (Chibenashi), Fond du Lac Ojibwe, United States, 1943–2016
- nila northSun, Shoshone/Red Lake Ojibwe, b. 1951

== O ==
- Jean O'Brien, White Earth Ojibwe, b. 1958
- Samson Occom, Mohegan, 1723–1792, the first Native American known to publish in English
- Louis Oliver (Little Coon or Wotkoce Okisce), 1904–1991, Muscogee, poet
- Orpingalik, Netsilik Inuk, Canada
- Simon J. Ortiz, Acoma Pueblo, b. 1941

== P ==
- Aaron Paquette, Métis, Canada
- Arthur C. Parker, Seneca, 1881–1955
- Daniel N. Paul, Mi'kmaq, Canada, b. 1938
- Mihku Paul, Kingsclear First Nation Maliseet, Canada, b. 1958
- Elise Paschen, Osage Nation
- Markoosie Patsauq, Inuk, Canada
- William S. Penn, Nez Perce, b. 1949
- Robert L. Perea, Oglala Lakota/Mexican
- Amanda Peters, Mi'kmaq
- Paula Peters, Wampanoag
- Lawrence "Pun" Plamondon", Grand Traverse Odawa-Ojibwe, b. 1946
- Peter Pitseolak, Cape Dorset Inuk, Canada, 1902–1973
- Simon Pokagon, Pokagon Potawatomi, ca. 1830–1899
- Michelle Porter, Métis
- Marie Mason Potts, Mountain Maidu, United States, 1895–1978
- Alexander Posey, Muscogee (Creek) Nation, 1873–1908
- Susan Power, Standing Rock Sioux, b. 1961
- Pretty-Shield, Crow Nation, 1856–1944

== Q ==
- Rachel Qitsualik-Tinsley, Inuk, Canada
- Quesalid, Kwakwaka'wakw, Canada
- Taamusi Qumaq, Inuk, Canada, 1914–1993

== R ==
- Anselmo Raguileo Lincopil, Mapuche, Chile, 1922–1992
- Avis Red Bear, Sioux journalist
- Chief Henry Red Eagle, (Henry Perley), Maliseet, 1885–1972
- Delphine Red Shirt, Oglala Lakota, b. 1957
- Duke Redbird, Saugeen Ojibwe, Canada, b. 1939
- Bill Reid, Haida, Canada, 1920–1998
- Carter Revard, Osage Nation, 1931–2022
- Lawney Reyes, Confederated Colville Tribes (Sinixt), b. 1951
- Waubgeshig Rice, Wasauksing Ojibwe, Canada
- Emily Riddle, Cree, Canada
- John Rollin Ridge (Yellow Bird), Cherokee, 1827–1867
- Lynn Riggs, Cherokee, United States, 1899–1954
- Silvia Rivera Cusicanqui, Aymara, Bolivia, b. 1949
- David A. Robertson, Cree, Canada, b. 1977
- Eden Robinson, Haisla/Heiltsuk, Canada, b. 1968
- Henry Roe Cloud, Winnebago Tribe of Nebraska, 1884–1950
- January Rogers, Six Nations Tuscarora/Mohawk
- Will Rogers, Cherokee Nation, 1879–1935
- Will Rogers, Jr., Cherokee Nation, 1911–1993
- Wendy Rose, Hopi/Miwok, b. 1948
- Ian Ross, Métis, Canada, b. 1960
- Armand Garnet Ruffo, Chapleau Ojibwe, Canada, b. 1955
- Steve Russell, Cherokee Nation, 1947–2021

== S ==
- Ray St. Germain, Métis, Canada
- Carol Lee Sanchez, Laguna Pueblo descent
- William Sanders, Cherokee Nation, 1942–2017
- Greg Sarris, Federated Indians of Graton Rancheria, b. 1952
- Madeline Sayet, Mohegan, b. 1989
- Katherine Siva Saubel, Los Coyotes Cahuilla, 1920–2011
- Gregory Scofield, Métis, Canada, b. 1966
- Jane Johnston Schoolcraft, Sault Ste. Marie Ojibwe, 1800–1841, first Native woman to publish
- Bev Sellars, Xat'sull, Canada
- James Sewid, Kwakwaka'wakw, Canada, 1913–1988
- María Clara Sharupi Jua, Shuar, Ecuador, b. 1964
- Charles Norman Shay, Penobscot, 1924–2025
- Paula Sherman, Ardoch Algonquin First Nation, Canada
- Kim Shuck, Cherokee Nation
- Angela Sidney, Tagish, Canada, 1902–1991
- Leslie Marmon Silko, Laguna Pueblo descent, b. 1948
- Leanne Betasamosake Simpson, Alderville First Nation, Canada
- Niigaan Sinclair, Anishinaabe, Canada
- Ruby Slipperjack, Eabametoong Ojibwe, Canada, b. 1952
- Cynthia Leitich Smith, Muscogee Creek, b. 1967
- Monique Gray Smith, Cree/Lakota, Canada
- Paul Chaat Smith, Comanche/Choctaw
- Virginia Driving Hawk Sneve, Brulé Lakota, b. 1933
- Donald Soctomah, Passamaquoddy
- Loren Spears, Narragansett
- Luther Standing Bear, Oglala Lakota, ca. 1868–1939
- Angela Sterritt, Gitxsan, Canada
- James Thomas Stevens, Akwesasne Mohawk, b. 1966
- Virginia Stroud, United Keetoowah Band Cherokee/Muscogee, b. 1951
- Madonna Swan, Cheyenne River Lakota, 1928–1993
- Denise Sweet, White Earth Ojibwe, Poet Laureate of Wisconsin 2004
- James Schoppert, Tlingit, 1947–1992

== T ==
- Gladys Tantaquidgeon, Mohegan, 1899–2005
- Luci Tapahonso, Navajo, b. 1953
- Drew Hayden Taylor, Ojibwe, Canada, b. 1962
- Ningeokuluk Teevee, Cape Dorset Inuk, Canada, b. 1963
- Clayton Thomas-Müller, Cree, Canada
- Lucy Thompson, Yurok 1853–1932, first Indigenous Californian woman to be published
- Russell Thornton, Cherokee Nation, b. 1942
- Shannon Thunderbird, Tsimshian First Nation, Canada
- Susette LaFlesche Tibbles, Omaha/Ponca/Iowa, 1854–1903
- George Tinker, Osage Nation
- Natalia Toledo, Zapotec, Mexico, b. 1968
- Raymond D. Tremblay, Métis, Canada
- David Treuer, Leech Lake Ojibwe, b. 1970
- John Trudell, Santee Dakota, 1946–2015
- Demetrio Túpac Yupanqui, Quechua, Peru, 1923–2018
- Mark Turcotte, Turtle Mountain Chippewa
- Richard Twiss, Brulé Lakota, 1954–2013
- Arielle Twist, Cree
- E. Donald Two-Rivers, Rainy River Ojibwa, 1945–2008
- Froyla Tzalam, Mopan Maya, Belize

== U ==
- Uvavnuk, Iglulik Inuk, Canada

== V ==
- Richard Van Camp, Tli Cho, Canada, b. 1971
- Gerald Vizenor, White Earth Ojibwe, b. 1934

== W ==
- Richard Wagamese, Ojibwe, Canada
- Bertrand N. O. Walker (Hen-Toh), Wyandotte, 1870–1927
- Velma Wallis, Athabaskan, b. 1960
- Juan Wallparrimachi, Quechua, Bolivia, 1793–1814
- Anna Lee Walters, Pawnee/Otoe-Missouria, b. 1946
- William Whipple Warren, Ojibwe, 1825–1853
- Clyde Warrior, Ponca, 1939–1968
- Waziyatawin (Angela Wilson), Wahpetunwan Dakota
- Matthew James Weigel, Denesuline/Métis
- James Welch, Blackfeet/Gros Ventre, 1940–2003
- Gwen Westerman, Sisseton-Wahpeton Dakota Oyate /Cherokee Nation
- Tom Whitecloud, Lac du Flambeau Ojibwe, 1914–1972
- Mary Louise Defender Wilson, Dakota/Hidatsa, b. 1930
- Sarah Winnemucca (Thocmentony), Northern Paiute, ca. 1844–1891
- Elizabeth Woody, Navajo/Wasco-Wishram, b. 1957
- Muriel Hazel Wright, Choctaw Nation, 1889–1975

== Y ==
- William S. Yellow Robe, Jr., Fort Peck Assiniboine, 1962–2021
- Annie York, Spuzzum First Nation Nlaka'pamux, Canada, 1904–1991
- Blair Palmer Yoxall, Métis
- Ray Young Bear, Meskwaki, b. 1950
- Alfred Young Man, Chippewa-Cree, Canada and United States, b. 1948

== Z ==
- Leckott Zamora, Wichi, b. 1948
- Ofelia Zepeda, Tohono O'odham, b. 1952
- Zitkala-Sa (Gertrude Simmons Bonnin), Yankton Dakota-Standing Rock Sioux, 1876–1938
- Melissa Tantaquidgeon Zobel, Mohegan, b. 1960

== See also ==
- Category:Indigenous Australian writers
- Category:Native American writers
- Before Columbus Foundation
- List of 20th-century writers
- List of Indigenous artists of the Americas
- Multi-Ethnic Literature of the United States
- Native American Renaissance
- Native Americans in children's literature
- Native Writers' Circle of the Americas
- Navajo Community College Press
