= Louise Abeita =

American poet

- Born: September 9, 1926; Isleta Pueblo, New Mexico, U.S.
- Died: July 21, 2014 (aged 87); Albuquerque, New Mexico, U.S.
- Occupations: Author; poet; educator
- Known for: Author of I Am a Pueblo Indian Girl

Louise Abeita Chewiwi (E-Yeh-Shure or Blue Corn; September 9, 1926 – July 21, 2014) was a Pueblo writer, poet and educator who was an enrolled member of Isleta Pueblo.

== Early life ==
Louise Abeita was born and raised at Isleta Pueblo, New Mexico, USA. Her father, Diego Abeita, was active in tribal government. Her mother, Lottie Gunn Abeita, was from Laguna Pueblo.

== I Am a Pueblo Indian Girl ==
To his daughter's poems, Diego brought together artists from Navajo, Apache and Pueblo communities to print a book based on them. This group formed the National Gallery of the American Indian (NGAI), and published Abeita's illustrated book. She was 13 years old at the time. I Am a Pueblo Indian Girl (1939) has been described as the "first truly Indian book" by historians Gretchen Bataille and Laurie Lisa.

The book depicts the life of Abeita through prose and poetry. Themes throughout the book touch on Pueblo traditions, with illustrations by artists from NGAI complimenting her writing. This book is considered to be the first effort in the Pueblo community to document their own art and culture for non-Native viewers.

She appeared in the 1940 film short Fashion Horizons, showing her book to Hollywood stars.

== See also ==
- List of writers from peoples indigenous to the Americas
- Native American Studies
