= Carol Anne Hilton =

Hesquiaht author and economist

Carol Anne Hilton is a Vancouver-based Hesquiaht author with roots in the Ahousaht and Makah Nations. She is the CEO and founder of the Indigenomics movement. She wrote Indigenomics: Taking a Seat at the Economic Table. Hilton is the CEO of The Indigenomics Institute, the Global Centre of Indigenomics and most recently the Global Indigenous Technology House. Carol Anne also launched the first 24-hour online global Indigenous economy forum called Indigenomics NOW which serves to align economy and natural law.

== Early life and education ==
Hilton is Nuu-chah-nulth of the Hesquiaht nation on Vancouver Island.

She obtained her international master's in business administration from the UK's Hertfordshire University in 2004.

== Career ==
Hilton is an international Indigenous business leader and award-winning author of Indigenomics: Taking a Seat at the Economic Table which was shortlisted for a Donner Prize in 2022. The title of the book comes from the #Indigenomics hashtag that she coined on Twitter in 2012. The book builds visibility of Indigenous economic worldview and addresses the common rhetoric and perception of Indigenous peoples and critiques the "economic displacement" of Indigenous People. Kevin Carmichael writing in the Financial Post calls it a "manifesto" and "revelatory", noting how it "forces non-Indigenous readers to confront the systematic exclusion of founding peoples from the country's economic life." Carmichael comparers her writing that of Zambian economist Dambisa Moyo. It was published by New Society Publishers.

Hilton is the founder and the CEO of The Indigenomics Institute and founder of the Global Centre of Indigenomics. She is also host of the global Indigenomics NOW forum which uplifts Indigenous economic worldview and shapes a narrative of economics in alignment with natural law and with Life At The Center.

Carol Anne serves as a Director on the McGill University Institute for the Study of Canada, Earth Charter International, the Value Commission, She previously served on the Canadian Federal Economic Growth Council, as a co-chair of the Canadian Chamber of Commerce BIPOC National Advisory, MITACS Research, the BC Emerging Economy Taskforce, the BC Digital Supercluster amongst other roles. She was also faculty at Simon Fraser University's Community Economic Development Program and the faculty lead at the Banff Center's Indigenous Business Program.

== Personal life ==
Hilton lives in Victoria, British Columbia.

== See also ==
- Indigenous peoples in Canada
