= Linda Coombs =

American historian

Linda Jeffers Coombs is an author and historian from the Wampanoag Tribe of Gay Head (Aquinnah). Coombs is the former program director of the Aquinnah Cultural Center.

== Career ==
Coombs began a museum career in 1974, interning at the Boston Children's Museum as part of its Native American Program. She and her peers, including Narragansett elder Paulla Dove Jennings, wrote children's books for the museum, illustrating Native American culture from a Native American perspective. Coombs later worked for nearly three decades with the Wampanoag Indigenous Program at Plimoth Plantation, including 15 years as the program's associate director. In that capacity, she wrote a number of essays documenting colonial history from a Native American perspective, and often spoke publicly about the need for more accurate representations of colonial events including the first Thanksgiving and Columbus Day.

Coombs serves as program director of the Aquinnah Cultural Center, continuing to educate the public about Wampanoag history, culture, and other contributions. Valued for her expertise in regional Native American history, Coombs is a frequent consultant on scholarly and educational projects.

Born and raised in Martha's Vineyard, Coombs lives with her family in the Wampanoag Community in Mashpee on Cape Cod.

Coomb's work has been the subject of multiple book banning efforts in various school districts. In 2024, her book "Colonization and the Wampanoag Story" was challenged by an anonymous person and was subsequently moved from the non-fiction section to the fiction section of all Montgomery County public libraries.

== Publications ==
- "Colonization and the Wampanoag Story."Race to the Truth Series Crown Books for Young Readers, New York, 2023
- "A Wampanoag Perspective on Colonial House."Plimoth Life, v.3 no. 1, 2004: 24-28.
- "Hobbamock’s Homesite." Thanks, But No Thanks: Mirroring the Myth: Native Perspectives on Thanksgiving. Plymouth, MA: Wampanoag Indian Program. September 9, 2000: 2-3.
- "Holistic History." Plimoth Life 1(2) 2002:12-15.
- "Mayflower: A Story of Courage, Community and War by Nathaniel Philbrick [review]." " Cultural Survival Quarterly, Spring 2007.
- "New Woodland Path Makes Inroads at Wampanoag Homesite." Plimoth Life, v. 5 no. 1, 2006: 20.
- Powwow. Modern Curriculum Press, 1992.
- "Wampanoag Foodways in the 17th Century." Plimoth Life 2005: 13-19
