= Ch'aska Anka Ninawaman =

Peruvian writer

- Born: 1973 (age 52–53); Chisikata, Espinar Province, Peru
- Occupations: poet, translator and lecturer of literature
- Writing career
- Language: Quechua, Spanish
- Genre: poetry

Ch'aska Anka Ninawaman (born Eugenia Carlos Ríos in Chisikata, Espinar Province, Peru) is a Quechua-language poet, translator and lecturer of literature.

== Early life and education ==
Ch'aska Anka Ninawaman was born in the Quechua community of Chisikata in Espinar Province in the Department of Cuzco. At the age of six years, she moved to Yauri, and when she was seven, she had to move to Arequipa to work as a housemaid. At the age of 15 she returned to her hometown to study at the town's school.

As a young student, Ch'aska Anka Ninawaman changed her name from the Spanish Eugenia Carlos Ríos, which means in Quechua morning star (Venus), eagle and falcon of fire, "of my rebellious poetic people".

Anka Ninawaman moved to the city of Cusco and studied education at the National University of Saint Anthony the Abbot in Cuzco, where she wrote her undergraduate thesis with the title Literatura oral en la Escuela de Choqecancha which also contained Cusco Quechua literature. As there was no Peruvian professor available to talk with her in Quechua at an academic level to defend the thesis, Bruce Mannheim from the United States came to solve the problem. During her time in Cusco, shed worked as a Spanish-Quechua translator.

Ch'aska Anka Ninawaman did her master thesis in Social Science, specializing in Ethnic Studies, at the Latin American Faculty of Social Sciences in Quito.

== Career ==
Then, she moved to Paris to work as a lecturer at the INALCO (National Institute for Oriental Languages and Civilizations).

She published her first poetry book Ch'askaschay in Cusco Quechua with a Spanish translation in Quito in 2004. In Ecuador, she also learned Ecuadorian Kichwa, and therefore, she also wrote some poems published in Kichwa and others in Cusco Quechua for the book T'ika Chumpicha. In this books, Anka Ninawaman highlights that in her community and family there was all kind of non-written poetic repertoire she had heard from her childhood on. Therefore, according to Ch'aska, “T'ika Chumpicha responds to the poetry of the oral Quechua world”.

== Works ==
=== Poetry ===
- 2004: Ch'askaschay. Quito, Editorial Abya Yala, 167 pp. ISBN 997822355X, 9789978223550
- 2010: T’ika Chumpicha. Mama P’itikina. Poesía moderna en Kichwa ecuatoriano y Quechua peruano. Quito, Editorial Abya Yala.

=== Articles ===
- 2005: La producción literaria en el idioma quechua como una alternativa en el fortalecimiento de la identidad e interculturalidad. En: Ariruma Kowii & J. A. Fernández Silva (eds.). Identidad lingüística de los pueblos indígenas de la región andina. Quito: Universidad Andina Simón Bolívar, Sede Ecuador, Ediciones Abya-Yala / Roma: Instituto Ítalo-Latino Americano, pp. 153–177.
- 2007: T’ika Chumpicha. Poesía oral quechua-kichwa. Runasimipi puymamanta. Ómnibus N.º 13.
- 2011: Juego de enamoramiento en el Ejido : identidades e imaginarios de las jóvenes de Atápulo, Tesis. Quito, Universidad Politécnica Salesiana : FLACSO Ecuador.

== Bibliography ==
- Mancosu, Paola (2018). La autotraducción de Ch’aska Anka Ninawaman. Un análisis lingüístico del español andino. América Crítica, 2(1), 9-24. https://doi.org/10.13125/americacritica/3186.
- Mancosu, Paola (2019). Aproximaciones postcoloniales a la traducción de los poemas de Ch’aska Anka Ninawaman. Lingue e Linguaggi, 30, 151–161.
- Zevallos Aguilar, Ulises Juan (2011). Recent Peruvian Quechua poetry beyond Andean and neoliberal utopias. En: Kim Beauchesne & Alessandra Santos (eds.). The Utopian Impulse in Latin America. Basingstoke: Palgrave Macmillan. Chapter 14, pp. 275–294.
