= Leckott Zamora =

Wichí writer, artist and activist

Audencio Zamora Leckott
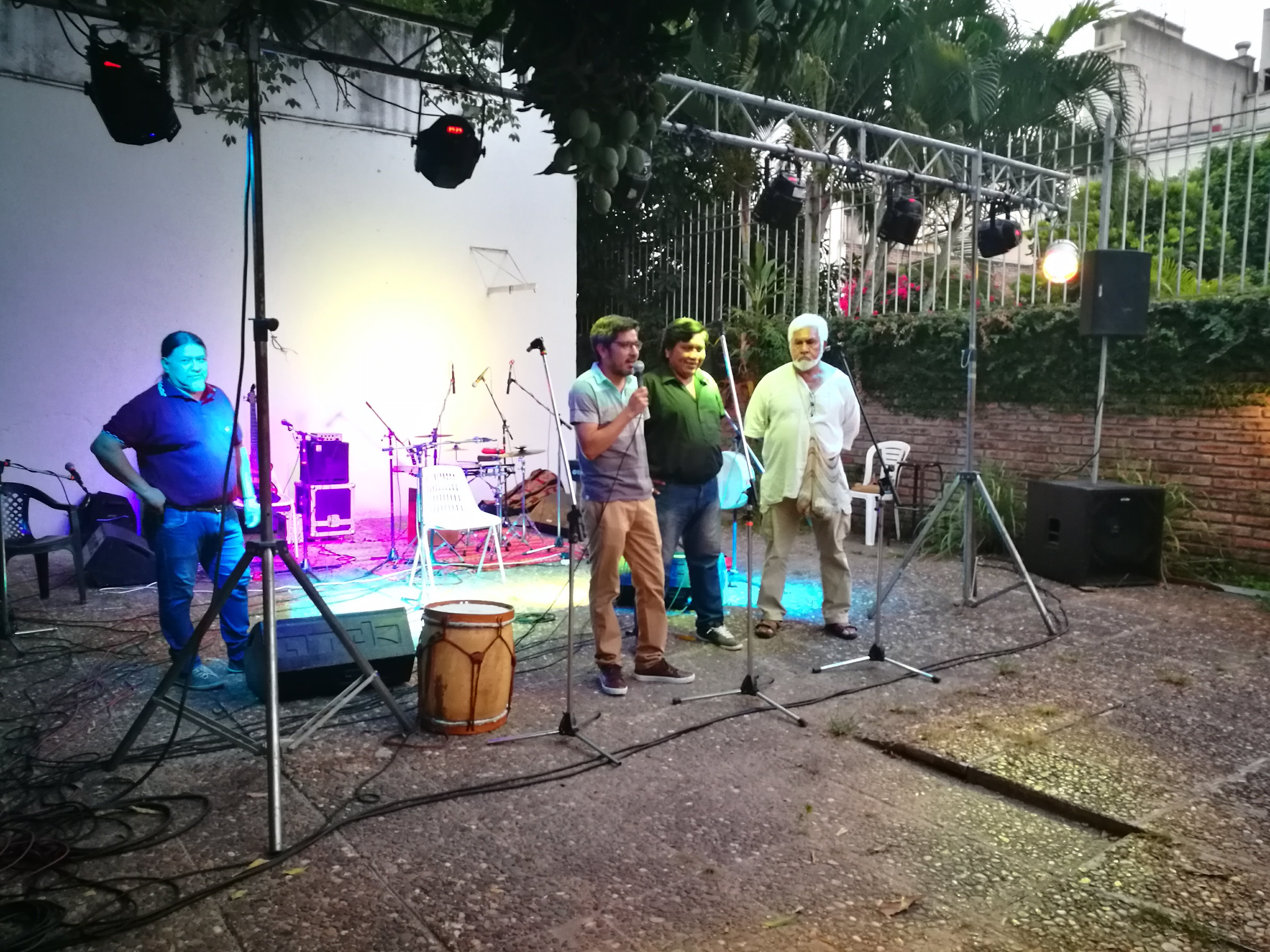
- Lecko Zamora at the anniversary of the Chelaalapí Qom Choir.
- Born: 1948 (age 77–78); Misión Chaqueña (Argentina)
- Other name: Lecko Zamora
- Citizenship: Argentinian

Audencio “Leckott” Zamora (El Algarrobal, Misión Chaqueña, 1948) is a writer, musician, journalist, cultural model and artisan of the Wichí people. He lived many years in Venezuela and currently resides in Puerto Tirol, Chaco Province. He has written several books about Wichí culture, and helped in several newspaper and scientific articles related to the rights, health and education of indigenous peoples.

== Life and work ==
He was a founding member of the Indigenous Movement of Guayana (Movimiento Indígena de Guayana or MIG), of the Indigenous Ka’riña Movement (Consejo Indígena Ka’riña or CONIKA), of the Ye’kwana Entrepreneur Association (Asociación de Empresarios Ye’kwana or ACEY), in Caura-Erebato, of the Kuyuwi Indigenous Tourism Company (Empresa de Turismo Indígena Kuyuwi) in Maripa, Venezuela. He collaborated with the Indigenous Federation of Bolívar (Federación Indígena de Bolívar or FIB), the National Council of Venezuelan Indians (Consejo Nacional Indio de Venezuela or CONIVE), the Indigenous Peoples Confederation of Bolivia (Confederación de Pueblos Indígenas de Bolivia or CIDOB), the Captaincy Organization of the Tapiete and Wennhayek Indigenous Peoples (Organización de Capitanías de los Pueblos Indígenas Tapiete y Wennhayek or ORCAWETA), and with the Cacique Council of the Bermejo Area (Consejo de Caciques de la Zona Bermejo), Salta Province. He was also president of the Chaco Artisanal Foundation (Fundación Chaco Artesanal).

He collaborated and appeared in shows with the group Choss Ph’anté, with the Chelaalapí Qom Choir and with Jerez Le Cam Ensemble in the opera Las voces del silencio (The Voices of Silence), which was shown in the White Whale section of the Kirchner Cultural Centre, in Buenos Aires, with the participation of Octarina Zamora, and in other cities of Argentina and France.

He is currently a member of the Consultant's Committee of the Indigenous Peoples Program (Programa Pueblos Indígenas) of the National University of the Northeast in Resistencia, Chaco. He is a member of the Indigenous Documentation Center No’lhametwet of Chaco's Institute of Culture's Indigenous Peoples Program where he carries out discussion groups and workshops related to the regional indigenous peoples.

== Publications ==
=== Books ===
- Ecos de la Resistencia Resistencia: Minister of Education, Culture, Science and Technology; ConTexto. (2018). 2nd edition.
- Echoes of the Resistance: the light of the ancestors (2017). Miami: Alexandria Library.
- Chico J, Ancalao L, Castells M. Lenguaje: poesía en idiomas indígenas americanos (2015). Córdoba: International Poetry Festival.
- El árbol de la vida wichí (2012). Resistencia: Chaco Province's Culture Institute.
- Ecos de la Resistencia (2009). Resistencia: Chaco Province's Culture Institute.

=== Other texts ===
- L'Origen i l'Ara dels Wichí. Quaderns d'educació contínua, (25), 85–90. (2011)
- América en Octubre. (2005)
- Estamos. (2005)
