= Gretchen Bataille =

American biographer and academic administrator (born 1944)

14th President of University of North Texas
- In office September 1, 2006 – February 22, 2010
- Preceded by: Norval Pohl
- Succeeded by: Phil Diebel (interim)

Personal details
- Born: September 28, 1944 (age 81)
- Education: California Polytechnic State University; Drake University

Gretchen M. Bataille (born September 28, 1944) is an American biographer and academic administrator specializing in American Indian literature and women in positions of power. She was the 14th president of the University of North Texas from 2006 to 2010.

== Life ==
=== Early life and education ===
Bataille was born on September 28, 1944. She completed her undergraduate and master's degrees at California Polytechnic State University. She went on to earn a Ph.D. in English from Drake University, where she focused her research on American Indian literature.

=== Career ===
Bataille’s was a faculty member at Iowa State University for almost twenty years. She provided consulting services at the Fashion Institute of Technology in for ten months. Bataille was the provost and academic vice president at Washington State University and provost of the College of Letters and Science at the University of California, Santa Barbara. She was an associate dean for academic personnel at the ASU College of Liberal Arts and Sciences and chair of its English department. Bataille was the acting associate dean of instruction at California State Polytechnic University at Pomona. Starting in 2000, she served as senior vice president for academic affairs at the University of North Carolina. In June 2005, Bataille succeeded Wade Hobgood as the interim chancellor at the University of North Carolina School of the Arts. She was succeeded by John Mauceri on July 1, 2006.

On September 1, 2006, Bataille became the 14th president of the University of North Texas (UNT), succeeding Norval Pohl. She was the first woman to hold the role. She also worked as a tenured professor of English. On February 25, 2010, Bataille, who resigned as UNT president on February 22, 2010, clarified that her departure was not initiated by her. The resignation came amid ongoing tensions between Bataille and University of North Texas System chancellor Lee F. Jackson. She indicated that the resignation was the result of a decision by the UNT board, not due to any personal or performance issues. Bataille expressed her disappointment and surprise at how the situation unfolded, emphasizing her ongoing commitment to the university. She was succeeded by interim president Phil Diebel.

As of 2015, Bataille serves as the president of GMB Consulting Group, LLC, a consulting firm specializing in strategic and academic advice. She is also a strategic partner with ROI Consulting Group. She was the a senior vice president for the American Council on Education.

=== Scholarship ===
Bataille's scholarly work includes a range of publications in American Indian literature, including reviews, articles, academic papers, and books. She co-authored Faculty Career Paths: Multiple Routes to Academic Success and Satisfaction with Betsy Brown and co-edited Managing the Unthinkable: Crisis Preparation and Response for Campus Leaders with Diana Cordova in 2014. Bataille has been an active speaker at various colleges, universities, and leadership programs. She is recognized for her work in programs focusing on women’s leadership.
