= Devon A. Mihesuah =

Choctaw historian and writer

Devon Abbott Mihesuah (born June 2, 1957) is a Choctaw historian and writer. She is a former editor of American Indian Quarterly and an enrolled citizen of the Choctaw Nation. She is the Cora Lee Beers Price Professor in the Humanities Program at the University of Kansas. She is the second Native woman to receive a named/distinguished professorship (the first is Henrietta Mann). Her lineage is well-documented in multiple tribal records. Her great, great, great-grandfather signed the Treaty of Dancing Rabbit Creek. His son, Charles Wilson, served as sheriff and treasurer of Sugar Loaf County in Moshulatubbee District of the Choctaw Nation. His murder in 1884 is documented in Choctaw Crime and Punishment and Roads of my Relations. Her great-grandfather, Thomas Abbott, created the blueprints for the town of McAlester, Oklahoma and his son, Thomas, served as Chief of Police. They are chronicled in "'Gentleman' Tom Abbott: Middleweight Champion of the Southwest," The Chronicles of Oklahoma 68 (Spring 1990): 426–437.

Mihesuah has written award-winning books and articles about colonization, boarding schools, stereotypes, research methodologies, Indigenous women, AIM, repatriation, racism, violence against Natives, "fake news," slander and libel against Natives, in addition to a series of award-winning novels.

== Awards ==
- Daniel F. Austin Award Presented by the Society for Economic Botany; Gourmand International's World Cookbook Awards: Best Book Award for Arctic, University Press and Heritage Categories, 2020; High Country News's “This Season’s Best Reads,” November 11, 2019; Literary Hub's Best of University Press Books, 2019; EcoWatch's Best Environmental Books of August, 2019 for Indigenous Food Sovereignty in the U.S.: Restoring Cultural Knowledge, Protecting Environments, and Regaining Health.
- Oklahoma Writer's Federation Trophy Award for Best Non-Fiction Book; Finalist, Oklahoma Book Award; Best of the Rest Law and Order History-True West Magazine, for Ned Christie: The Creation of an Outlaw and Cherokee Hero.
- Trophy Award for the Best Fiction Book of 2011 presented by the Oklahoma Writers' Federation for Document of Expectations
- Outstanding Book on Oklahoma History Award presented by the Oklahoma Historical Society for Choctaw Crime and Punishment, 1884-1907
- Trophy Award for the Best Non-Fiction Book of 2009 presented by the Oklahoma Writers' Federation for Choctaw Crime and Punishment, 1884-1907
- Finalist, Oklahoma Book Award for Choctaw Crime and Punishment, 1884-1907
- Special Award of the Jury of the Gourmand World Cookbook Awards, for Recovering Our Ancestors’ Gardens: Indigenous Recipes and Guide to Diet and Fitness; Finalist for Best in the World Cookbook.
- Wordcraft Circle of Native Writers' Best Research Book of the Year; Finalist, Gustavus Myers Center for the Study of Bigotry and Human Rights; and Arizona Writer's Association Best Non-Fiction Book Honorable Mention for So You Want to Write About American Indians? A Guide for Scholars, Students and Writers
- Finalist Oklahoma Book Awards, Grand Canyon Rescue
- Oklahoma Writers’ Federation Trophy Award for Best Non-Fiction Book, American Indigenous Women: Decolonization, Empowerment, Activism
- Oklahoma Writers’ Federation Trophy Award for Young Adult Novel Award for Lost and Found.
- Arizona Writers’ Association Best Book of the Year, for Grand Canyon Rescue.
- Wordcrafters’ Circle of Native Writers’ Journal Editor of the Year Award for the American Indian Quarterly, 2001
- Oklahoma Writers’ Federation Trophy Award for Best Fiction Book for The Roads of My Relations
- Critics' Choice Award of the American Educational Studies Association for Natives and Academics: Researching and Writing About American Indians.
- Critics' Choice Award from the American Educational Studies Association, for Cultivating the Rosebuds.

Mihesuah is also the recipient of awards from the American Council of Learned Societies, American Educational Studies Association, American Historical Association, Arizona Humanities Council, Flagstaff Live!, Ford Foundation, KU Crystal Eagle American Indian Leadership Award, National Endowment for the Humanities, Newberry Library, Phi Alpha Theta, Smithsonian Institution, Westerners International, Wordcraft Circle of Native Writers. At NAU she received the Native American Students United Award for Outstanding Faculty, President's Award for Outstanding Faculty, and Outstanding Faculty Woman of the Year Award.

== Bibliography ==
=== Fiction ===
- Blood Relay (Bantam, 2026)
- The Bone Picker. Native Stories, Alternate Histories (University of Oklahoma Press, 2024)
- Hatak holhkunna--The Witches (University of Arizona Press, 2021)
- Document of Expectations (Michigan State University Press, 2011)
- Big Bend Luck (Booklocker, 2008)
- The Lightning Shrikes (Lyons Press, 2004)
- Grand Canyon Rescue (Booklocker, 2004)
- Roads of My Relations (University of Arizona Press, 2000)

=== Nonfiction ===
- Ed. with Elizabeth Hoover Indigenous Food Sovereignty in the U.S.: Restoring Cultural Knowledge, Protecting Environments, and Regaining Health (University of Oklahoma Press, 2019).
- Ned Christie: The Creation of an Outlaw and Cherokee Hero (University of Oklahoma Press, 2018)
- Choctaw Crime and Punishment, 1884-1907 (University of Oklahoma Press, 2009)
- Recovering Our Ancestors’ Gardens: Indigenous Recipes and Guide to Diet and Fitness (Nebraska, 2005)
- So You Want to Write About American Indians? A Guide for Scholars, Writers and Students (University of Nebraska Press, 2005)
- ed. with Angela Cavender Wilson, Indigenizing the Academy: Transforming Scholarship and Empowering Communities (Nebraska, 2004)
- ed. First to Fight: The Story of Henry Mihesuah (Nebraska, 2003)
- American Indigenous Women: Decolonization, Empowerment, Activism (Nebraska, 2003)
- ed. Repatriation Reader: Who Owns Indian Remains? (Nebraska, 2000)
- ed. Natives and Academics: Research and Writing About American Indians (Nebraska, 1998)
- American Indians: Stereotypes and Realities (Clarity International, 1996)
- Cultivating the Rosebuds: The Education of Women at the Cherokee Female Seminary, 1851-1909 (University of Illinois Press, 1993)

== See also ==
- Notable tribal members of the Choctaw Nation of Oklahoma
- List of writers from peoples indigenous to the Americas
- Native American Studies
