= Hesquiat Peninsula =

Coordinates: 49°26′N 126°31′W

The Hesquiat Peninsula is a peninsula on the West Coast of Vancouver Island, British Columbia, located northwest of the town of Tofino and Clayoquot Sound and Nootka Sound to the northwest. It marks the division between the two regions formed by those sounds and is named for the Hesquiaht people of the Nuu-chah-nulth, and is the location of Hesquiat Peninsula Provincial Park. The Estevan Point lighthouse is at the apex of the peninsula.`
