= E. Donald Two-Rivers =

American dramatist

E. Donald "Ed" Two-Rivers, sometimes known as Donald Two-River, was an Anishinaabe (Ojibwa) poet, playwright and spoken-word performer.

Brought up first on the reservation and then in the urban Native community in Chicago, Two-Rivers has been an activist for Native rights since the 1970s, for which he was awarded the Iron Eyes Cody Award for Peace in 1992. He is also an accomplished poet, who has, among other honours, been awarded the American Book Award in 1992. A critic of "victim politics", Two-Rivers is a strong supporter of programs that give disadvantaged Native peoples the chance to stand on their own two feet.

He had been critical of Euro-American directors and actors in the past, saying that "I believe that for non-Natives to perform a Native American play, they would first have to undergo a certain level of sensitivity training. In fact, I would require it for any of my plays."

E. Donald Two-Rivers was the founding (Artistic Director) of the Chicago-based Red Path Theater Company.

In 2007, he returned to Chicago, to work on his last book In the Spirit of the Coyote.

He died December 27, 2008.

In 2009, a mosaic inspired by his poem "Indian Land Dancing" was dedicated in the Uptown neighborhood of Chicago.

== Bibliography ==
=== Plays ===
- Chili Corn
- Coyote Sits In Judgement
- Forked Tongues
- I Aint Tonto
- No Honors Today
- Old Indian
- Peeking Out Of Ameriks Museums
- Pow-Wow Posse
- Red Requiem - A Political Intrigue On City Streets
- Shattered Dream
- Sunka Cheslie (The Urban Pile)
- Survivors Medicine
- Whats Buzzin Cousin?
- Winter Summit
- Briefcase Warriors

=== Short story collections ===
- Survivors' Medicine

=== Poetry anthologies ===
- Pow-Wows and Fat Cats Mammoth 2003, available at www.mammothpublications.com
- A Dozen Cold Ones by Two Rivers: Native American Poetry in an Urban Setting March Abrazo 1992

== See also ==
- List of writers from peoples indigenous to the Americas
- Native American Studies
