= Victoria Belcourt Callihoo =

Western Canadian centenarian

- Born: Victoria Anne Belcourt; November 19, 1861; Lac Ste. Anne, British North America
- Died: April 21, 1966 (aged 104); St. Albert, Alberta, Canada

Victoria Belcourt Callihoo (1861–1966) was a French-Métis woman whose life spanned the formation of Canada in 1867 and the formation of the province of Alberta 1905. She is the subject of the biography Victoria Callihoo: An Amazing Life.

Callihoo, née Belcourt, was born in Lac Ste. Anne on November 19, 1861, to a French father and a Métis mother. At that time Lac Ste. Anne was under the control if the Hudson's Bay Company. At the age of thirteen she participated in her first buffalo hunt along with her mother, a medicine woman. In 1878 she married Louis Jerome Callihoo with whom she had fourteen children of which twelve survived infancy.

The couple lived in the area of Lac Ste. Anne, at various times farming, running a sawmill and a hotel. Beginning in the 1940s Callihoo began writing biographical sketches for the Alberta Historical Review, which included first-person histories of Métis life. In 1960 the Alberta Historical Review published Callihoo's account of her first buffalo hunt entitled Our Buffalo Hunts.

Belcourt died on April 21, 1966, in St. Albert, Alberta at the age of 104.
