= Ariruma Kowii =

Ecuadorian poet of Quechua origin

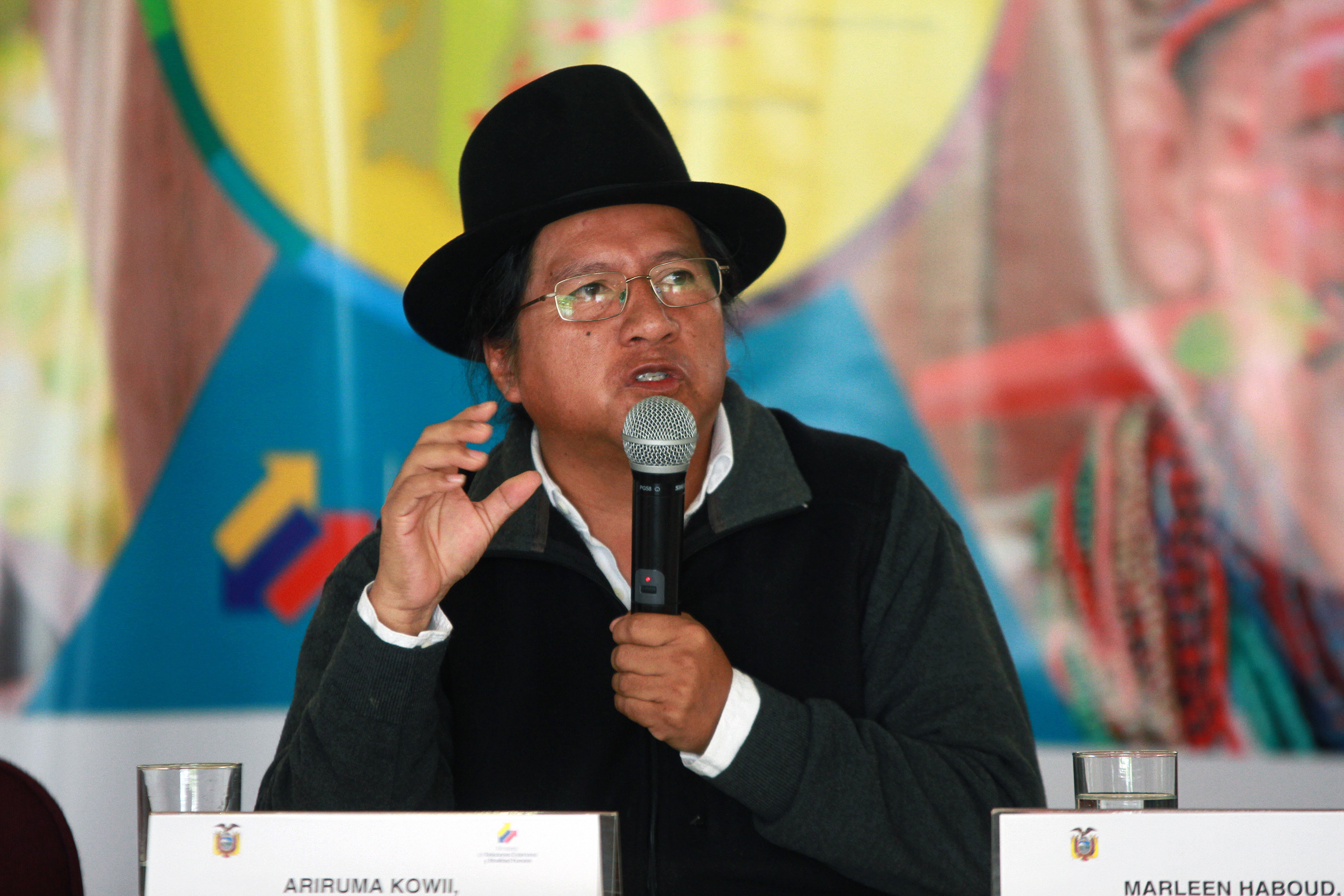
Quito, 20 feb (ANDES). The chancellery was held on the international day of the mother tongue, with expert presentations such as Marleen Haboud and Ariuma Kowii.

Ariruma Kowii (born Jacinto Conejo Maldonado) is an Ecuadorian poet of Quechua origin. He was born in Otavalo in 1961. He studied at the Central University of Ecuador. He has worked at the Quito newspaper Hoy.

Kowii is considered to be a significant poet in the Kichwa language. His debut collection Mutsuktsurini (1988) was one of the first books to be written and published exclusively in Kichwa. He has published two more books since then: Tsaitsik (1993) and Diccionario de nombres quichuas (1998).

He is the brother of a mayor of Otavalo, Mario Conejo Maldonado.
