= Ernestine Hayes =

Tlingit writer, poet, and former Alaska State Writer Laureate

Ernestine Saankaláxt Hayes
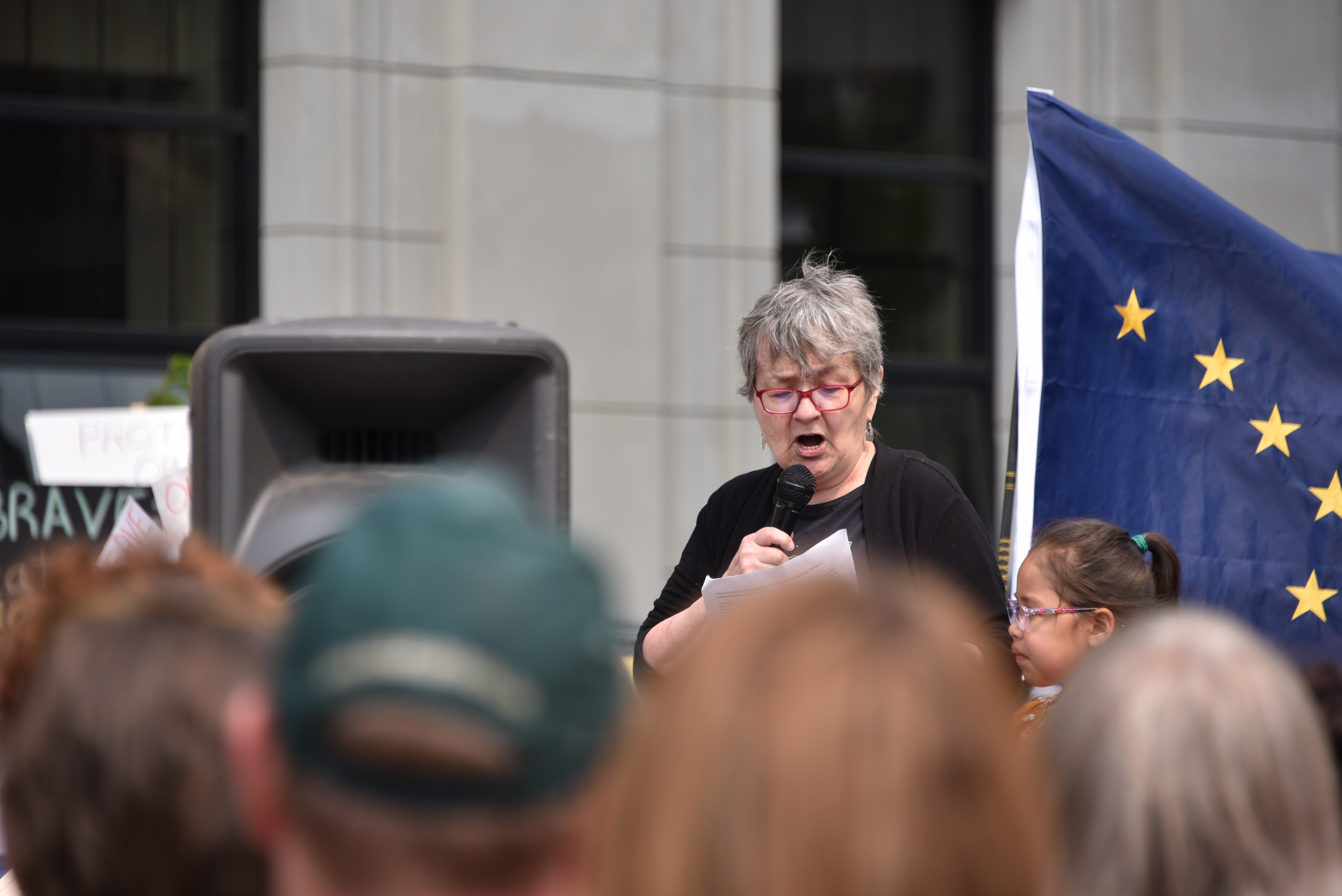
- Ernestine Hayes speaking in front of the Alaska State Capitol in July 2019
- Born: 1945 (age 80–81); Juneau, Alaska
- Occupations: Memoirist; writer; professor
- Known for: Author of Blonde Indian and Tao of Raven
- Honours: Alaska State Writer Laureate

Ernestine Saankaláxt Hayes (born 1945) is a Tlingit author and an emerita professor at the University of Alaska Southeast in Juneau, Alaska. She belongs to the Wolf House of the Kaagwaaataan clan of the Eagle side of the Tlingit Nation. Hayes is a memoirist, essayist, and poet. She served as Alaska State Writer Laureate 2017–2018.

== Early life ==
Hayes was born in Juneau at the end of the Second World War when Alaska was still a territory. For the first several years of her life, Hayes lived with her grandmother in the Juneau Indian Village while her mother was in and out of hospitals for tuberculosis. At the age of fifteen, Hayes and her mother moved to California, where Hayes lived for twenty-five years.

== Career ==
Hayes returned to Alaska twenty-five years later, in 1985, where Hayes graduated magna cum laude from the University of Alaska Southeast. In 2003, she graduated from University of Alaska Anchorage with a Master of Fine Arts degree in Creative Writing and Literary Arts. Almost immediately after earning her MFA, she began teaching at the University of Alaska Southeast, while also serving as associated faculty for the University of Alaska Anchorage's low-residence MFA program. Hayes actively promotes Native rights and culture, and works with efforts to decolonize the institution. For just over a year, she wrote a column, "Edge of the Village," for the Juneau Empire. As State Writer Laureate, from 2016 to 2018, Hayes visited many small communities of Alaska, like Seward and Seldovia, where she held two-day creative writing workshops. She retired from the University of Alaska Southeast and conferred as professor emeritus in 2019. Hayes is working on a her third Alaska Native Memoir called Bury These Stories.

== Reviews ==
=== Blonde Indian ===
Blonde Indian, a memoir of Hayes's childhood in Southeast Alaska, is written with traditional Tlingit stories, fictional characters, and historical moments. Because of Hayes' fair hair, her grandmother sang out to her "Blonde Indian, blonde Indian" as Hayes danced along. The fictional tale of "Tom" coincides with an experience similar to Hayes, an Alaska Native child who is separated from their traditional lifestyle and heritage. In Blonde Indian, Hayes elaborates on her experiences in Western society, narrating her lived experience and traditional stories to honor her Tlingit ancestors and tradition, while shedding light on the impact of colonization on Indigenous children and families. Blonde Indian has received much critical acclaim. It was awarded the American Book Award in 2007.

=== The Tao of Raven ===
A continuation of her work in Blonde Indian, The Tao of Raven: an Alaskan Native Memoir weaves together traditional Alaskan Native storytelling and life lessons, with personal memories from Hayes, and legends of the Raven, and the Spider. Thematically, the book centers around redefining the meaning of "treasure," a word that Hayes explained as the time we’ve spent on the earth, rather than any material commodity.

== Awards ==
- 2002 Alaska Native Writer Award, Anchorage Daily News Fiction
- 2005 Rasmuson Project Award
- 2006 Native America Calling October Book of the Month
- 2007 Kiriyama Prize finalist for Blonde Indian, An Alaska Native Memoir
- 2007 PEN-USA non-fiction award finalist
- 2007 American Book Award.
- 2007 HAIL (Honoring Alaska Indigenous Literature) Award
- 2014 Alaska Literary Award
- 2015 Rasmuson Artist Residency Award: Djerassi Artist Residency
- 2015 AWARE Woman of Distinction
- 2016 Named Alaska State Writer Laureate for 2017–2018
- 2021 Rasmuson Foundation Distinguished Artist Award
- 2021 Marie Darlin Prize
- 2023 United States Artists Fellowship
- 2024 Luce Indigenous Knowledge Fellowship
- 2026 Rasmuson Individual Artist Fellowship

== Works ==
- Lingʹit Aanʹi: an Alaska native memoir. University of Alaska Anchorage. 2003.
- Blonde Indian: An Alaska Native Memoir. University of Arizona Press. 2006. ISBN 0-8165-2537-4.
- Aanka Xóodzi ka Aasgutu Xóodzi Shkalneegί. Hazy Island Books. 2010.
- The Story of the Town Bear and the Forest Bear. Hazy Island Books. 2010.
- Images of America JUNEAU. Arcadia Publishing. 2013.
- Tao of Raven: An Alaska Native Memoir. 2017.

=== Anthologies ===
- Bill Sherwonit; Andromeda Romano-Lax, Ellen Bielawski, eds. (2003). "Point Retreat". Travelers' Tales Alaska: True Stories. Travelers' Tales. ISBN 978-1-885211-96-5.

=== Essays ===
- "I don't dance for my father". The Juneau Empire. August 8, 2004. Archived from the original on May 3, 2012.
- "State too quick to take Native children". The Juneau Empire. August 29, 2004. Archived from the original on March 3, 2016.
- "Bias remains the standard". The Juneau Empire. September 28, 2004. Archived from the original on March 9, 2005.
- "There's plenty of government, but not much tribe". The Juneau Empire. October 17, 2004. Archived from the original on September 17, 2008.
- "An honorary White American eyes suburbs". The Juneau Empire. November 14, 2004. Archived from the original on August 21, 2008.
- "Identity is precious enough to protect". The Juneau Empire. February 20, 2005. Archived from the original on March 3, 2016.
- "Affirmative action must include action". The Juneau Empire. March 6, 2005. Archived from the original on March 3, 2016.
- "Remember who you are". The Juneau Empire. April 3, 2005. Archived from the original on March 3, 2016.
- "Indigenous languages key to cultural identity". The Juneau Empire. June 12, 2005. Archived from the original on March 3, 2016.
- "University Raven pole needs an Eagle pole to maintain balance". The Juneau Empire. July 3, 2005. Archived from the original on March 3, 2016.
- "We've not forgotten love of the land". The Juneau Empire. August 7, 2005. Archived from the original on March 3, 2016.
- "Commentary: A trap or box of wisdom: Reaching into the unknown". The Juneau Empire. September 11, 2005. Archived from the original on March 3, 2016.
- "Indigenous Language and AI/AN Student Success". The Huffington Post. March 14, 2012.
- "Raven's Intelligent Design". The Huffington Post. March 22, 2012.
- "It takes a village". The Huffington Post. April 21, 2012.
- "Packing the Invisible Knapsack". The Huffington Post. August 1, 2012.
- "What Shall We Do With Our Heroes?". Alaska Historical Society. 2017.
