= Vee F. Browne =

American journalist

- Born: 1956 (age 69–70); Ganado, Arizona, U.S.
- Education: Western New Mexico University (MA)
- Occupation: Author of children's books

Vee F. Browne (born 1956 in Ganado, Arizona) is an American writer of children's literature, and journalist. She is from Cottonwood and Tselani Arizona, and a member of the Navajo Nation, belonging to the Bitter Water and Water Flows Together clans.

Browne studied journalism at the New Mexico State University. She obtained her M.A. from Western New Mexico University in 1990. She has worked as a journalist in Navajo Hopi Observer. She is also an Arizona Interscholastic Athletic Association volleyball and basketball referee.

== Works ==
- Monster Slayer: A Navajo Folktale, Northland Publishing, 1991
- Monster Birds, Northland Publishing, 1993
- Maria Tallchief: prima ballerina, Modern Curriculum Press, 1995
- Owl: American Indian legends, Scholastic Inc., 1995
- Council of the rsinmakers address book, Northland Publishing, 1995
- Ravens dancing, 1st Books Library, 2001
- Birds and eggs, By Dixie Anderson, Molly Bang, Vee Browne, etal.,(publisher unknown), 2001
- The stone cutter & the Navajo maiden, Salina Bookshelf, 2008

== Awards and recognition ==
- 1992 Western Heritage – Cowboy Hall of Fame Award, for her 1991 book, Monster Slayer
- Buddy Bo Jack Nationwide Award for Humanitaianis for Children's Books
- 1994 Western Books Award of Merit, Rounce & Coffin Club, Los Angeles, for Monster Birds
