= Vera Francis =

American journalist

Vera J. Francis is a Native American educator, environmental activist, and community planner for the Passamaquoddy people. She resides in Perry, Maine within the Passamaquoddy Pleasant Point Reservation (Sipayik). Francis writes and speaks frequently about environmental issues and tribal politics in newspapers, at conferences and on websites.

As part of the non-profit N'tutlankeyutmonen N'kihtaqmikon, Francis has advocated for the environmental preservation of Pleasant Point-Passamaquoddy ancestral territory. Because Passamaquoddy ancestral homeland is now divided by the Canada–United States border along the St. Croix River, Francis has been involved with legal proceedings concerning both countries' governments, including litigation between the Bureau of Indian Affairs, members of the Passamaquoddy-Pleasant Point (Sipayik) Reservation, and Liquefied Natural Gas company Quoddy Bay LNG.

== Quoddy Bay LNG and N'tutlankeyutmonen N'kihtaqmikon ==
In June 2005, Oklahoma Company Quoddy Bay LNG L.L.C. received ground lease approval to be used for the construction of a liquefied natural gas processing and transfer terminal. This lease was acquired through land use approval by the U.S. Bureau of Indian Affairs, despite prior legal agreements explicitly granting internal control to the Passamaquoddy tribes, per the Maine Indian Claims Settlement Act of 1980. The terminal was to be built on Passamaquoddy tribal land held in trust between the BIA and the Passamaquoddy. Though initial approval was facilitated by the BIA, a final vote by tribal members was necessary to approve the lease.

Five months later, Francis' advocacy group Ntulankeyutmonen Nkitahkomikon (NN) entered legal proceedings with Quoddy Bay LNG, citing that despite tribal voting, the lease agreement was improperly approved between the BIA and the Passamaquoddy based on previous land rights. NN has continued to make the claim that Pleasant Point Reservation and surrounding Passamaquoddy territory be used to generate an environmentally sound economy.

Following three years of legal debate between NN and Quoddy Bay LNG, the United States Federal Energy Regulatory Commission dismissed Quoddy Bay's application for the LNG terminal after the company failed to provide sufficient environmental research. FERC's October 2008 decision to dismiss the application without prejudice granted the potential for Quoddy Bay LNG to resubmit materials for FERC approval at a later date, thus delaying the project independently from tribal intervention. Because the issue of Passamaquoddy tribal land ownership remained outstanding, legal proceedings continued.

The Maine Federal District Court established after lengthy legal proceedings that the Quoddy Bay case undergo administrative appeal through the Interior Board of Indian Appeals. With proper jurisdiction, IBIA judge Deborah G. Luther ruled the original lease agreement invalid, recognizing that the BIA had violated its own rules against lease of tribal land. On June 9, 2009, the Passamaquoddy tribal council voted unanimously to end its lease with Quoddy Bay LNG. The Federal Energy Regulatory Commission notes that Quoddy Bay LNG has not refiled for environmental approval, thus ending any iteration of the project.

== Publications ==
- "Defending the Rights of the Passamaquoddy." Speech. 2008 New Brunswick Social Forum. New Brunswick, Canada. Archive.org. The Internet Archive, 14 Nov. 2008. 1 Apr. 2013.
- "LNG Opinion." Yahoo! Groups. Yahoo!, 29 Aug. 2004. 01 Apr. 2013.
- "Passamaquoddy Group Demands Delay of Liquefied Natural Gas Terminal and More Information..." Cultural Survival Quarterly 28.4 (2004): n. pag. Cultural Survival. Cultural Survival.org, 7 May 2010. Web. 1 Apr. 2013.
