= Irma Alvarez Ccoscco =

Peruvian writer

- Born: Haquira, Peru
- Occupations: poet, language activist
- Writing career
- Language: Quechua, Spanish
- Genre: poetry
- Notable awards: Smithsonian Fellow

Irma Álvarez Ccoscco (born in Haquira, Peru) is a Quechua-language poet, educator and digital language activist.

== Language activism ==
Alvarez Ccoscco's language activism focuses on software use and development for Quechua. She has been involved in projects about the use of Quechua language and other Indigenous languages in radio, software decolonization, and programmers in Peru and the United States. Her work includes computer games such as Tux for Kids and electronic learning platforms such as Chamilo. She participated in the implementation of the Simidic electronic dictionary for offline use for indigenous languages. She is also involved in podcast projects for which she records contributions in Quechua, for example for Llaqtaypa Rimaynin (“language of my people”) and Amaru Taytakunapak [sic] (“snake for the fathers”) for Ecuadorian Indigenous communities in New York City

Álvarez Ccoscco writes Quechua-language poems that have appeared in online and print media, including Ínsula Barataria, And Then 21, and Atuqpa Chupan (“The Fox's Tail”). She is a former fellow of the Artist Leadership Program at Smithsonian’s National Museum of the American Indian.

== Works ==
- Runasimipi Qillqaspa (Smithsonian Institution, 2019)
