= Graciela Huinao =

Chilean poet and fiction writer

Graciela del Carmen Huinao Alarcón
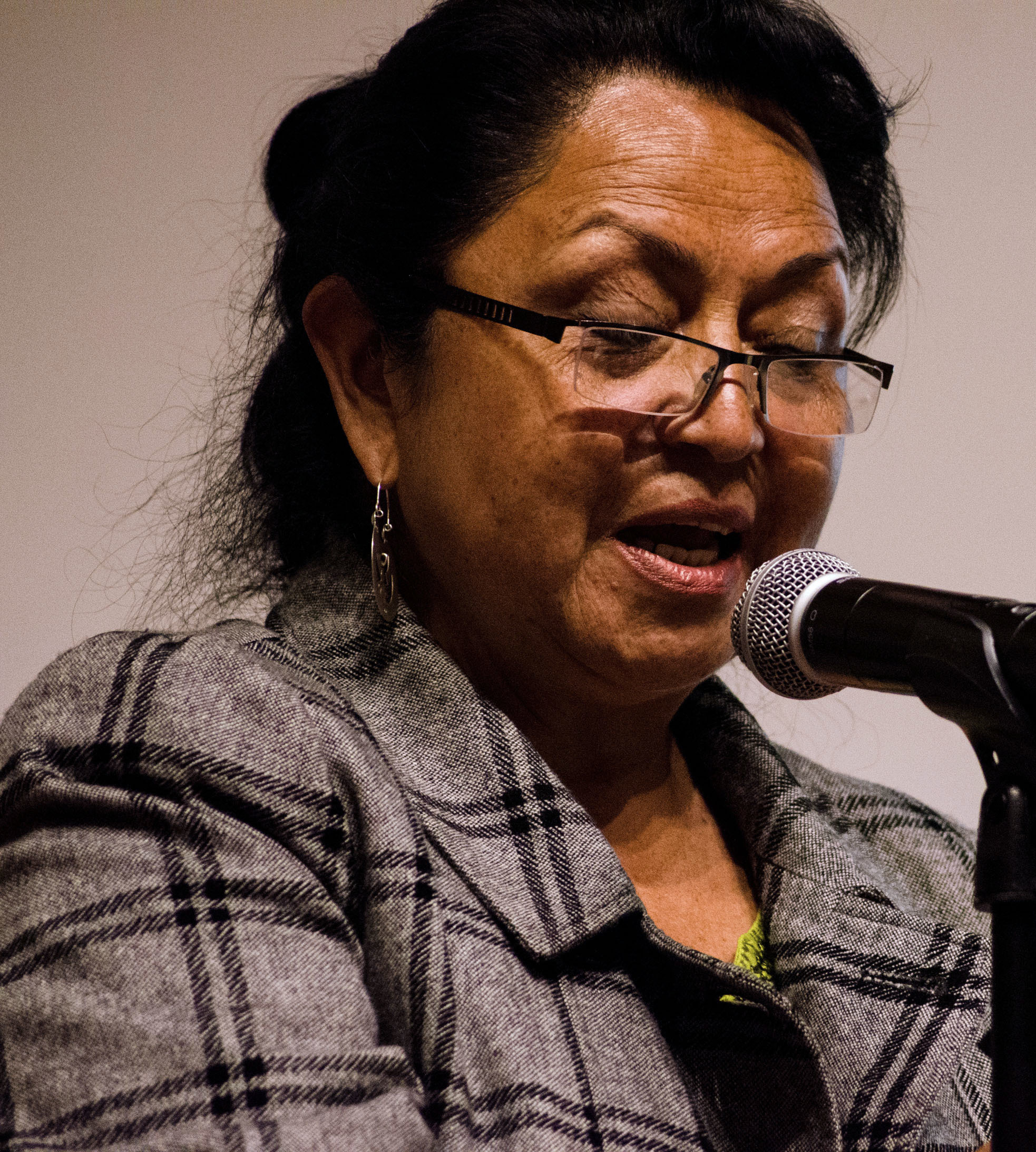
- Huinao at a poetry reading in 2016
- Born: 1956 (age 69–70) Osorno, Chile
- Occupation: Poet, fiction writer
- Language: Spanish

Graciela Huinao (born 1956) is a Mapuche poet and fiction writer. Huinao, who writes in Spanish, is the first Indigenous woman to join the Academia Chilena de la Lengua.

== Biography ==
Graciela Huinao was born in the area of Osorno, Chile, in 1956. Her parents, Herminia Alarcón and Dolorindo Huinao Loi, were Huilliche. Huinao's education began in 1962, when she enrolled in Escuela 107. She was raised speaking Spanish, not Mapudungun, because her father had been punished at school for speaking his native language and he feared she would experience the same; she later studied her ancestral language as an adult.

Her grandfather, Adolfo Huinao, had fled at the age of 5 with his mother from their native island to Chile when their island was invaded and Adolfo's father and his elder brother were murdered. According to Huinao, Adolfo was not Mapuche, but likely Kawésqar or Chono.

Huinao's mother died in 1969, when she was 13 years old, and her father died eight years later, in 1977. After his death, she moved to Santiago.

She published her first poem, "La Loika" in 1989. Her first book, Walinto, was published in 2001; it was rereleased in 2008 in Mapudungun, Spanish, and English. This book of poetry was named for the Mapuche community in which she was born, which is located 36 kilometers from Osorno.

Huinao has also written short stories and a novel, and her work has been anthologized in several collections, including Hilando en la memoria, 7 poetas mapuche (2006), Hilando en la memoria, epu rapa. 14 mujeres poetas mapuche (2009), and Antología Ciudadana de Voces Mapuche (2022).

Her work has also been published in translation, including into English, Chinese, Hebrew, and Indigenous languages of North America.

Huinao became the first Indigenous woman to join the Academia Chilena de la Lengua in 2014.

== Selected works ==
- Walinto, poetry, bilingual edition, with translation into Mapudungun by Clara Antinao Varas; published by La Garza Morena, Santiago, 2001 (republished by Cuarto Propio, 2008, in a trilingual format: Mapudungun-Spanish-English)
- La nieta del brujo, seis relatos williche, Caballo de Mar, 2003
- Desde el fogón de una casa de putas williche, novel, Caballo del Mar, 2010
- Katrilef, hija de un ülmen mapuche williche. Relato de su vida, Instituto de Investigación en Ciencias Sociales, 2015
