= Lewis Mitchell =

American politician

Lewis Mitchell (c. 1847–1930), a Native American member of the Maine State Legislature in the late 1800s into the early 1900s, is known for his advocacy of the Passamaquoddy people and his work on a plethora of writings in the Passamaquoddy language, of which only some have been preserved. Although he was Passamaquoddy, he was widely versed in Wabanaki tradition, as Wabanaki was the overall surrounding language and more general culture of not just Maine, but the Canadian and New England area, home to several indigenous tribes during this time period (a decent amount of which still exist today, including the Passamaquoddy peoples, Mitchell's native tribe).

== Political career ==
As a tribal representative, he is most well-known for his 1887 speech delivered to the Maine State Legislature, that illuminated prior treaties guaranteeing Passamaquoddy land to the Passamaquoddy people, in order to provide a civil argument asking the government to recognize the Passamaquoddy right to hunt and fish, etc. on their own land (or rather, land that had been unlawfully sold). According to some, Mitchell is the first tribal member to have written in the Passamaquoddy language.

== Literary translations ==
Naturally, when many original manuscripts were destroyed in a fire that happened at John Dyneley Prince's home in 1911, Prince asked Mitchell to recreate these documents from memory. Not only did Prince and Mitchell share a community, but Mitchell was a known consultant for Prince. Earlier in Mitchell's life, he had served as consultant for Charles Leland, particularly on his text The Algonquin Legends of New England, published in 1884. Mitchell relied heavily on this text in order to reproduce the old Wabanki tales, exploits and adventures of Koluskap; the majority of Mitchell's recreation is said to be merely a translation of Leland's work from English into Passamaquoddy. These translations unfortunately contained a significant bias on the part of Leland. He believed that the Wabanaki people were connected culturally, and historically to the Norse. Many of his translations were skewed to align with this theory. It is also said that Mitchell is the first to have ever written, or at least to have kept written documentation in Passamaquoddy (using his own spelling and language system). John Dyneley Prince and Lewis Mitchell switch back and forth between their native languages, respectively. One chapter is written by Lewis in Passamaquoddy, the following reiterated by Prince in English.

== An excerpt of Mitchell's translations ==
I sit and I beat the drum. I summon the animals and even the
storm winds obey my drum.

I sit and I beat the drum. Even the storms and thunders answer
me when I drum; and indeed great Aplasemwesit stops, obeying
my drum.

I sit and drum. Then Chebelakw comes and obeys my drum.
At its sound, great Wuchowsen stops his wings and obeys the
sound of my drum (when it sounds).

I sit and I beat my drum. Even the spirits under water come
out and they obey my drum and the Chopper ceases chopping and
obeys my drum.

I sit and beat my drum and great Apodumken comes out and
he also obeys my drum.

The lightnings, thunders, stormwinds, storms, Atwusk nlges,
Aplasemwesit, the water sprites and Chebelakw, all together, come
to obey the sound of my drum.

— John Dyneley Prince
Translation:

Nil nolpin naka ntet li-tum n pekholak n. Nitut-li-wikw tahan
weyusis k naka na petciu wutcauVn l w tciksitmakon npekholak n.

Nolpin naka ntet li-tum n pekholak n. Petciu mutckiskak p takik
ntasitemakok pekhola; naka na k tci Aplas mwesit tceniso; w tciksitm n
npekholak n.

Nolpin naka npekholin. Nit-te Tcipila kw w petciyan naka w tciksit
makon npekholak n. Eltakwak k tci WutcauVn w tcenekla w neski
naka w tciksitm n eltakwak npekholak n.

Nolpin naka ntuktem n npekholak n. Petciu-te Lampekwin wuk
muskapaswuk naka w tciksitm nya npekholak n naka na Atwusk nikus
tcenakwetehiye naka w tciksitm n npekholak n.

Nolpin naka ntuktem n npekholak n naka k tci Apotumk n muskatin-
te na nek m w tciksitm n npekholak n.

Pesakwut wuk, petakiyik, wutcauVn l, mutckiskakil, Atwusk niges,
Aplasemwesit, Lampekwin wuk, Tcipila kw, m siu-te mawe-petapaswuk
natci-tciksitm nya eltakwak npekholak n.

— Mitchell

=== Explanation ===
In the excerpt from Prince's collaboration with Mitchell above, it exhibits lyrics that speak of summoning spirits and animals/creatures. Mitchell was a highly distinguished member of his community, yet he was still quite in touch with what some may consider his more "mythical" roots. Mitchell was regarded as an intelligent man, one of few who could write and translate Wabanaki into English and vice versa. He was a member of the Maine State Legislature, spoke in the courtroom to advocate for Passamaquoddy rights, and was often sought out for his expertise and consultation by other highly regarded members of the white community (like Leland and Prince).

At the same time, he still published stories (particularly that of Koluskap) right along with his more governmental and reformative letters and documents directed toward Maine's government. This is notable because Mitchell was able to maintain his status in and around his community with not only his people, but with white people as well. He also wrote stories that some may consider either fictional or absurd, remaining true to his ancestry while advocating for the Passamaquoddy people with great vivacity and conviction. Mitchell was known for his professionalism intermixed with his heritage, and he was able to maintain that status amongst his colleagues, peers, opposers and supporters of both races.

He is known for Native publications that express his cultural background and a more non-conventional form of expression, at least in the white world (for Native Americans, these stories, poems and songs are just as relevant if not more than any court system that has been implemented since the creation of these generational stories that Indigenous peoples, in this case the Passamaquoddy, and the Wabanaki on a grander scale, have passed down as rightful knowledge for as long as they have existed).

== Personal life ==
Other than his government position and writing, Mitchell was known for his skill at canoeing. During hunting season, Mitchell would be hired to take hunting parties out to areas good for porpoise and seals. The canoes he used and built were made of white birch bark. According to a July 1881 edition of the Mount Desert Herald, Mitchell made the record of traveling 60 miles in a mere 12 hours around Mount Desert Island in Maine. Also, according to passersby in a tugboat, Mitchell was seen waving his arms in what looked like distress, only to be in need of a book of matches. This practice was known as the Canoe Club, and Passamaquoddy were known for their expertise in building and manning these traditionally constructed paddles and canoes. Not only was Mitchell revered in both pen and the courtroom, but he was a skilled and reverenced man in his community, known for his cultural skill and knowledge.
