= Waziyatawin =

Dakota academic, author and activist

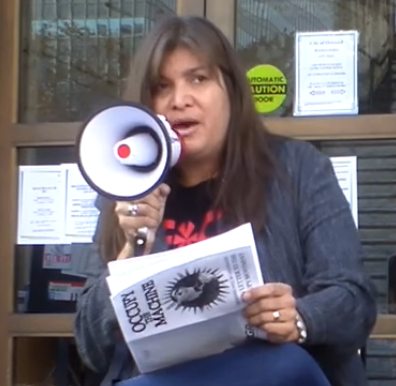
- Waziyatawin in 2011
- Born: Angela Lynn Cavender; February 13, 1968 (age 58); Virginia, Minnesota
- Other name: Angela Cavender Wilson

Academic background
- Education: University of Minnesota; Cornell University
- Thesis: De Kiksuyapo! (Remember This!): The Eli Taylor Narratives and Dakota Conceptions of History (2000)

Academic work
- Discipline: American history
- Sub-discipline: History of Native Americans in the United States
- Main interests: Indigenous decolonization
- Website: waziyatawin.blogspot.com

Waziyatawin is a Wahpetunwan Dakota professor, author, and activist from the Pezihutazizi Otunwe (Yellow Medicine Village) in southwestern Minnesota.

Her research interests include Indigenous women's roles in resisting colonialism, recovering Indigenous knowledge, and truth-telling as part of restorative justice. She has authored and edited several books about Dakota history, Indigenous resistance, and strategies for decolonization.

Waziyatawin is recognized as a leading Indigenous intellectual and was a Canada Research Chair in Indigenous Peoples in the Indigenous Governance Program at the University of Victoria. She taught at Arizona State University from 2000 to 2007.

== Early life and education ==
Waziyatawin was born Angela Lynn Cavender in 1968, in Virginia, Minnesota to Chris Mato Nunpa, a former professor of Indigenous Nations & Dakota Studies at Southwest Minnesota State University, and Edith Brown Travers, a social service director. She grew up both on and off the Upper Sioux Indian Reservation.

Waziyatawin earned a double major in history and American Indian studies at the University of Minnesota in 1992, then completed master's (1996) and doctoral degrees (2000) in history at Cornell University. Her Ph.D. thesis was based on an oral history project with her grandfather that she later published as Remember This! Dakota Decolonization and the Eli Taylor Narratives.

In 1998, Waziyatawin's eight-year-old daughter came home from school crying after her teacher had read Laura Ingalls Wilder's Little House on the Prairie in her elementary school class. In the book, a character says "The only good Indian is a dead Indian." Like other Indigenous educators such as Debbie Reese, who has written that "Little House" contains "derogatory and inaccurate information about Native people," Waziyatawin agreed that Wilder portrayed Native Americans as less than human, employing negative stereotypes. After the incident, Waziyatawin spent months trying to convince the school to drop Wilder's books from the curriculum but was unsuccessful.

In 2007, she legally changed her name from Angela Cavender Wilson to Waziyatawin, a name an elder gave her as a child and which means "woman of the north".

== Academic career ==
Waziyatawin earned tenure at Arizona State University and taught there until 2007. She edited her first book, Indigenizing the Academy: Transforming Scholarship and Empowering Communities, in 2004 with Devon Abbott Mihesuah. In 2005, she edited For Indigenous Eyes Only: A Decolonization Handbook with Michael Yellow Bird. The book compiles essays from eight Indigenous American academics. In 2008, she joined the Indigenous Governance Program at the University of Victoria as a Canada Research Chair in Indigenous Peoples, saying she was interested in the program's commitment to Indigenous liberation and social action.

Waziyatawin is recognized as a leading Indigenous intellectual. Her research interests include Indigenous women's roles in resisting colonialism, recovering Indigenous knowledge, and truth-telling as part of restorative justice. Waziyatawin is the author or editor of six books about Dakota history, Indigenous resistance, and decolonizing strategies. She founded Oyate Nipi Kte, a non-profit organization dedicated to "the recovery of Dakota traditional knowledge, sustainable ways of being, and Dakota liberation."

== Activism ==
As an activist, Waziyatawin gained public attention in 2007 when she was arrested multiple times while protesting Minnesota's sesquicentennial celebration. The protests aimed to raise awareness of broken treaties and colonial violence, including the hanging of 38 Dakota men during the Dakota War of 1862 (the largest mass execution in American history).

In 2010, the Winona Post published a letter from a student who had attended a lecture Waziyatawin had given at Winona State University. The student said Waziyatawin had incited violence against white people, calling her position "terrorism". In response, she told CBC News, "my position is that I don't call for violence outright but my recommendation does not preclude the use of violence for Indigenous self-defence — the defence of our populations or defence of our land base... Never have I advocated violence against white settlers." Waziyatawin said she was subsequently contacted by the FBI, but they later closed the case.

Waziyatawin has drawn connections between the Israeli-Palestinian conflict and settler colonialism in North America. In 2011, she travelled to Palestine with a group of Indigenous and women of color scholars and artists including Angela Davis, Chandra Talpade Mohanty, and Ayoka Chenzira. Afterwards, the group published a statement endorsing the Boycott, Divestment and Sanctions (BDS) movement.

== Personal life ==
Waziyatawin is married to Scott Wilson. She splits her time between Minnesota and Victoria, British Columbia in Coast Salish territories.

== Bibliography ==
- Indigenizing the Academy: Transforming Scholarship and Empowering Communities, Lincoln: University of Nebraska Press, 2004. ISBN 978-0-8032-0416-4
- For Indigenous Eyes Only: A Decolonization Handbook, Santa Fe: School for Advanced Research Press, 2005. ISBN 978-1-934691-93-9
- Remember This! Dakota Decolonization and the Eli Taylor Narratives, Lincoln: University of Nebraska Press, 2005. ISBN 978-0-8032-9844-6
- In the Footsteps of Our Ancestors: The Dakota Commemorative Marches of the 21st Century, St. Paul: Living Justice Press, 2006. ISBN 978-0-9721886-2-3
- What Does Justice Look Like? The Struggle for Liberation in Dakota Homeland, St. Paul: Living Justice Press, 2008. ISBN 978-0-9721886-5-4
