= Briceida Cuevas =

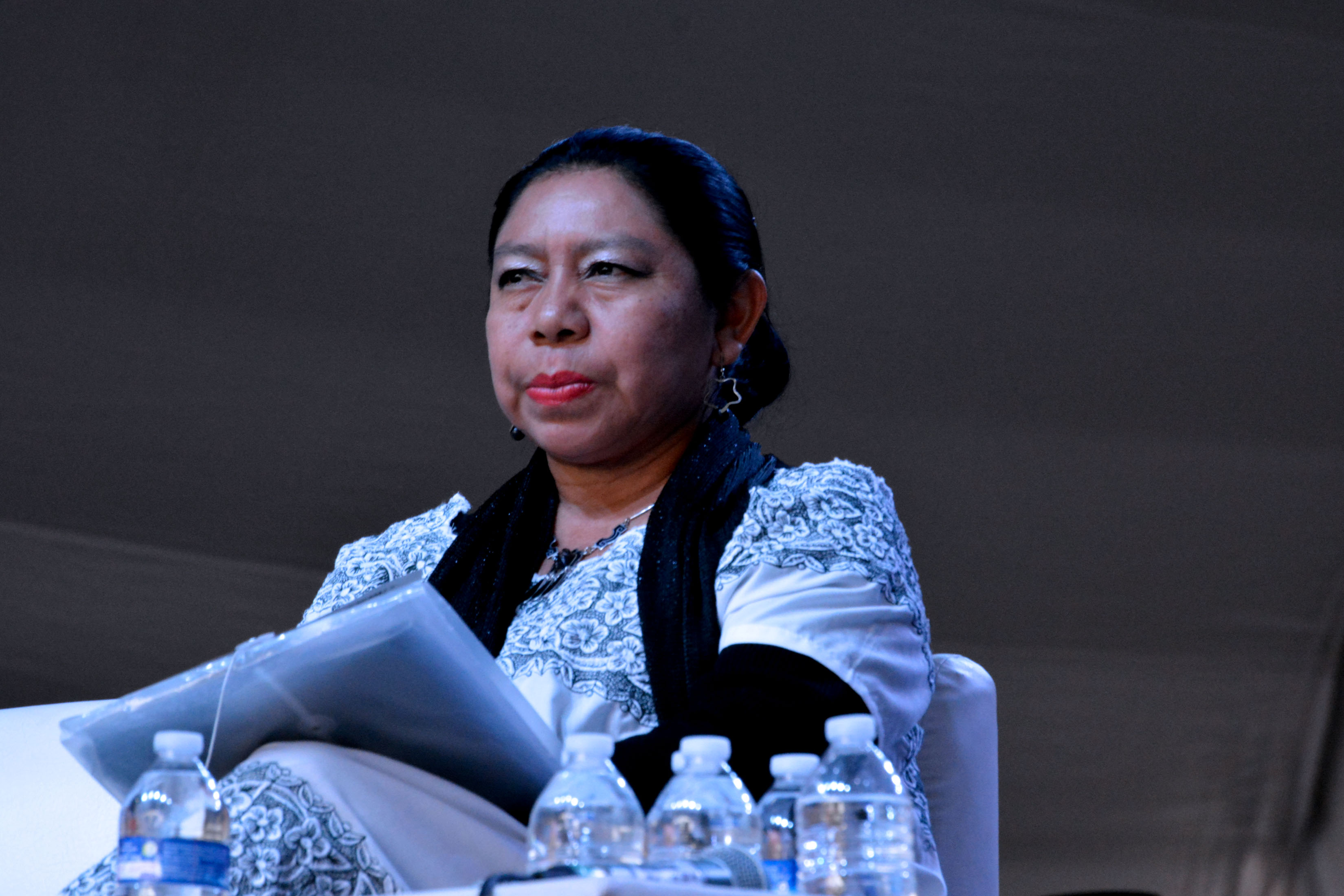
- Cuevas at the IV Fiesta de las Culturas Indígenas, 9 September 2017
- Born: July 12, 1969 (age 56); Tepakán, Calkiní, Mexico
- Other names: Briceida Cuevas Cob
- Occupation: Poet

Briceida Cuevas, also known as Briceida Cuevas Cob (born Tepakán, Calkiní, Campeche, Mexico, July 12, 1969) is a Mayan poet. She writes poems about everyday life in Yucatec Maya, many of which have been translated into Spanish, French and English. She is a member of Escritores en Lenguas Indigenas A.C., and a corresponding member of the Academia Mexicana de la Lengua.

== Selected works ==
- Flor y canto: cinco poetas indígenas del sur, INI/UNESCO, Tabasco, 1993.
- In pákat yétel júntul t'el: Tumbén Ikʼtʼanil ich Mayaʼ Tʼan (Poesía contemporánea en lengua maya), España, 1994.
- U yokʼol auat pekʼ (El quejido del perro en su existencia), Casa Internacional del Escritor, Quintana Roo, 1995.
- Jeʼ bix kʼin (Como el sol), 1998.
- Las lenguas de América. Recital de poesía, UNAM, La Pluralidad Cultural en México, 2005.
- Voci di Antiche Radici, dieci poeti indigeni del Méssico, Trieste, Italia, 2005.
- Tiʼ u billil in nookʼ /Del dobladillo de mi ropa, 2008.
- U t'íibta'al cháak : u múuch ts'íibil ik'il t'aano'ob yéetel tsikbalo'ob ich Maya yétel kaselan = Escribiendo la lluvia : antología literaria en lengua maya-español. Campeche, 2012.
- Lenguas de Mexico: Maya (audio poetry reading by Briceida Cuevas Cob), 2019.

== Selected works translated into English ==
- Four poems by Briceida Cuevas Cob (from U yok’ol auat pek’ ti kuxtal pek’, [The growl of the dog in its existence]
- Two Poems [Kite and Owl]
- School
