= Peter Blue Cloud =

Canadian writer (1933–2011)

Peter Blue Cloud (Aroniawenrate) (1933 – 2011) was a Kahnawakeronon poet, and folklorist.

== Early life ==
He was born June 10, 1933, of the Turtle Clan of the Mohawk Nation on the Caughnawaga Reserve in Kahnawake, Quebec, Canada. He was previously associated with the journal Akwesasne Notes and the journal Indian Magazine.

His Christian name was Peter Williams but he went by Peter Blue Cloud. The name Aroniawenrate as a nickname has been translated in English as "Stepping across the Blue Sky" or "Climbing up toward the Blue Sky". Peter Blue Cloud had pen names of Coyote 2, Owl's Child, Turtle's Son, and Kaienwaktatsie.

Blue Cloud was born in Kahnawake, Mohawk Territory (Quebec), where he attended school and was raised with the Mohawk language. The family moved to Buffalo, New York, for a while before returning to Kahnawake. He was educated at grammar school on the reserve and in Buffalo. He later learned English and French. He was a lifelong avid reader and began writing poems as a teenager.

At an early age, Blue Cloud was influenced by European and American traditions. His grandfather was a school teacher at Kahnawake, exposed to the art of storytelling through the plays of William Shakespeare and the tales of Haudenosaunee. These concepts were shown throughout his work.

He became an ironworker in his teens, working in various cities in the American West. In the late 1950s, he traveled to California, where he was employed as an ironworker in the Bay Area. After quitting, he worked as a logger with the Haida people in the Queen Charlotte Islands of British Columbia, as a ranch hand in the vicinity of Susanville, California, and doing archaeological field work with the Paiute people of Pyramid Lake, Nevada. He lived for some time at the Maidu Bear Dance grounds near Janesville, California, where he absorbed the stories and teachings of Maidu elders, and where some of his first creations as a carver and sculptor emerged. Overall the jobs he worked were jobs as a carpenter, logger, ironworker, and as a woodcarver.

== Career ==
Blue Cloud was very concerned about pantribal awareness and indigenous rights. His work stood as a symbol of Native rights in opposition to European colonization. The corrupted colonizing power by the reclamation did not go unheard.

Moving back to the Bay Area, he discovered the beat poetry and folk music scenes, and the social and political upheaval of the 1960s. There he continued to develop his talents as a poet, sculptor, carver and painter, collaborated with other Native artists and writers, and participated in art exhibitions.

While an artist in many genres, Blue Cloud is most known for his writing. He published several books of poetry and his poems appear in numerous anthologies and journals. He won the American Book Award for Back Then Tomorrow in 1981. He was noted for combining Native American mythology with contemporary issues, most especially the character of Coyote, the trickster who figured prominently in his stories and poems.

In the city or country, Blue Cloud loved to walk, was a keen observer of events both natural and political, and incorporated them into his writings. As it did for so many Native people, the occupation of Alcatraz Island from 1969 to 1971 sparked his interest in the fight for the rights of Native Americans. He lived on the island for a while, and supported the occupation and similar events in California and the Northwest by chronicling them in various publications.

Blue Cloud moved to the Sierra Nevada foothills near Nevada City for several years in the 1970s–80s, where he continued to write, carve and paint, while also working as a carpenter. There he met guitarist Rex Richardson, and toured across the U.S. in 1979 with Richardson, who set his poems to music. Several recordings were released as a result of the collaboration.

Blue Cloud returned to the East Coast to work for the national Native journal Akwesasne Notes (Mohawk territory, Akwesasne/New York) as a writer/editor first in 1975–1976, and again from 1983–1985. He returned to Kahnawake in 1986, where he briefly published his own newspaper, the Kariwakoroks, before writing a column for The Eastern Door newspaper from 1992 to 2006.

Lorna Wilkes-Ruebelmann is a freelance consultant in Sheridan, Wyoming, who reviewed Blue Cloud's work. She said that the imagery of indigenous Americans and the language he uses represents the past and the present simultaneously. His images are of quiet mountaintops and country trails that contrast with New York City's high steel construction and freeways.

== Death ==
Blue Cloud died in Montreal on April 27, 2011. Blue Cloud was cremated immediately after his death as per his wishes and his ashes will be spread in Modoc country in Northern California where the Modoc warriors fought and died.

== Awards ==
- 1981 – American Book Award, before Columbus Foundation

== Works ==
- "Coyote, Coyote, Please Tell Me" poem
- "An Arrangement" poem
- "Coyote makes First People" poem
- "Sketches in Winter, With Crows" poem (1984)
- "Clans of Many Nations" selected poems (1969–1994)
- "Back then tomorrow" short story (1978)
- "Tomorrow" poem
- "Alcatraz Visions" poem
- "Thunderman" poem
- "First Brother" poem
- "Alcatraz" poem
- "White Corn Sister" play (1979)
- "Elderberry Flute Song; Contemporary Coyote Tales" (1982)
- "Other Side of Nowhere: Contemporary Coyote Tales" (1990)
- "Badger's Son", Haven Community
- Alcatraz is not an island, Wingbow Press (1972)
- Turtle, bear and wolf, Akwesasne Notes (1976)
- Back then tomorrow, Brunswick, Maine : Blackberry Press (1978)
- The paranoid foothills: a work of fiction, Blackberry (1981)
- Clans of many nations : selected poems, 1969-1994. Fredonia, N.Y.: White Pine Press. 1995. ISBN 1-877727-47-4.
- Crazy Horse Monument (1995)
- Elderberry flute song : contemporary coyote tales. Buffalo, New York: White Pine Press. 1989. ISBN 0-934834-92-X.
- The other side of nowhere : contemporary coyote tales. Fredonia, N.Y.: White Pine Press. 1990. ISBN 1-877727-00-8.
- Sketches in winter, with crows. New York, NY: Strawberry Press. 1984. ISBN 0-936574-11-9.
- White corn sister. New York: Strawberry Press. 1979. ISBN 978-0-936574-02-8.

=== Anthologies ===
- Jeannette C. Armstrong; Lalage Grauer, eds. (2001). "Alcatraz". Native poetry in Canada: a contemporary anthology. Broadview Press. ISBN 978-1-55111-200-8.
- Geary Hobson, ed. (1981). The Remembered earth: an anthology of contemporary Native American literature. UNM Press. ISBN 978-0-8263-0568-8.
- Thomas King, ed. (1990). "Weaver Spider's Web". All my relations: an anthology of contemporary Canadian native fiction. Random House, Inc. ISBN 978-0-7710-6706-8.
