= Misión Chaqueña =

Coordinates: 23°15′S 63°43′W

- Municipality and village
- Interactive map of Misión Chaqueña
- Country: Argentina
- Province: Salta Province
- Time zone: UTC−3 (ART)

Misión Chaqueña is a village and rural municipality in Salta Province in northwestern Argentina.
