= María Clara Sharupi Jua =

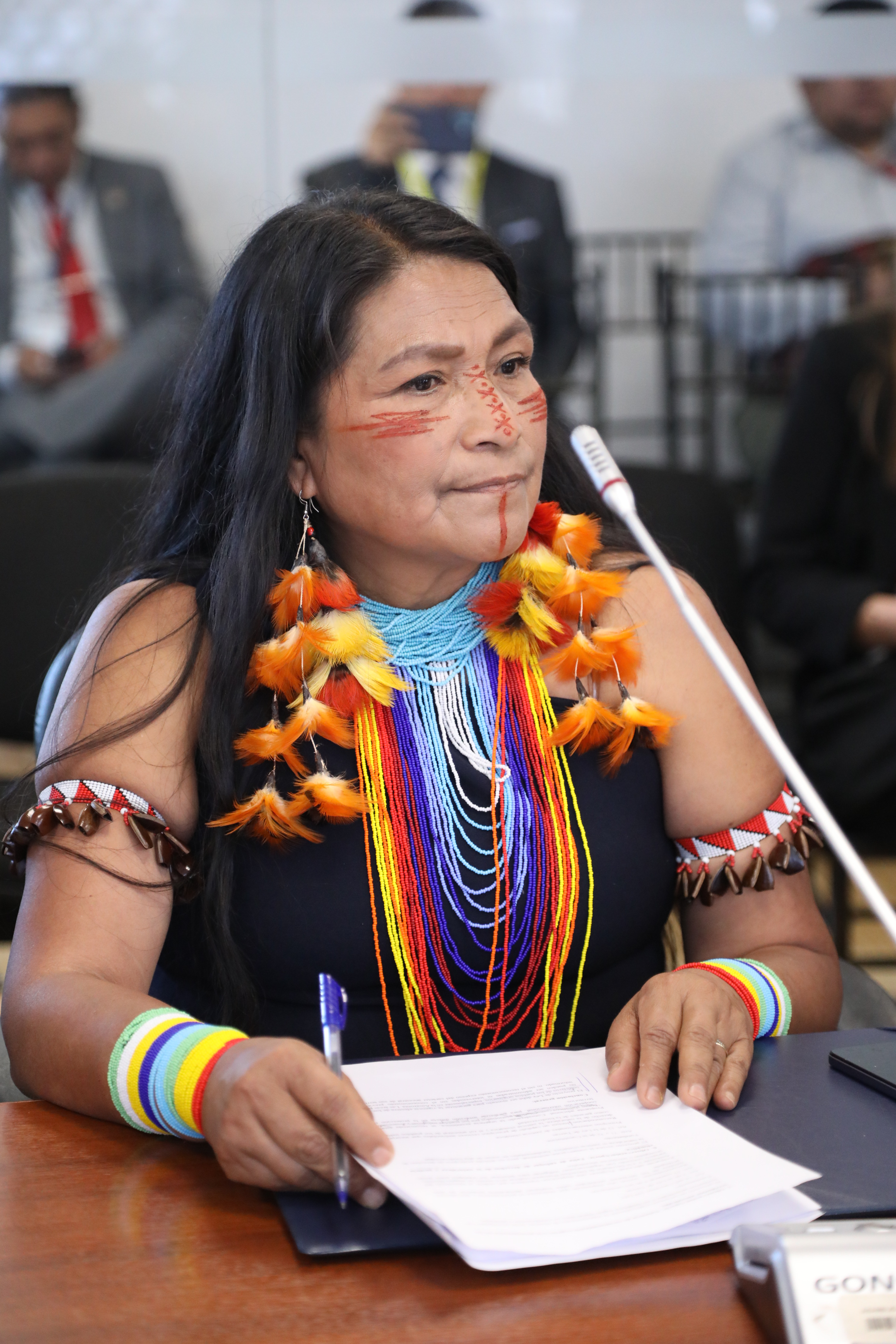
- Jua in 2025
- Born: 1964 (age 61–62); Sevilla Don Bosco, Morona-Santiago Province, Ecuador
- Citizenship: Ecuadorian
- Education: Politecnica Salesiana University
- Known for: Radio and television presenter who writes in the Shuar language

María Clara Sharupi Jua (born 1964) is an Ecuadorian translator, poet, and radio and television presenter who writes in the Shuar language, an indigenous language of the Ecuadorian Amazon basin.

== Life ==
María Clara Sharupi Jua is a native of the Amazon rainforest's Shuar Nation, born in Sevilla Don Bosco in Ecuador's Morona-Santiago Province. She grew up in the forest, working to help grow food for her family. She then attended Politecnica Salesiana University, where she studied electrical engineering.

She writes poetry in Shuar, her native language, while simultaneously translating it into Spanish with the goal of attracting a wider readership. She also modifies the writing system of her ancestral language, adapting it to the Latin alphabet.

Sharupi Jua's poetry is meant to serve as a reflection of the forest and to share her ancestral stories, as well as the stories of her community today. She is a co-author of the book Amanece en nuestras vidas, and her other works include the book of poetry Tarimiat, written in Shuar, Spanish, and English.

In addition, Sharupi Jua is a translator and a presenter in both Shuar and Spanish on radio and TV. She served on the translation team that edited the official Shuar translation of the Ecuadorian Constitution.

In 2011 she participated in the Quito International Book Festival, and in 2012 she participated in the Medellín International Poetry Festival. In 2023, her work was included in the anthology Daughters of Latin America: An International Anthology of Writing by Latine Women, and in 2025 she traveled to the United States to discuss her contribution. She lives in Quito, where she has also worked on indigenous issues for the Ministry of Foreign Affairs and Migration.

She was recognized by the Andean Community for her work to defend and preserve the Shuar language through her poetry.
