= Tom Whitecloud =

American Chippewa writer & medical doctor (1914-1972)

Thomas St. Germain Whitecloud II (8 October 1914 – 1972) was a Chippewa writer and medical doctor. One of the founding members of the Association of American Indian Physicians, he innovated several techniques in spine surgery.

== Biography ==
He was born in New York City, October 8, 1914. His mother was Euro-American and his father, Thomas S. Whitecloud, was Chippewa and a graduate of the Yale Law School. When the Whiteclouds divorced, and Thomas's father returned to the Lac Du Flambeau Reservation in Wisconsin, to remarry and raise a family, Thomas St. Germain Whitecloud remained with his mother, but he seems to have spent time on the reservation as well.

The younger Whitecloud encountered difficult times growing up. He was in and out of public schools as well as federal Indian schools in Albuquerque, Chilocco, and Santa Fe. He made an unsuccessful attempt at college studies at the University of New Mexico but finally settled down to serious study at the University of Redlands, where he also met and married Barbara Ibanez. Meanwhile, during his youth, he had been a farm worker, truck driver, mechanic, handyman, and boxer, among others.but his father divorced and remarried, and he was raised on the Lac du Flambeau Indian Reservation near Woodruff, Wisconsin. Whitecloud studied in New Mexico and California, receiving his degree in medicine from Tulane University. Throughout his life, he worked with institutions like the Department of Health, Education, and Welfare to further Indian causes. He lived in Louisiana and Texas, and was a consultant for the Texas Commission on Alcoholism and Drug Abuse for Indians at the time of his death in 1972.

"Blue Winds Dancing" (1938), Whitecloud's most famous story, is about a young man's struggle to exist in ancient and modern America. It consists of a lyrical account of his journey home, and is anthologized in the Heath Anthology of American Literature. The story stands out in contemporary literature for its acceptance, lyrical prose, vivid imagery, and social observations. Whitecloud is cited as the author of a prayer to the Father, the Creator, which emphasized Indigenous spirituality in relation to nature.
