= Women in positions of power =

Women in positions of power are women who hold an occupation that gives them great authority, influence, and/or responsibility in government or in businesses. Historically, power has been distributed unequally. Power and powerful positions have most often been associated with men as opposed to women. As gender equality increases, men still hold more power, including in politics and athletics.

Accurate and proportional representation of women in social systems has been shown to be important to the long-lasting success of the human race and existence.

== Position of power ==
Occupational power refers to power over coworkers in the field. Positions of power can exist in almost any setting (such as librarianship, where the concept of power is discussed in the broader health literature and the occupational therapy literature from three perspectives), from small scale, unofficial groups or clubs all the way to the obvious leaders of nations or CEOs of companies These more official situations are found in many areas, such as government, industry and business, science and academia, the media, the Non Governmental Organizations, and many other sectors in the society.

== Gender as a factor ==
Positions of power and gender are very intertwined. As one study pointed out, "Power differences frequently underlie what appear to be gender differences in knowledge, behavior; attitude as society is currently configured, power and gender are never independent". As such, gender relates to power in the different ways power is acquired, used, and manifested. A 1988 journal article summarizes this relation between gender and power: "the idea that women and men differ in power motivation is reinforced by history and culture. In the history of the west, certainly, women have had less access to most forms of power than have men. Many people believe that men are interested in power and getting power while women are not. Others hold that men and women differ in the ways that they establish, maintain and express power". Additionally, studies have shown that increasing women's participation in leadership positions decreases corruption, as "women are less involved in bribery, and are less likely to condone bribe taking". A study on gender and corruption from 2000 also found that "cross-country data show that corruption is less severe where women hold a larger share of parliamentary seats and senior positions in the government bureaucracy, and comprise a larger share of the labor force".

== Other factors ==
In addition to the male-female split in the distribution of positions of power, many other factors play a role in who has power. Race, class, sexuality, age, and other factors all play a significant part in who is in control. These factors play in especially when coupled with the gender difference: research from the Journal of the National Association of Social Workers has found that the "double burden of racism and sexism exacts a toll on their mental health and restricts their opportunities". Additionally, according to another study, "the degree to which a system successfully includes women can indicate a propensity for the system to include other disenfranchised minorities".

== Traditional roles and stereotypes ==
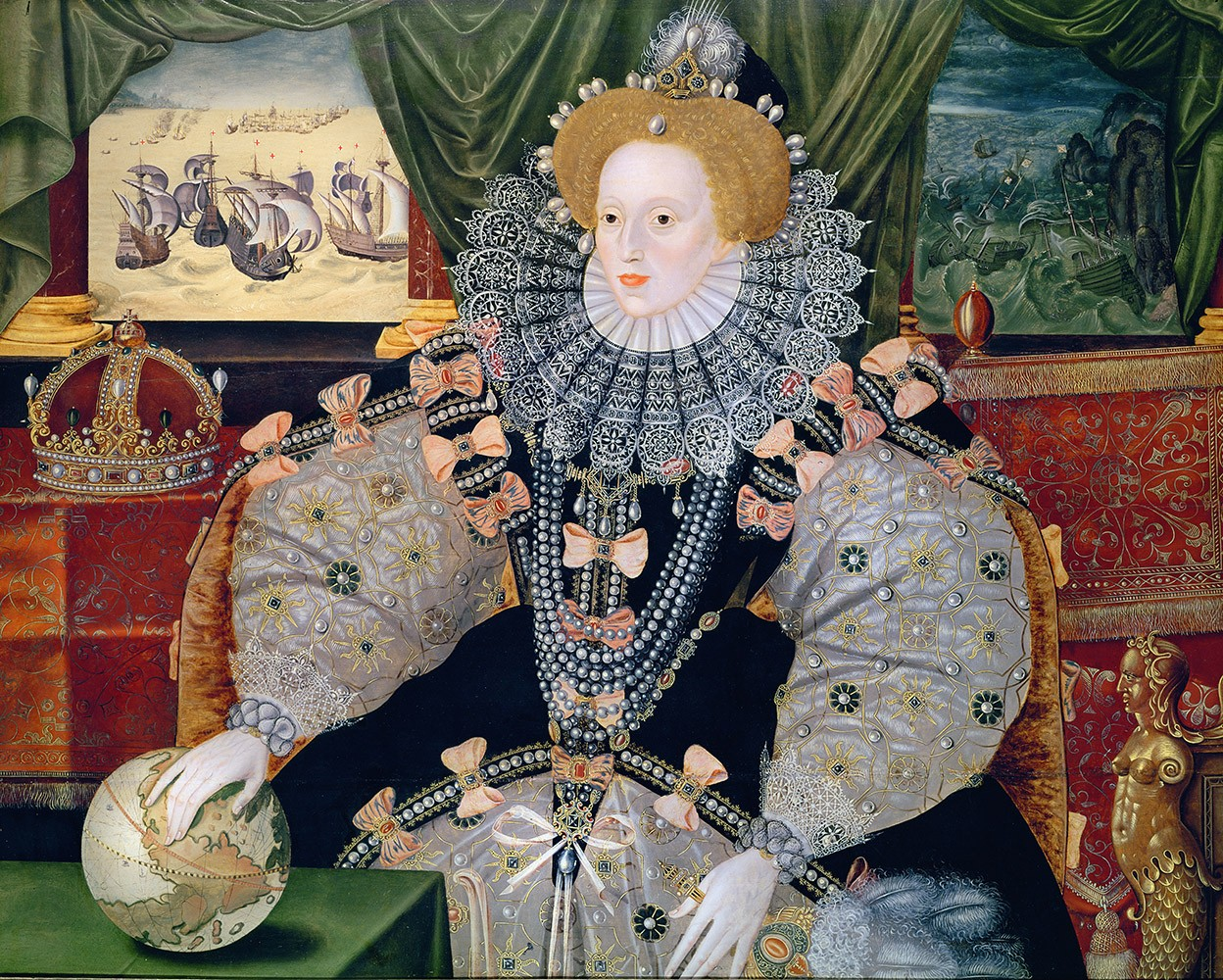
Armada Portrait of Elizabeth I who stated 'I know I have the body but of a weak and feeble woman; but I have the heart and stomach of a king, and of a king of England too.'

Traditional roles for men and women in most cultures have relegated women to working in the home primarily. This traditional role of fostering and nurturing others ensued from various sources, but the results are a decrease in the value of work done by women and a decreased ability to work outside the home. This is paired with the societal expectation of the woman to take care of the home and family and with that the lack of male support in the caretaking of the home. This all leads to the expectation that women have responsibilities in the home and often plays a part in occupational sexism.

Other traditional views of women relegate them to certain occupations. The view of women as caretakers of the family extends beyond the familial unit to others. Women have traditionally been seen as caretakers of both people and other beings and things. However, this caretaker occupation has most often been a subordinate one, under the direction of a superior, usually a man. The example of the vastly female-dominated nurse occupation, 95% women as of the 2000s, reflects this, as it is the doctors that ultimately are in charge and have the power in the nurse-doctor relationship.

Traditional stereotypes of women make them out to be much more emotional and irrational than men, and thus, less suited for many important jobs. However, it has been found that men and women don't differ in terms of rationality, and only in emotional expression, not actual emotions One survey based in South Africa found that "over 30 per cent ... are of the opinion that women are too emotional to be able to handle high level leadership positions"; evidently, stereotypes persist and still take effect.

Studies show that "it is common for stereotypical ideas about women's abilities to perform well in leadership positions to inform people's perceptions about women leaders".

== Government ==
Share of women in parliament, worldwide

For many years and in most regions of the globe, politics had not allowed women to play a significant role in government. Even in the early 1900s, politics were viewed almost exclusively as the domain of men. However, women's movements and culture-changing events such as World War II gradually increased women's rights and roles in politics. Many factors go into the degree of female participation in governments across the world. One 1999 study found: "[the] electoral system structure, left party government, the timing of women's suffrage, the share of women in professional occupations, and cultural attitudes toward the role of women in politics each play a role in accounting for variation in the degree of gender inequality in political representation around the world”. Even still, there are many other factors that play a serious role in female participation in government. There is a significant “perceived liability” to a party of having a female candidate for office, according to a 2005 study. Even today, no country in the world has 50% or higher female participation in a national legislature, and 73% of countries have less than 20% female participation.

There are multiple levels of power positions in the government from the local level to the national level. Accordingly, there are different degrees to which women partake in these different levels. For example, studies have found in India that "large scale membership of women in local councils" can be more effective in exerting influence, such as over crime rates, than "their presence in higher level leadership positions". However, it is important to have women at all levels of government to ensure the representation as well as enacting of women's interests.

=== Voting ===
Women were deprived of exercising political power in every country until granted the right to vote. After earning the right to vote, it often took decades for women to turn out to the polls in numbers proportional to their male counterparts. In the U.S. today, women are statistically more likely to vote than men, a pattern that occurs in certain countries, such as Scandinavian countries, while the opposite occurs in others, such as India. Scandinavian countries are also some of the countries with the greatest female representation in government positions. Exercising the right to vote is a reflection of the power women feel they have in their political systems.

Today, women are enfranchised in all countries with a legislature other than Saudi Arabia. A 2006 study demonstrated that “although women have the legal right to vote and stand for elections in almost every country of the world, cultural barriers to women’s use of their political rights, including family resistance and illiteracy, remain”.

=== Quotas ===
Many countries have instituted quotas dictating a minimum number of women to be given elected positions in governments. In general, the quota system has acted as a fast-track to incorporating greater female representation into the governing systems. Several countries, such as Rwanda, which have established quota systems successfully have even recently surpassed traditionally highly gender representative countries based on the quota requirements. However, there are still flaws to quota systems and there is some controversy over the effectiveness of representation, as some studies have found actual policy change to be limited.

=== International organizations ===
International bodies such as the UN have established goals for female representation in governing bodies. Thirty percent of elected position seats was recommended as the critical mass necessary to gain effective policy from female representation. However, even these international bodies that promote female empowerment on many scales themselves lack proportional gender representation. On Wikipedia's List of current permanent representatives to the United Nations, of the 192 representatives, only 32 are women, which is only 16.67% female, barely over half of what they recommend for governing bodies. Additionally, of these 32 countries represented by women, only three, the United States, Singapore, and Luxembourg, are considered core countries, making women-represented core countries only an even smaller percentage.

== Industry and business ==
Most top and high-power positions in businesses and companies are held by men, such as the case of Sweden. Women currently hold 4.4 percent of Fortune 500 CEO roles and 4.4 percent of Fortune 1000 CEO roles. Research has shown “a consistent difference favoring men in accessibility to, and utility of, resources for power”. Thus, business and industry worldwide still sees a harsh split between the genders in terms of who has control.

However, having women in leadership positions can be in the company's best interests. Studies have found that gender diversity in top-level boards means broader perspectives and opinions, which result in more comprehensive outcomes. A study on firms in Denmark found that “the proportion of women in top management jobs tends to have positive effects on firm performance, even after controlling for numerous characteristics of the firm and direction of causality”. Additionally, a 2004 study from Bottom Line found that: “Companies with the highest representation of women on their top management teams experienced better financial performance than companies with the lowest women’s representation”.

In order to try to achieve greater gender equality in workplace leadership positions, the European Union established a goal to have 40% women in non-executive board-member positions in publicly listed companies by 2020.

During the 1980s, many pushed for pay equality for women. Unfortunately, this did not lead to greater employment of women in higher roles. New tactics need to be enacted in order to give employers incentives to hire more women, specifically for management and executive roles. “Women make up less than 5% of CEOs at Fortune 500 companies, hold less than 25% of management roles, and just less than 19% of board roles globally.” While CEOs of companies are working toward creating more female employees as leaders, the root of the problem is often not addressed. Discrepancies often occur between qualities of leaders and qualities of women as leaders. Once women are respected and given credibility in the workplace, they will have the ability to occupy higher positions. “A significant body of research shows that for women, the subtle gender bias that persists in organizations and in society disrupts the learning cycle at the heart of becoming a leader.” Once this bias is rectified, women will be able to gain leadership positions in their companies and/or organizations.

=== The glass ceiling ===
In the workplace, both in the public and private sector, the opportunities available to women are trumped by a glass ceiling. The glass ceiling is a phenomenon in which women in the workplace, climb the corporate ladder with qualifications equal to those of their male counterparts only to find that they cannot proceed past a certain point due to gender stereotypes and their implications. These gender stereotypes create barriers for women trying to reach positions of power which is responsible for creating and influencing the glass ceiling effect. The glass ceiling most directly affects those women who spend many years working in an industry to build up achievements and a status of credibility in order to be considered for positions of power within the company or industry. Yet despite their competence, women are not offered top CEO positions because of their sex and existing stereotypes that say that women are not cut out to head such big responsibilities. However, when these women's achievements are ignored and their success halted because of ignorant stereotypes, they are not the only ones affected. Many young women entering the workforce often look up to these driven women and aspire to achieve many of the same dreams. Yet when these young women witness their mentors and idols failing to achieve their dreams because of gender inequality, a culture begins to develop amongst women where they do not feel worthy of power and struggle with self empowerment. This is an immense reason why a lot of women do not chase after positions of power because of a lack of self-worth brought on by gender stereotypes and inequalities.

The glass ceiling is continuing to affect women today, but with forced attention on gender equality, women will be able to break through this invisible ceiling and effect change in the corporate world. While companies are shifting toward greater gender diversity in the workplace, it is still necessary to identify and rectify why women are not gaining leadership positions, even though equal pay for equal work exists. Evidence shows that organizations that play an active management role in diversity in the workplace have positive results. Active management in diversity has led to pay equity, more flexible schedules, and equal access to advancement opportunities. Using innovation in the workplace and installing unconventional programs has landed success in employing more women.

== Academia ==
In academia as well, much remains to be accomplished in terms of gender equality. Many departments, especially those in Science, Technology, Engineering, and Mathematics (STEM) fields, are heavily male-dominated. In 1960, in the United States, women made up just 39 percent of those receiving a college degree. Today, women make up a majority of those seeking a bachelors degree.

Women achieve disproportionately less prestige and success in academia than their male counterparts. They are less likely to be tenured and to receive promotions to more influential or powerful positions. Women in academia also earn a lower income, on average, than their male counterparts, even when adjusted. While hiring of women in academic fields has been on a slight rise, it is mainly in entry-level occupations and not for high-level positions where women are most lacking. Integrating women more thoroughly into academia may be important to developing future gender equality as well as greater research outcomes. Highly disproportionate prestige and success outcomes in fields that are seen as being male-dominated may be a consequence of gender socialization that funnel women into specific fields, otherwise known as "care" fields, such as teaching.

== Example of success ==
According to the Pew Research Center, after extensive research, the key barrier for why women either are not advancing in their careers or are not being viewed as competitors for top positions in companies is because there are “many interruptions related to motherhood that may make it harder for women”. Forbes provides scenarios that even if women have full-time jobs, they are still the one responsible for any family dilemmas rather than men. David White argues that men during the 1960s, as implemented in his study, “being the sole provider for the family gave men a significant amount of power in their homes and contributed to feelings of male superiority”. Economics research states that culture can “transmit values and norms that last for centuries and even millennia” and they have “nothing to substantiate them except handed-down beliefs”. This research indicates that one reason women are not advancing in top positions in businesses is because of gender norms that have perpetuated into the 20th century.

== Contemporary examples ==
=== Africa ===
Most countries in Africa leave women without easy avenues to powerful positions in any area. However, there are some exceptions, such as Rwanda, Senegal, and South Africa. After the Rwandan Civil War, women made up 60 to 70 percent of the population leading to a change in the governmental policies, stating that 30% of policy-making positions must be allocated to women. As of 2016, women make up 64% of seats in the lower house of Rwanda’s national legislature. This ranks Rwanda at No. 1 while the United States is ranked at No. 96. There are 49 women in the 80-seat lower house and 10 women in the 26-seat upper house. In addition, 9 of the 19 ministerial positions in the country, as of 2017. In both Senegal and South Africa, women hold more than 40% of parliamentary seats.

=== Nordic countries ===
Norway, Sweden, Finland, and other countries in Scandinavia have had long-established parliaments and have gone through a long, slow process of integrating women into power positions. As a result, Sweden is the country with the second highest rate of female participation in government, behind Rwanda. Norway got its first ever female foreign minister in 2017, Ine Eriksen Søreide, and with that women hold 3 of the top positions in the government including Prime Minister, Minister of Finance, and Minister of Foreign Affairs. Finland is far behind both Norway and Sweden, their political life not changing significantly over the years. Women do occupy the positions of Minister of Education (Sanni Grahn-Lassonen), Minister of Social Affairs and Health (Pirkko Mattila), and Minister of Transport and Communications (Anne Berner).

=== Middle East ===
The Middle East is home to some of the most female-oppressive countries, such as Saudi Arabia, where women are not allowed to vote. However, in some countries, especially more liberal ones such as the United Arab Emirates, many women are making progress toward greater power. There were Social and economic reforms beginning in the mid-nineteenth century that demanded that women play more of a role in the Middle East societies, at the beginning of these men were the ones who put these demands forward, but by the end of the nineteenth century, women were able to get more involved. The earliest organized women movements were developed in Turkey, Iran, and Egypt during the first ten years of the 20th century.

During the Egyptian nationalist uprising against Britain, between 1919 and 1922 women of all classes joined in street demonstrations, however, upper-class women still seemed to have the most power over the underclass by confronting the British soldiers and dressed crowds. The Egyptian Feminist Union was created in 1924 because most male politicians would not be willing to campaign for women's demands and practical issues like improvements to accessing education, greater awareness of health issues that affect women, and minor legal changes including the minimum marriage age. Over 20 years the Union worked hard against the government and finally achieving these practical successes but only on limited bases. In the late 1940s new political changes shook Egypt with demanding the Britain drop from the Suez Canal zone and challenges the corrupt monarchy, Women were still active in politics but the union had gotten more demanding by this time.

Women seem to be less active in formal politics and more active in informal or street politics which caused it to grow. In weaker states like Lebanon, street politics have more of an impact and are taken more seriously than in stronger states like Iran. Egyptian and Iranian women have been more emotionally involved in political movements, in Palestine, the women are to be secondary and supportive and not in leadership positions. Meanwhile, the Palestinian national movement allowed women to participate in street politics that is a national context and legitimacy, however, this diluted women’s commitment greatly because the women had to be careful to not challenge the patriarch. The informal participation is gender-linked but also class linked, the middle or higher class might be less likely to participate in the street compared to the working class. The middle or higher class are more likely to be allowed to participate in formal organizations like political parties, women’s associations, philanthropic organizations, religious institutions, and social agencies.

Women use different strategies to participate in politics, like in Egypt and Iran women use the taunt, Iranian, Palestinian, and Sudanese women are in important emotional roles to help create solidarity. The women may pass along information to men, they could also persuade their men to join a faction and act as decoys. Women who chose to participate in politics get demonized, they get negatively sexually and politically labeled the degree women get labeled are by their class, family, and financial stability.

=== Latin America ===
In terms of leadership ratios, Latin America is one of the most progressive regions in the world when it comes to electing women. One-fourth of the legislators in Latin America are women; a higher ratio can only be found in Scandinavia. Latin America also has “more female heads of state than any other area of the world." The prime example of integration of women into powerful positions in Latin America is Argentina, the first country in the world to adopt a quota system, requiring 15% female participation in the electoral system in 1990.[17]

The presence of women in Argentine government can also be attributed to the Peronist Feminist Party, instituted by Juan Perón and led by his wife Eva. Following the campaigns of this party, 90% of Argentine women participated in the 1951 election, and seven women won positions in office.

However, women have not only been elected to small positions. The previous president of Chile, Michelle Bachelet, is one example. She served as president from 2006 to 2010 and was re-elected in 2013. During that three-year intermission, she became the first executive director of the United Nations Entity for Gender Equality and the Empowerment of Women. During her presidency, she has championed women's health and other rights and instituted several reforms to address these issues. Her presidency marked a change in the politics of Chile, as well as Latin America as a whole.

Other historical examples of female heads of state include Isabel Perón (Argentina, 1974-6), Violeta Chamorro (Nicaragua, 1990-7), Mireya Moscoso de Arias (Panama, 1999–2004), Cristina Fernández de Kirchner (Argentina, 2007–2015), Laura Chinchilla (Costa Rica, 2010–14), and Dilma Rousseff (Brazil, 2011–2016). Despite the high numbers of female politicians, little progress has been made on issues such as gender-based income inequality.

=== India ===
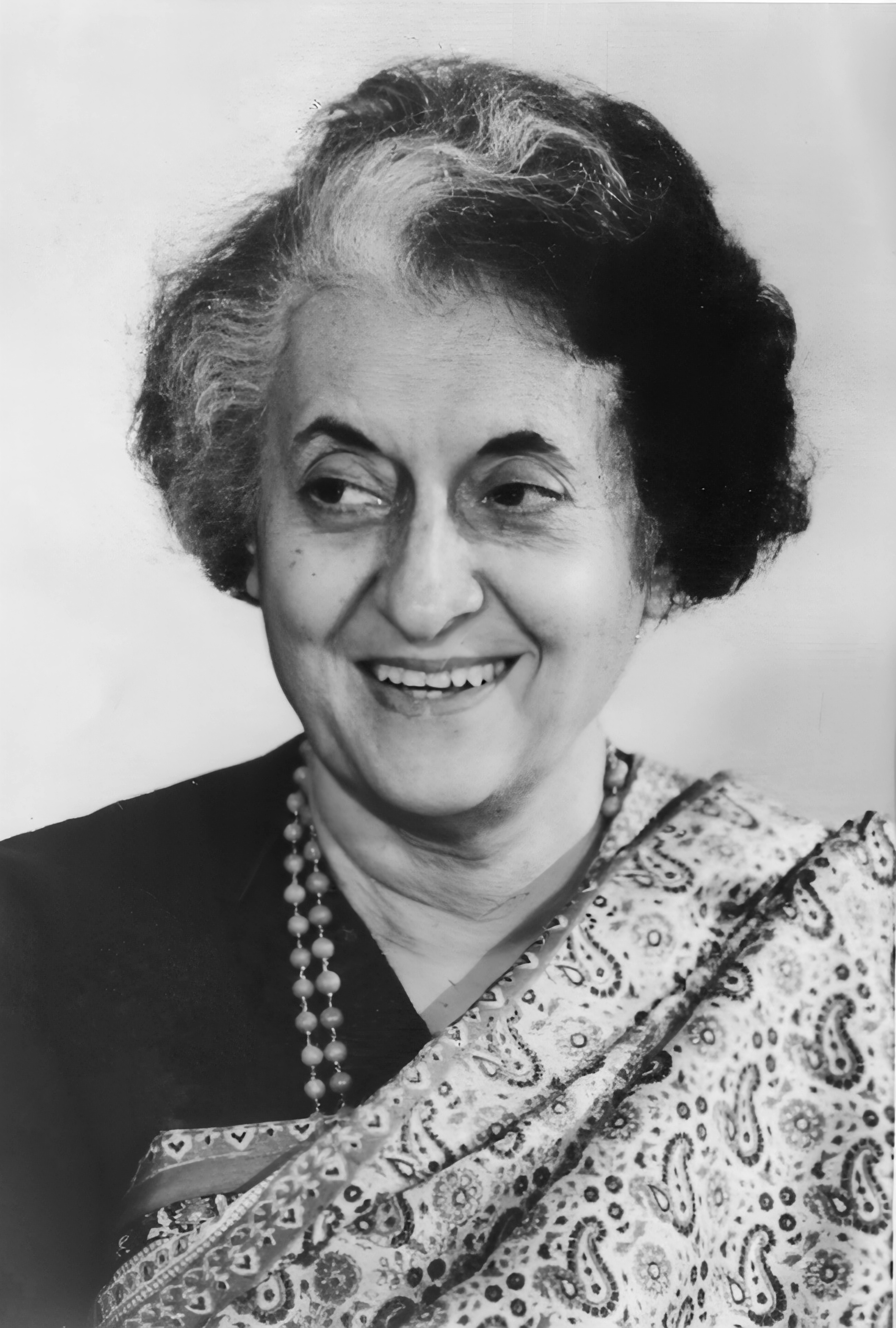
Indira Gandhi, India's first female prime minister

One of the highly significant things and provisions introduced by the new Companies Act of India is the mandatory inclusion of at least one woman director to the Board of every prescribed class of companies in India. This provision can be considered as revolutionary initiation by the Government of India, for the purposes of empowerment of women in the Indian Corporate world thereby strengthening and promoting contributions of women to the economic progress of the country.

Women in India have not been not greatly involved in communism, particularly poorer women. Some issues, though, have affected women more than men, therefore calling for women to be involved. One such case was a famine that struck Bengal, India in 1942-1943. This affected women because they had less access to food than men and therefore played many roles. One of the roles some women assumed was prostituting themselves or their daughters for food, thousands of poor women and girls going into brothels. Other women chose to fill a different role; a group including peasant women set up relief kitchens in the capital Calcutta by September 1943 that fed 1,100 people daily. This group also created a movement to force the government to lower the prices of rice and also to open ration shops. This caused 16 fair price shops to be opened. After this, communist women set up a women's organization similar to the All Women's India Conference, but one that would include more than just rich and educated women. The new organization was called the Mahila Atma Rashka Samiti (MARS). They ran a monthly journal called Gharey Baire. This group's activities working among women affected in the famine grew and the organization was largely successful.
