= Paulla Dove Jennings =

Native American writer

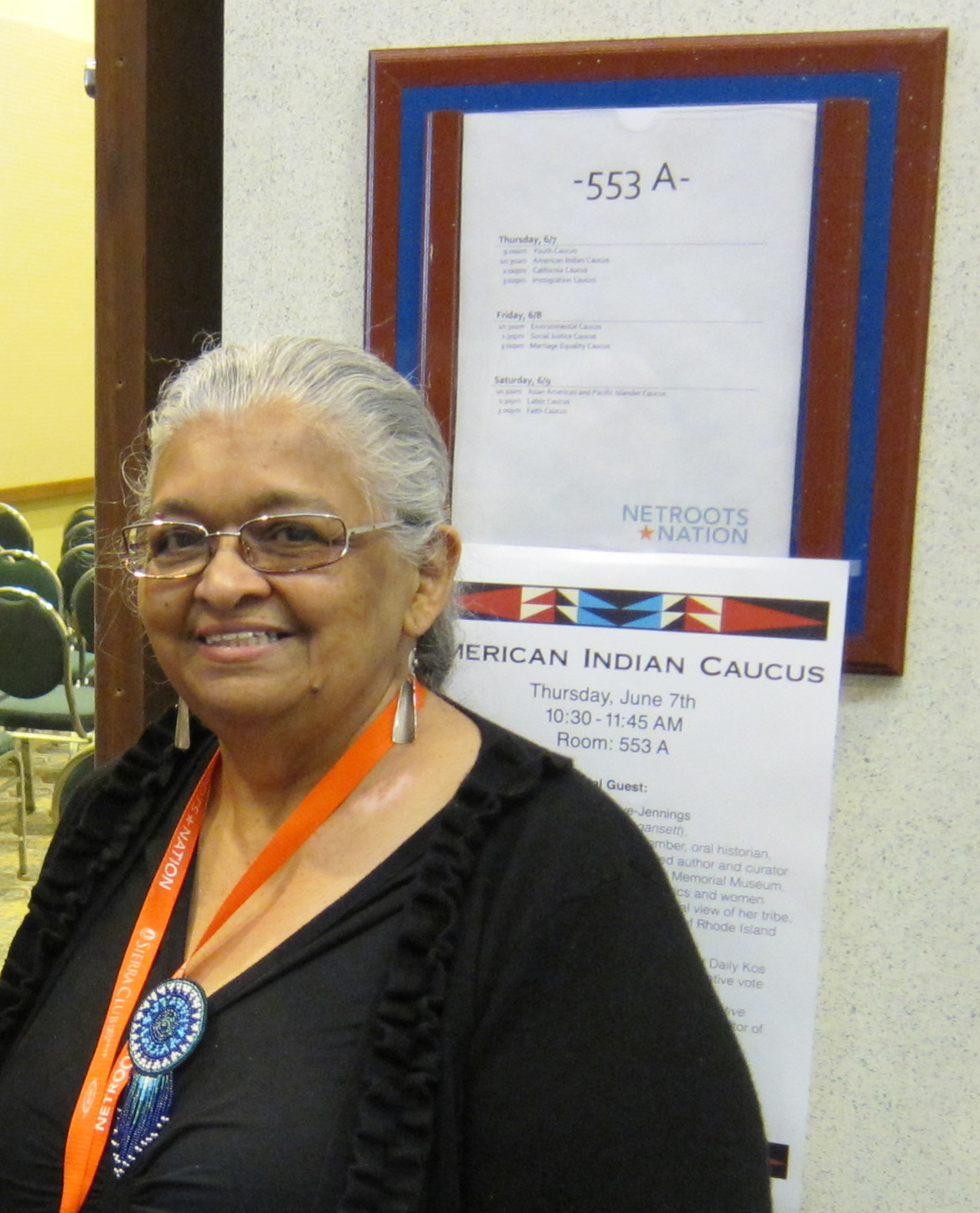
- Paulla Dove Jennings (2012)
- Born: 1940 (age 85–86); Providence, Rhode Island
- Citizenship: Narragansett Indian Tribe, American
- Education: Community College of Rhode Island
- Occupations: Professional story teller, educator and children’s book author, curator
- Employer(s): Boston Children's Museum, Tomaquag Indian Memorial Museum
- Known for: Book, Strawberry Thanksgiving, lawsuit regarding a raid on a tribal smoke shop

Paulla Dove Jennings is a Narragansett storyteller, educator, and children's book author.

== Background ==
Paulla Dove Jennings was born in 1940 in Providence, Rhode Island. Her parents are Eleanor and Ferris Dove, and her family is Narragansett with Niantic ancestry. Jennings is an enrolled member of the Narragansett Indian Tribe and belongs to the Turtle Clan.

Jennings' father was a Narragansett war chief and graduated from Bacone College. He and his wife ran a popular restaurant and trading post for many years called Dovecrest. The site later became a school teaching a curriculum of Native American history and values. Jennings was one of four children, she learned her tribal and family history from her grandmother.

== Career ==
Jennings also obtained a degree from the Community College of Rhode Island and has worked as a curator for both the Boston Children's Museum and the Tomaquag Indian Memorial Museum in Exeter, Rhode Island. She has performed as a storyteller at the National Museum of the American Indian in Washington, D.C. In 2010, Jennings served as the Tribal Historian in Residence for the certificate program in Native American Studies at the UMASS Amherst.

In addition to her work as an educator and storyteller, Jennings has been politically active in her tribe. She has served on her tribal council, and in 2007 ran an unsuccessful campaign for the position of chief sachem. She and her son Adam were among the plaintiffs in a lawsuit against Rhode Island State Police, which in July 2003 raided a tribal smoke shop. The raid resulted in eight arrests and eight injured, including Jennings's son. Jennings herself has spoken publicly about the case as an infringement on Narragansett tribal sovereignty.

== Strawberry Thanksgiving ==
Strawberry Thanksgiving was written for the Multicultural Celebrations at the Boston Children's Museum, part of a series of books designed to educate children about different cultures. Written by Jennings and illustrated by Ramona Peters, the book tells how a young boy, Adam, learns to forgive his sister by hearing his grandmother tell the story of Strawberry Thanksgiving.
