= Hesquiaht =

Nuu-chah-nulth group on Vancouver Island

The Hesquiaht are one of the Nuu-chah-nulth peoples of the West Coast of Vancouver Island, British Columbia, Canada. Today the Hesquiaht are governed mostly by the Hesquiaht First Nation band government, though some are in the Tla-O-Qui-Aht First Nations, which also includes the Clayoquot and some of the Ahousaht.

== Traditional foods ==
The Hesquiaht traditionally use the berries of Vaccinium myrtilloides to make pies and preserves. They also use the berries of Vaccinium vitis-idaea ssp as food.

== See also ==
- Hesquiaht First Nation
- Hesquiat Peninsula
