= History of Native Americans in the United States =

The history of Native Americans in the United States began thousands of years ago with the settlement of the Americas by the Paleo-Indians. The Eurasian migration to the Americas occurred over a land bridge between Siberia and Alaska, as early humans spread southward and eastward, forming distinct cultures. Archaeological evidence suggests that some of the earliest recognized inhabitants classified as Paleo-Indians, spread throughout the Americas, diversifying into numerous culturally distinct nations. Major Paleo-Indian cultures included the Clovis and Folsom traditions, identified through unique spear points and large-game hunting methods, especially during the Lithic stage.

Around 3000 BCE, as the climate stabilized, new cultural periods like the Archaic stage arose, during which hunter-gatherer communities developed complex societies across North America. The Mound Builders created large earthworks, such as at Watson Brake and Poverty Point, which date to 3500 BCE and 2200 BCE, respectively, indicating early social and organizational complexity. By 1000 BCE, Native societies in the Woodland period developed advanced social structures and trade networks, with the Hopewell tradition connecting the Eastern Woodlands to the Great Lakes and the Gulf of Mexico. This period led to the Mississippian culture, with large urban centers like Cahokia—a city with complex mounds and a population exceeding 20,000 by 1250 CE. From the 15th century onward, European contact drastically reshaped the Americas. Explorers and settlers introduced diseases, causing massive Indigenous population declines, and engaged in violent conflicts with Native groups. By the 19th century, westward U.S. expansion, rationalized by Manifest destiny, pressured tribes into forced relocations like the Trail of Tears, which decimated communities and redefined Native territories. Despite resistance in events like the Sioux Uprising and Battle of Little Bighorn, Native American lands continued to be reduced through policies like the Indian Removal Act of 1830 and later the Dawes Act, which undermined communal landholding.

In the 20th century, Native Americans served in significant numbers during World War II, marking a turning point for Indigenous visibility and involvement in broader American society. Post-war, Native activism grew, with movements such as the American Indian Movement (AIM) drawing attention to Indigenous rights. Landmark legislation like the Indian Self-Determination and Education Assistance Act of 1975 recognized tribal autonomy, leading to the establishment of Native-run schools and economic initiatives. By the 21st century, Native Americans had achieved increased control over tribal lands and resources, although many communities continue to grapple with the legacy of displacement and economic challenges. Urban migration has also grown, with over 70% of Native Americans residing in cities by 2012, navigating issues of cultural preservation and discrimination. Continuing legal and social efforts address these concerns, building on centuries of resilience and adaptation that characterize Indigenous history across the Americas.

== Migration to the continent and Lithic stage ==
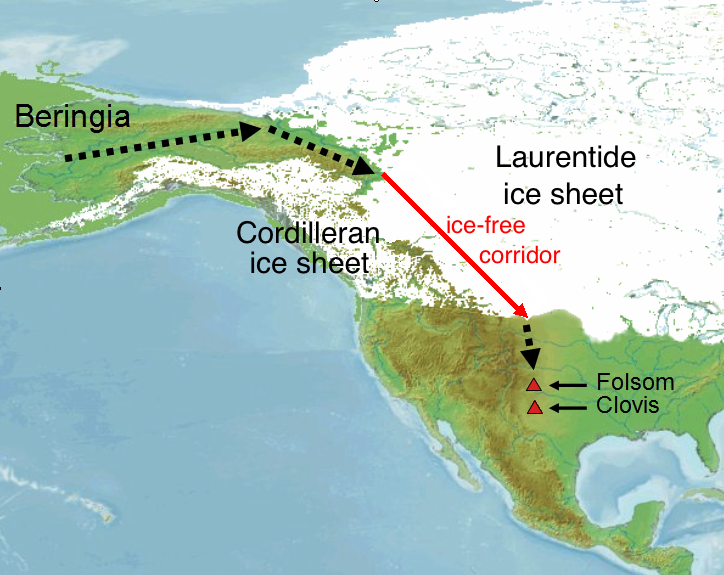
This map shows the approximate location of the ice-free corridor and specific Paleoindian sites (Clovis theory).

According to the most generally accepted theory of the settlement of the Americas, migrations of humans from Eurasia to the Americas took place via Beringia, a land bridge which connected the two continents across what is now the Bering Strait. The number and composition of the successive migrations is still being debated. Falling sea levels associated with an intensive period of Quaternary glaciation created the Bering land bridge that joined Siberia to Alaska about 60–25,000 years ago. The latest this migration could have taken place is 12,000 years ago; the earliest remains undetermined. The archaeological periods used are the classifications of archaeological periods and cultures established in Gordon Willey and Philip Phillips' 1958 book Method and Theory in American Archaeology which divided the archaeological record in the Americas into five phases; see Archaeology of the Americas.

=== Paleo-India or Lithic stage ===
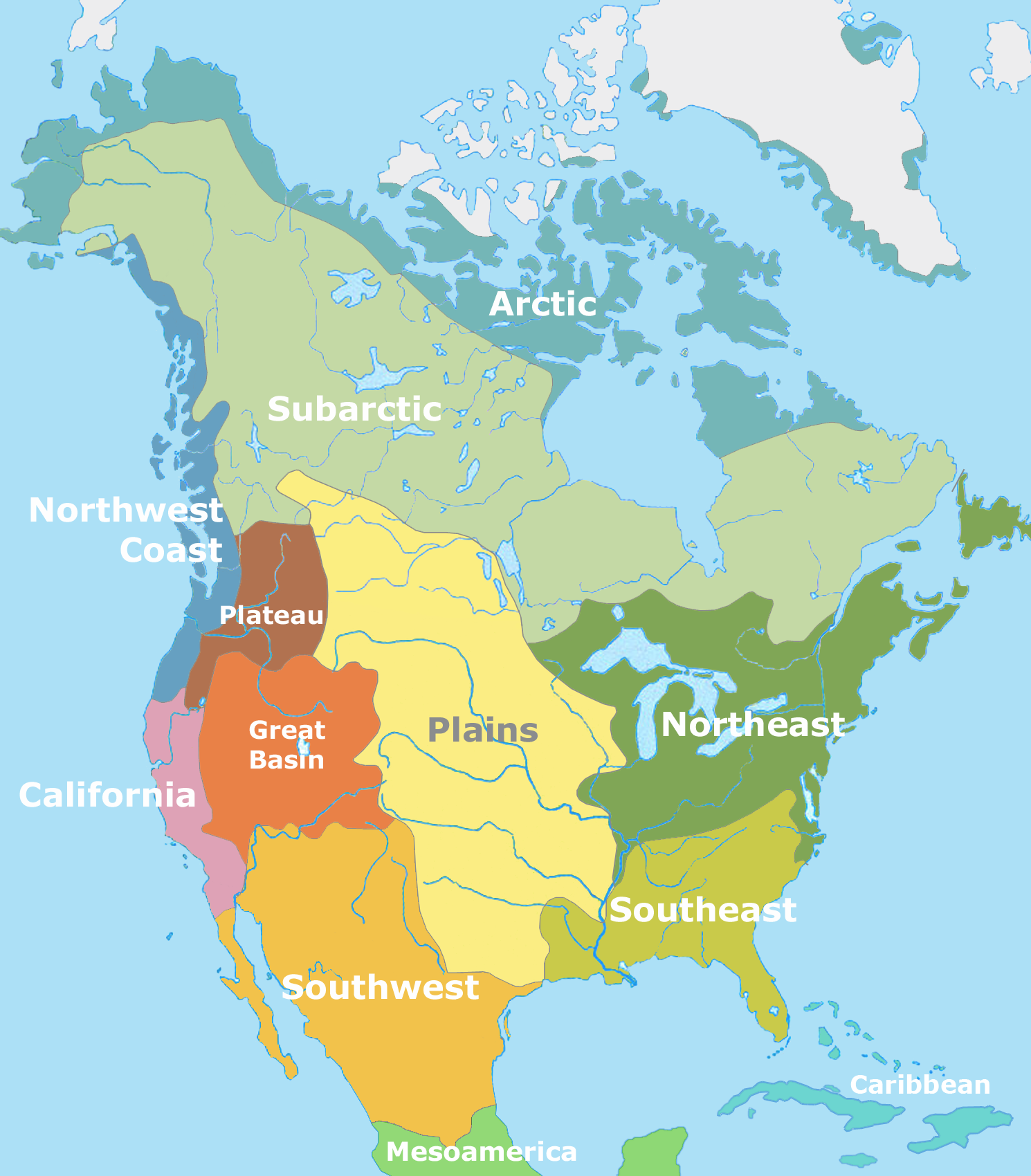
The cultural areas of pre-Columbian North America, according to Alfred Kroeber

The Paleo-Indian or Lithic stage lasted from the first arrival of people in the Americas until about 5000/3000 BCE (in North America). Three major migrations occurred, as traced by linguistic and genetic data; the early Paleoamericans soon spread throughout the Americas, diversifying into many hundreds of culturally distinct nations and tribes. By 8000 BCE the North American climate was very similar to today's. A study published in 2012 gives genetic backing to the 1986 theory put forward by linguist Joseph Greenberg that the Americas must have been populated in three waves, based on language differences.

The Clovis culture, a megafauna hunting culture, is primarily identified by use of fluted spear points. Artifacts from this culture were first excavated in 1932 near Clovis, New Mexico. The Clovis culture ranged over much of North America and also appeared in South America. The culture is identified by the distinctive Clovis point, a flaked flint spear-point with a notched flute, by which it was inserted into a shaft. Dating of Clovis materials has been by association with animal bones and by the use of carbon dating methods. Recent reexaminations of Clovis materials using improved carbon-dating methods produced results of 11,050 and 10,800 radiocarbon years BP (roughly 9100 to 8850 BCE).

Numerous Paleoindian cultures occupied North America, with some arrayed around the Great Plains and Great Lakes of the modern United States of America and Canada, as well as adjacent areas to the West and Southwest. According to the oral histories of many of the Indigenous peoples of the Americas, they have been living on the continents since their genesis, described by a wide range of traditional creation stories. Other tribes have stories that recount migrations across long tracts of land and a great river believed to be the Mississippi River. Genetic and linguistic data connect the Indigenous people of this continent with ancient northeast Asians. Archeological and linguistic data has enabled scholars to discover some of the migrations within the Americas.

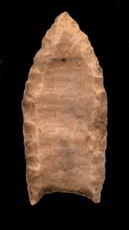
A Folsom point for a spear

The Folsom tradition was characterized by the use of Folsom points as projectile tips and activities known from kill sites, where slaughter and butchering of bison took place. Folsom tools were left behind between 9000 BCE and 8000 BCE.

Na-Dené-speaking peoples entered North America starting around 8000 BCE, reaching the Pacific Northwest by 5000 BCE, and from there migrating along the Pacific Coast and into the interior. Linguists, anthropologists, and archeologists believe their ancestors constituted a separate migration into North America, later than the first Paleo-Indians. They migrated into Alaska and northern Canada, south along the Pacific Coast, into the interior of Canada, and south to the Great Plains and the American Southwest.

They were the earliest ancestors of the Athabascan-speaking peoples, including the present-day and historical Navajo and Apache. They constructed large multi-family dwellings in their villages, which were used seasonally. People did not live there year-round, but for the summer to hunt and fish, and to gather food supplies for the winter.

== Meso-Indian or Archaic stage ==
The Archaic period lasted until about 1000 BCE. A major culture of the Archaic stage was the Mound builders, who stretched from the Great Lakes to the Mississippi and Ohio rivers. Since the 1990s, archeologists have explored and dated eleven Middle Archaic sites in present-day Louisiana and Florida at which early cultures built complexes with multiple earthwork mounds; they were societies of hunter-gatherers rather than the settled agriculturalists believed necessary according to the theory of Neolithic Revolution to sustain such large villages over long periods. Native American cultures are not included in characterizations of advanced Stone Age cultures as "Neolithic," which is a category that more often includes only the cultures in Eurasia, Africa, and other regions.

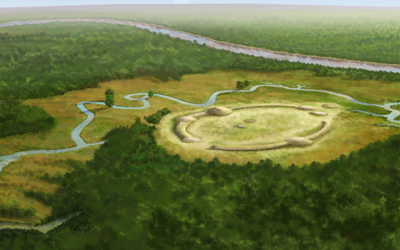
Watson Brake Aerial Illustration

The prime example is Watson Brake in northern Louisiana, whose 11-mound complex is dated to 3500 BCE, making it the oldest dated site in the Americas for such complex construction. It is nearly 2,000 years older than the Poverty Point site. Construction of the mounds went on for 500 years until it was abandoned about 2800 BCE, probably due to changing environmental conditions.

Poverty Point culture is a Late Archaic archaeological culture that inhabited the area of the lower Mississippi Valley and surrounding Gulf Coast. The culture thrived from 2200 BCE to 700 BCE, during the Late Archaic period. Evidence of this culture has been found at more than 100 sites, from the major complex at Poverty Point, Louisiana (a UNESCO World Heritage site) across a 100-mile (160 km) range to the Jaketown Site near Belzoni, Mississippi.

Poverty Point is a 1 square mile (2.6 km^{2}) complex of six major earthwork concentric rings, with additional platform mounds at the site. Artifacts show the people traded with other Native Americans located from Georgia to the Great Lakes region. This is one among numerous mound sites of complex indigenous cultures throughout the Mississippi and Ohio valleys. They were one of several succeeding cultures often referred to as mound builders.

The Oshara tradition people lived from 5500 BCE to 600 CE. They were part of the Southwestern Archaic tradition centered in north-central New Mexico, the San Juan Basin, the Rio Grande Valley, southern Colorado, and southeastern Utah.

== Post-Archaic stage ==
The Post-Archaic stage includes the Formative, Classic and Post-Classic stages in Willey and Phillipp's scheme. The Formative stage lasted from 1000 BCE until about 500 CE, the Classic from about 500 CE to 1200 CE, while the Post-Classic refers to 1200 CE until the present day. It also includes the Woodland period of North American pre-Columbian, whose culture refers to the time period from roughly 1000 BCE to 1000 CE in the eastern part of North America.

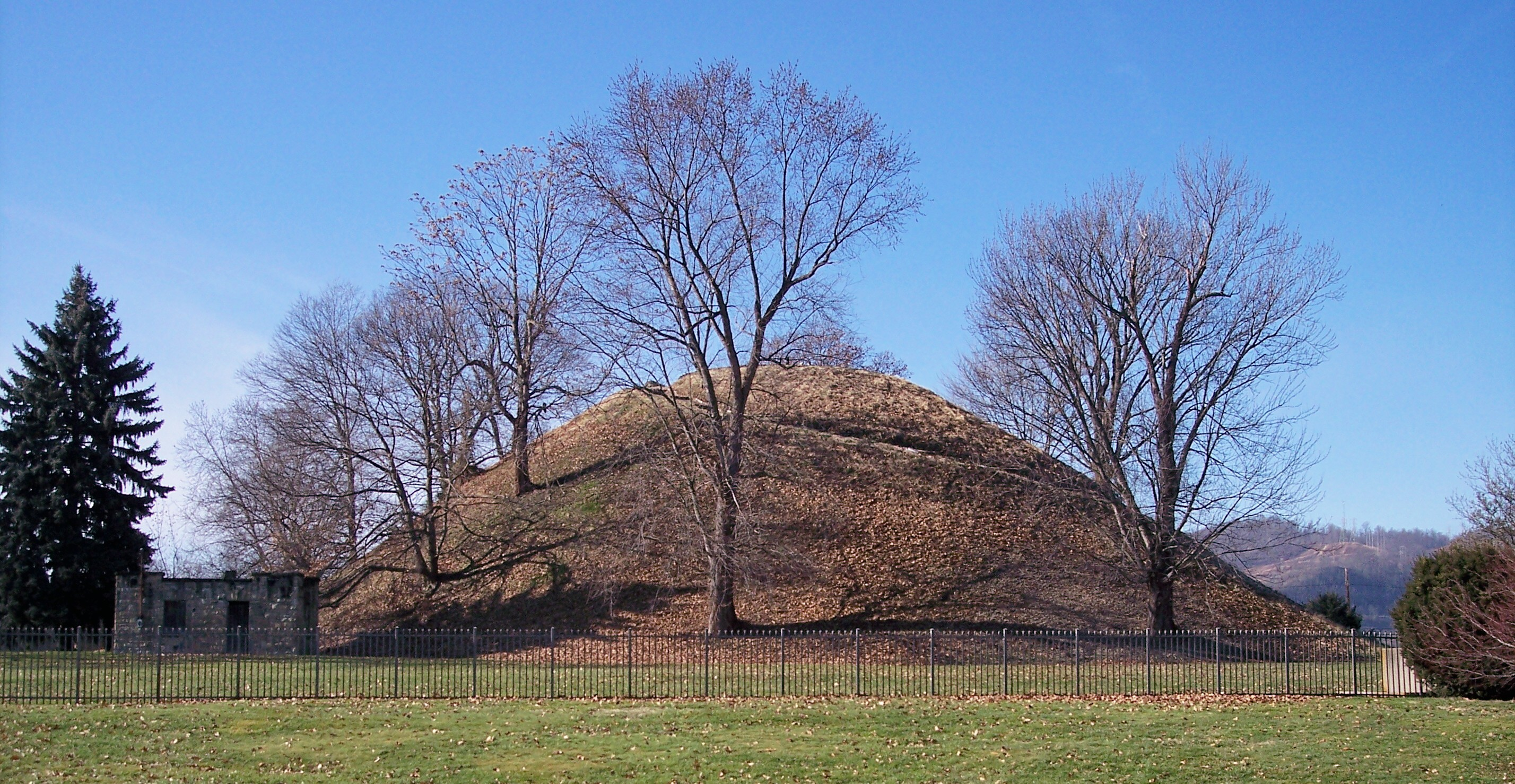
Grave Creek Mound in Moundsville, West Virginia is one of the largest conical mounds in the United States. It was built by the Adena culture.

The term "Woodland" was coined in the 1930s and refers to prehistoric sites dated between the Archaic period and the Mississippian cultures. The Adena culture was a Native American culture that existed from 1000 BCE to 200 BCE, in a time known as the Early Woodland period. The Adena culture refers to what was probably a number of related Native American societies sharing a burial complex and ceremonial system.

The Hopewell tradition is the term for the common aspects of the Woodland period culture that flourished along rivers in the Eastern Woodlands from 200 BCE to 500 CE. The Hopewell tradition was not a single culture or society, but a widely dispersed set of related populations, who were connected by a common network of trade routes, known as the Hopewell Exchange System. At its greatest extent, the Hopewell exchange system ran from the Southeastern Woodlands into the northern shores of Lake Ontario. Within this area, societies participated in a high degree of exchange; most activities were conducted along the waterways that served as their major transportation routes. The Hopewell exchange system traded materials from all over North America.

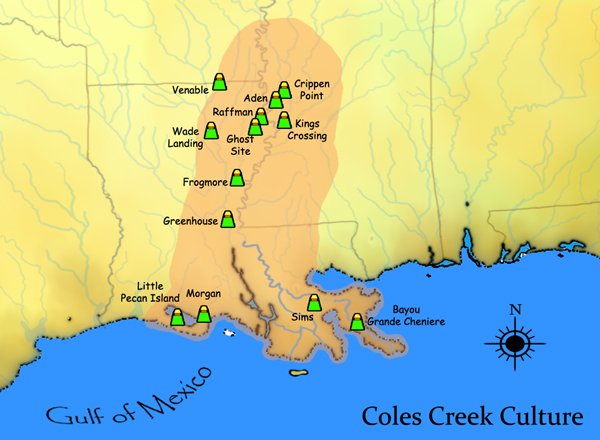
A map showing the extent of the Coles Creek cultural period and some important sites.

The Coles Creek culture was an indigenous development of the Lower Mississippi Valley that took place between the late Woodland period and the later Plaquemine culture period. The period is marked by the increased use of flat-topped platform mounds arranged around central plazas, more complex political institutions, and a subsistence strategy still grounded in the Eastern Agricultural Complex and hunting rather than on the maize plant as would happen in the succeeding Plaquemine Mississippian period. The culture was originally defined by the unique decoration on grog-tempered ceramic ware by James A. Ford after his investigations at the Mazique Archeological Site. He had studied both the Mazique and Coles Creek Sites, and almost went with the Mazique culture, but decided on the less historically involved sites name. It is ancestral to the Plaquemine culture.

The Mississippian culture which extended throughout the Ohio and Mississippi valleys and built sites throughout the Southeast created the largest earthworks in North America north of Mexico, most notably at Cahokia, on a tributary of the Mississippi River in present-day Illinois.

- The ten-story Monks Mound at Cahokia has a larger perimeter than the Pyramid of the Sun at Teotihuacan, and roughly the same as the Great Pyramid of Egypt. The 6 square miles (16 km^{2}) city complex was based on the culture's cosmology; it included more than 100 mounds, positioned to support their sophisticated knowledge of astronomy, and built with knowledge of varying soil types. The society began building at this site about 950 CE, and reached its peak population in 1,250 CE of 20,000–30,000 people, which was not equalled by any city in the present-day United States until after 1800.
- Cahokia was a major regional chiefdom, with trade and tributary chiefdoms located in a range of areas from bordering the Great Lakes to the Gulf of Mexico.
- Kincaid c. 1050–1400 CE, is one of the largest settlements of the Mississippian culture, it was located at the southern tip of present-day U.S. state of Illinois. Kincaid Mounds has been notable for both its significant role in native North American prehistory and for the central role the site has played in the development of modern archaeological techniques. The site had at least 11 substructure platform mounds (ranking fifth for mound-culture pyramids). Artifacts from the settlement link its major habitation and the construction of the mounds to the Mississippian period, but it was also occupied earlier during the Woodland period.
- Etowah Indian Mounds (9BR1) are a 54-acre (220,000 m^{2}) archaeological site in Bartow County, Georgia south of Cartersville, in the United States. Built and occupied in three phases, from 1000–1550 CE, the prehistoric site is on the north shore of the Etowah River.
- The Mississippian culture developed the Southeastern Ceremonial Complex, the name which archeologists have given to the regional stylistic similarity of artifacts, iconography, ceremonies and mythology. The rise of the complex culture was based on the people's adoption of maize agriculture, development of greater population densities, and chiefdom-level complex social organization from 1200 CE to 1650 CE.
- The Mississippian pottery are some of the finest and most widely spread ceramics north of Mexico. Cahokian pottery was espically fine, with smooth surfaces, very thin walls and distinctive tempering, slips and coloring.
Mississippian culture
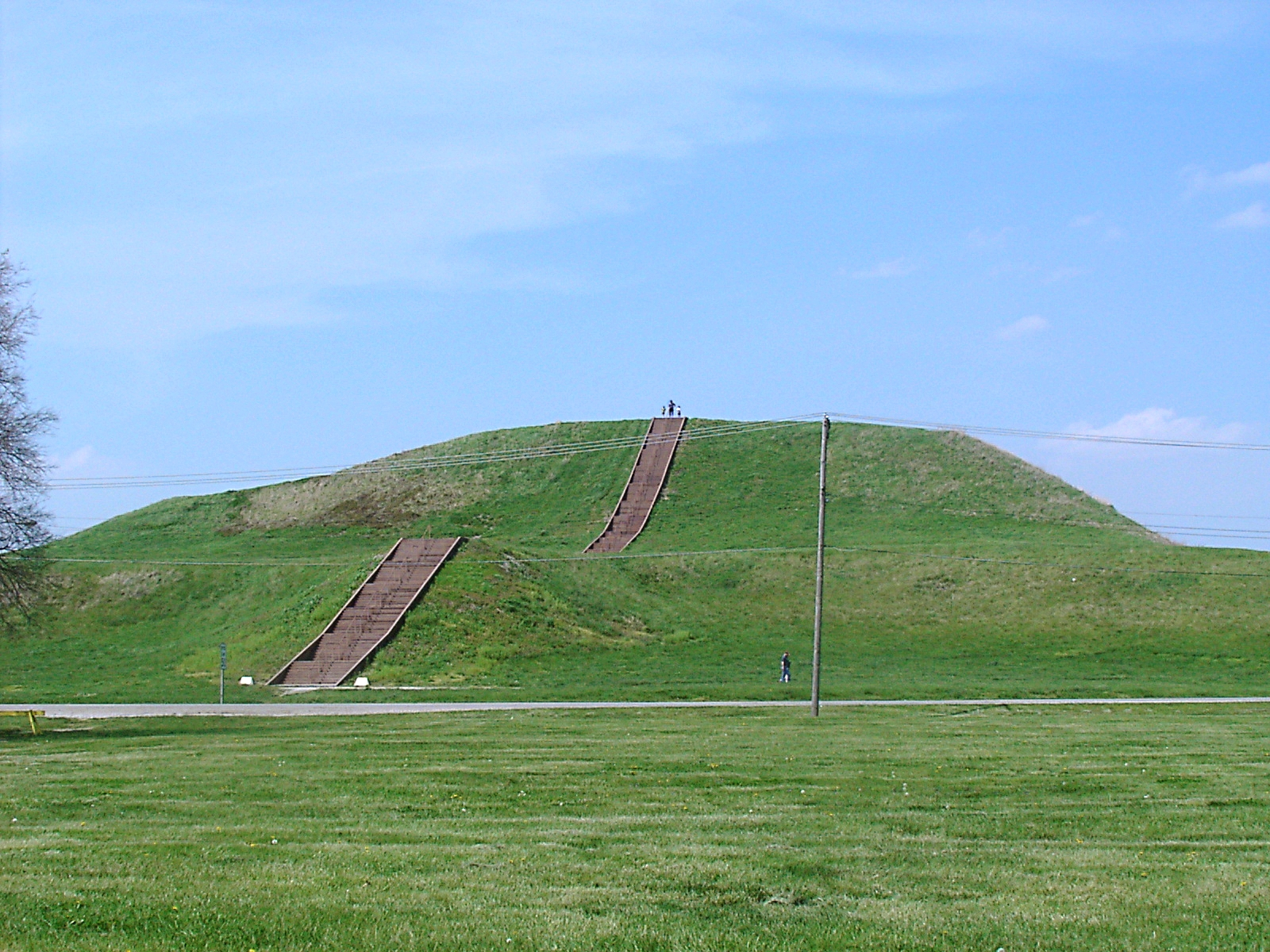
Monks Mound of Cahokia (UNESCO World Heritage Site) in summer. The concrete staircase follows the approximate course of the ancient wooden stairs.

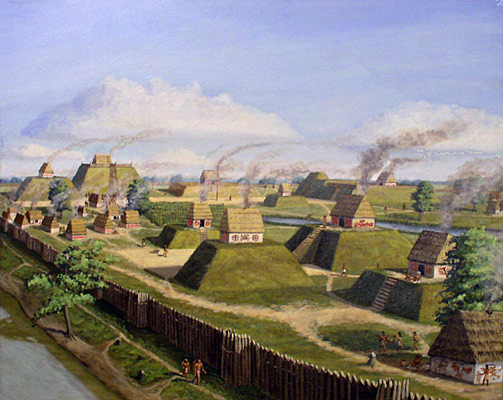
An artistic recreation of The Kincaid Site from the prehistoric Mississippian culture as it may have looked at its peak 1050–1400 CE.

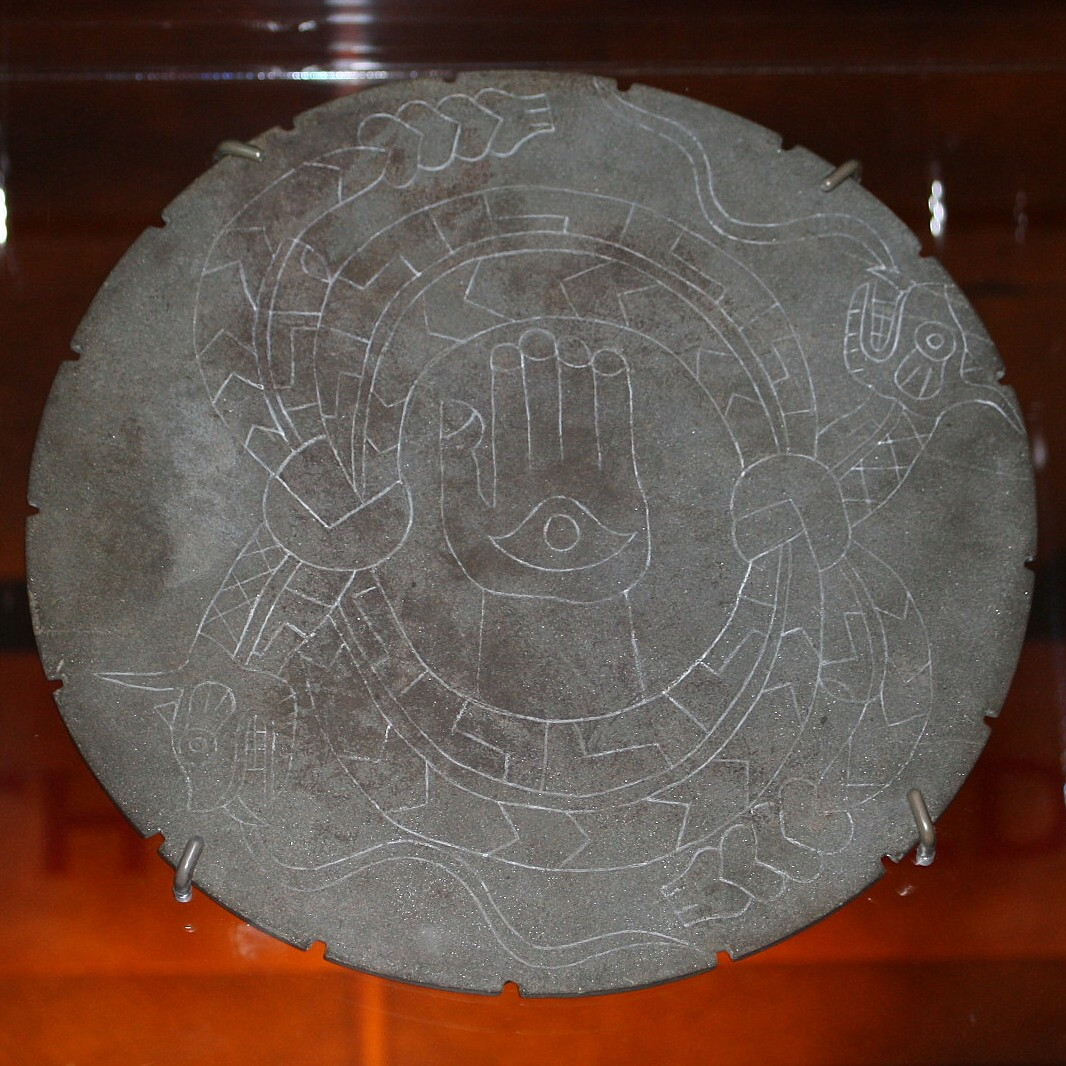
Engraved stone palette from Moundville, illustrating two horned rattlesnakes, perhaps referring to The Great Serpent of the Southeastern Ceremonial Complex.

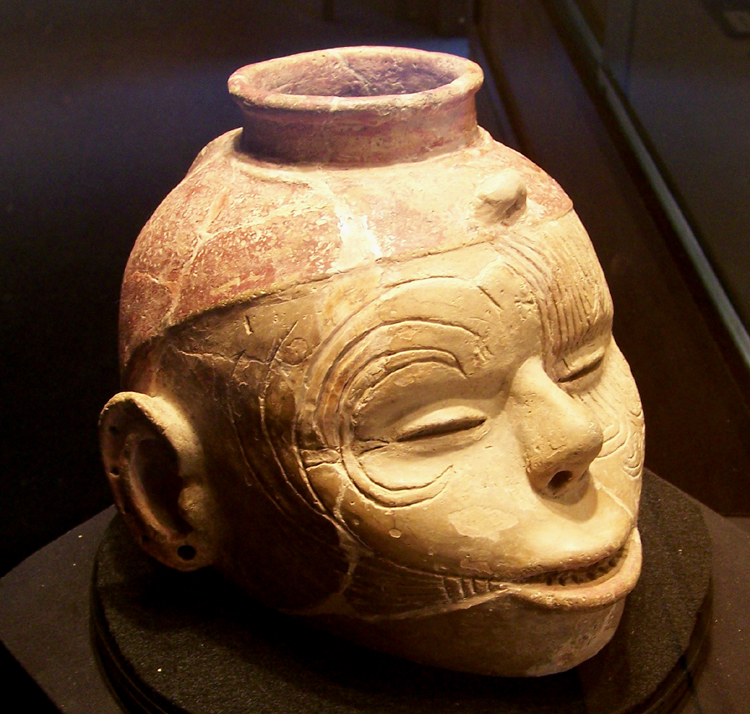
A human head effigy pot from the Nodena Site.

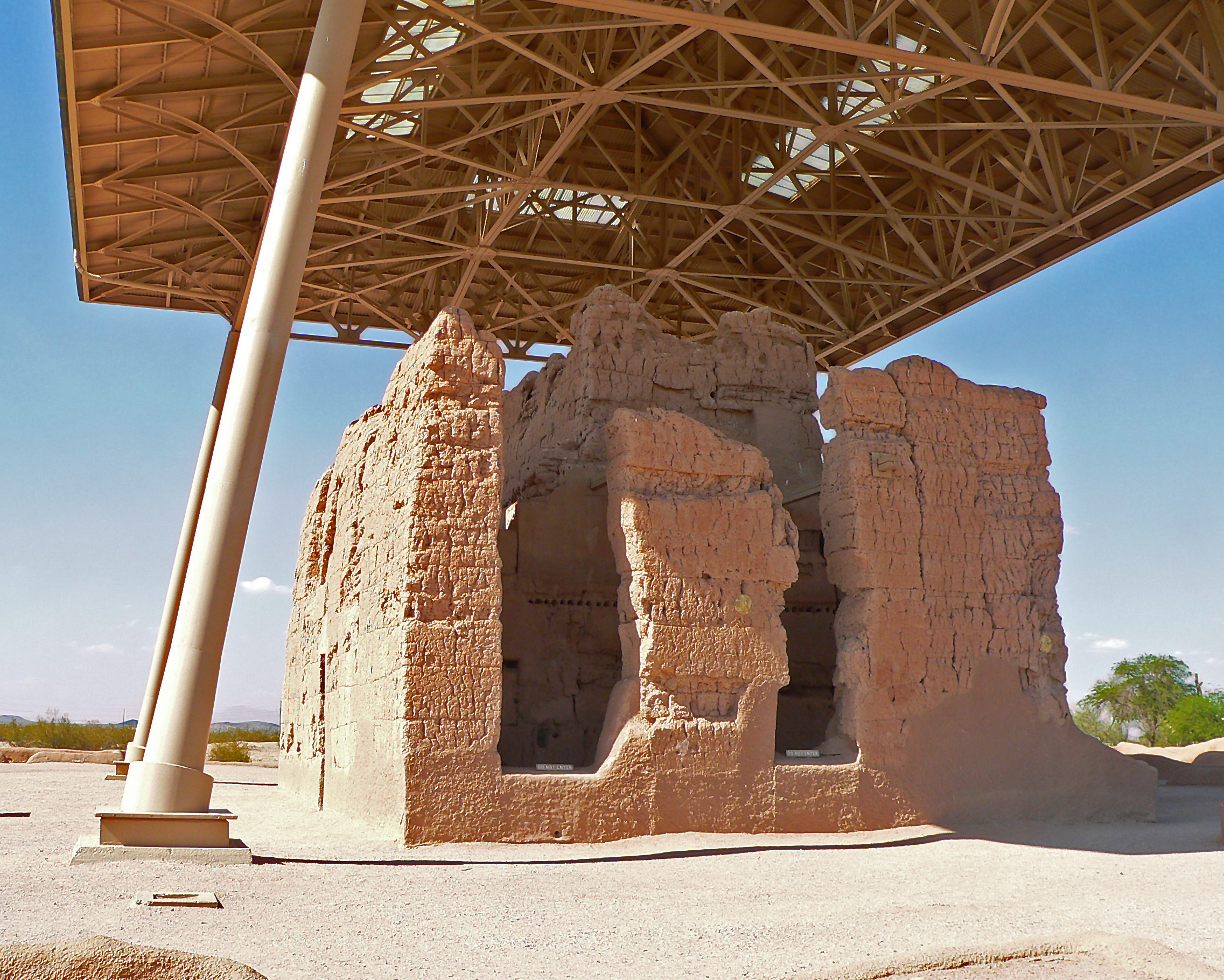
The Great House at the Casa Grande Ruins National Monument

The Hohokam culture was centered along American Southwest. The early Hohokam founded a series of small villages along the middle Gila River. They raised corn, squash, and beans. The communities were near good arable land, with dry farming common in the earlier years of this period. They were known for their pottery, using the paddle-and-anvil technique. The Classical period of the culture saw the rise in architecture and ceramics. Buildings were grouped into walled compounds, as well as earthen platform mounds. Platform mounds were built along river as well as irrigation canal systems, suggesting these sites were administrative centers allocating water and coordinating canal labor. Polychrome pottery appeared, and inhumation burial replaced cremation. The trade included that of shells and other exotics. Social and climatic factors led to a decline and abandonment of the area after 1400 CE.

The Ancestral Puebloan culture covered present-day Four Corners region of the United States, comprising southern Utah, northern Arizona, northwestern New Mexico, and southwestern Colorado. It is believed that the Ancestral Puebloans developed, at least in part, from the Oshara tradition, who developed from the Picosa culture. They lived in a range of structures that included small family pit houses, larger clan type structures, grand pueblos, and cliff sited dwellings. The Ancestral Puebloans possessed a complex network that stretched across the Colorado Plateau linking hundreds of communities and population centers. The culture is perhaps best known for the stone and earth dwellings built along cliff walls, particularly during the Pueblo II and Pueblo III eras.

- Three UNESCO World Heritage Sites in the United States are credited to the Pueblos: Mesa Verde National Park, Chaco Culture National Historical Park and Taos Pueblo.
- The best-preserved examples of the stone dwellings are in National Parks (US), examples being, Navajo National Monument, Chaco Culture National Historical Park, Mesa Verde National Park, Canyons of the Ancients National Monument, Aztec Ruins National Monument, Bandelier National Monument, Hovenweep National Monument, and Canyon de Chelly National Monument.
Ancestral Puebloan archeological sites
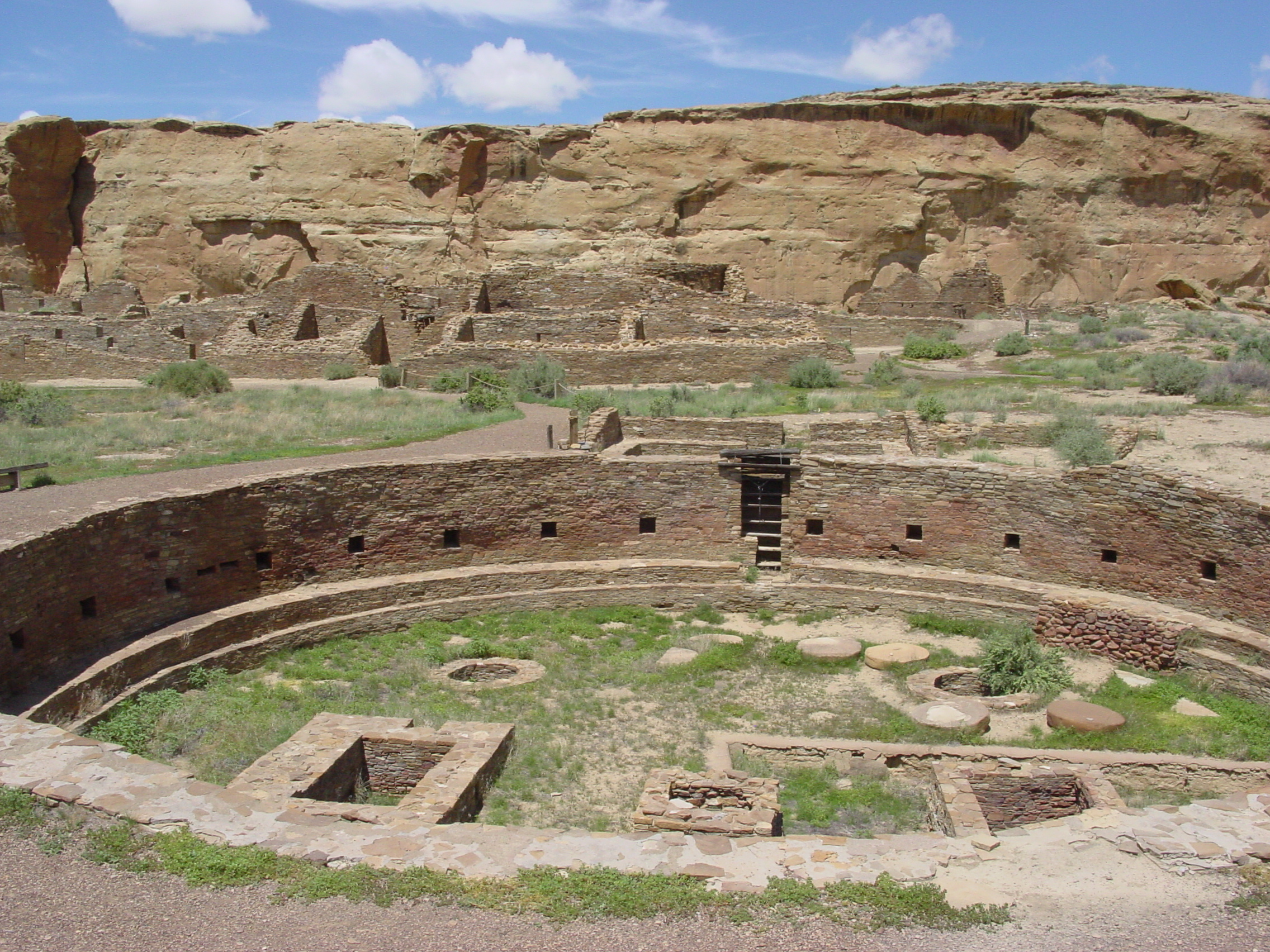
The Great Kiva of Chetro Ketl at the Chaco Culture National Historical Park, UNESCO World Heritage Site.

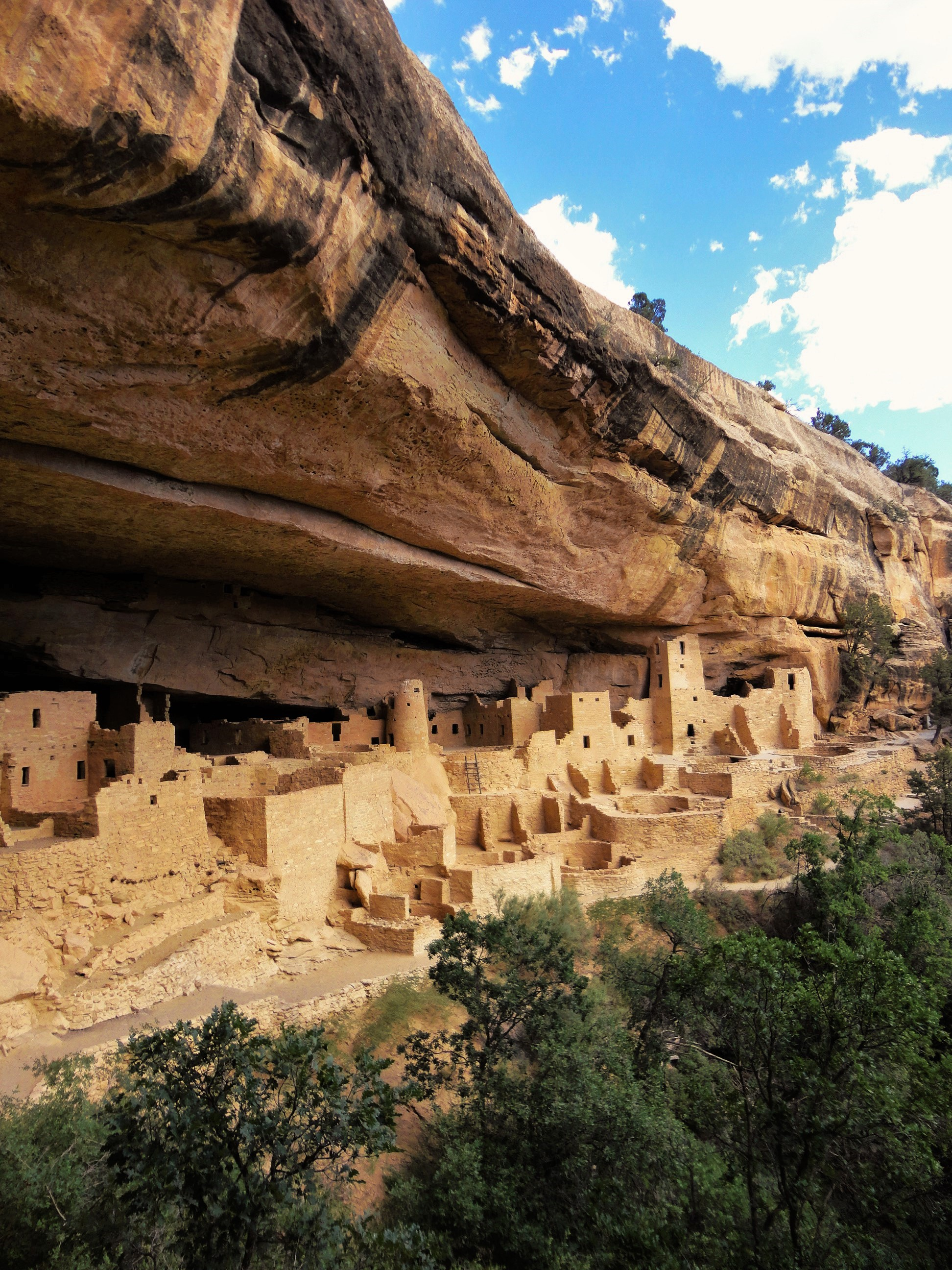
Cliff Palace, Mesa Verde National Park, a UNESCO World Heritage Site.

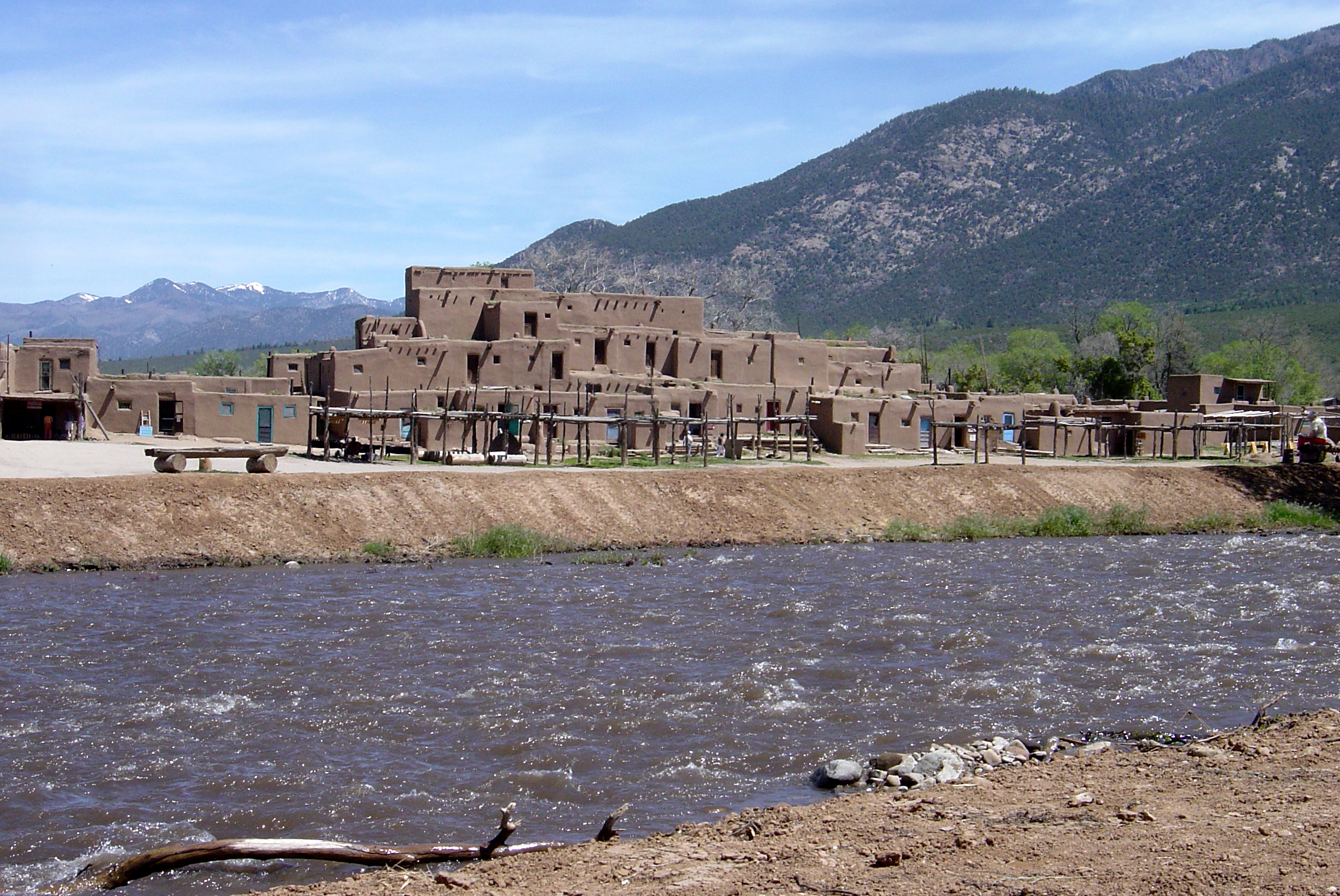
Taos Pueblo, a UNESCO World Heritage Site, is an Ancient Pueblo belonging to a Native American tribe of Pueblo people, marking the cultural development in the region during the Pre-Columbian era.

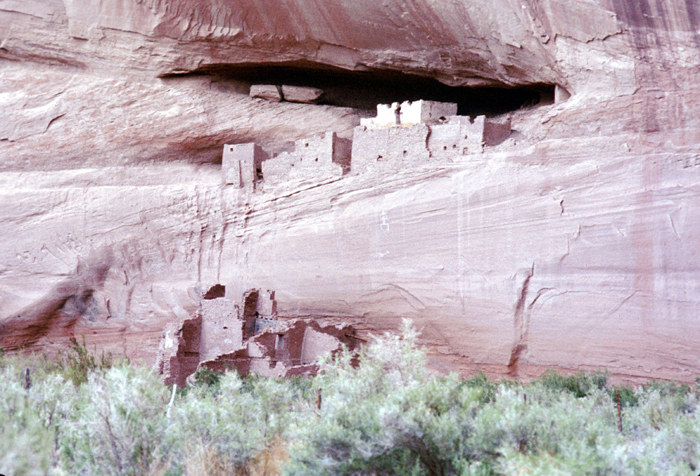
White House Ruins, Canyon de Chelly National Monument.

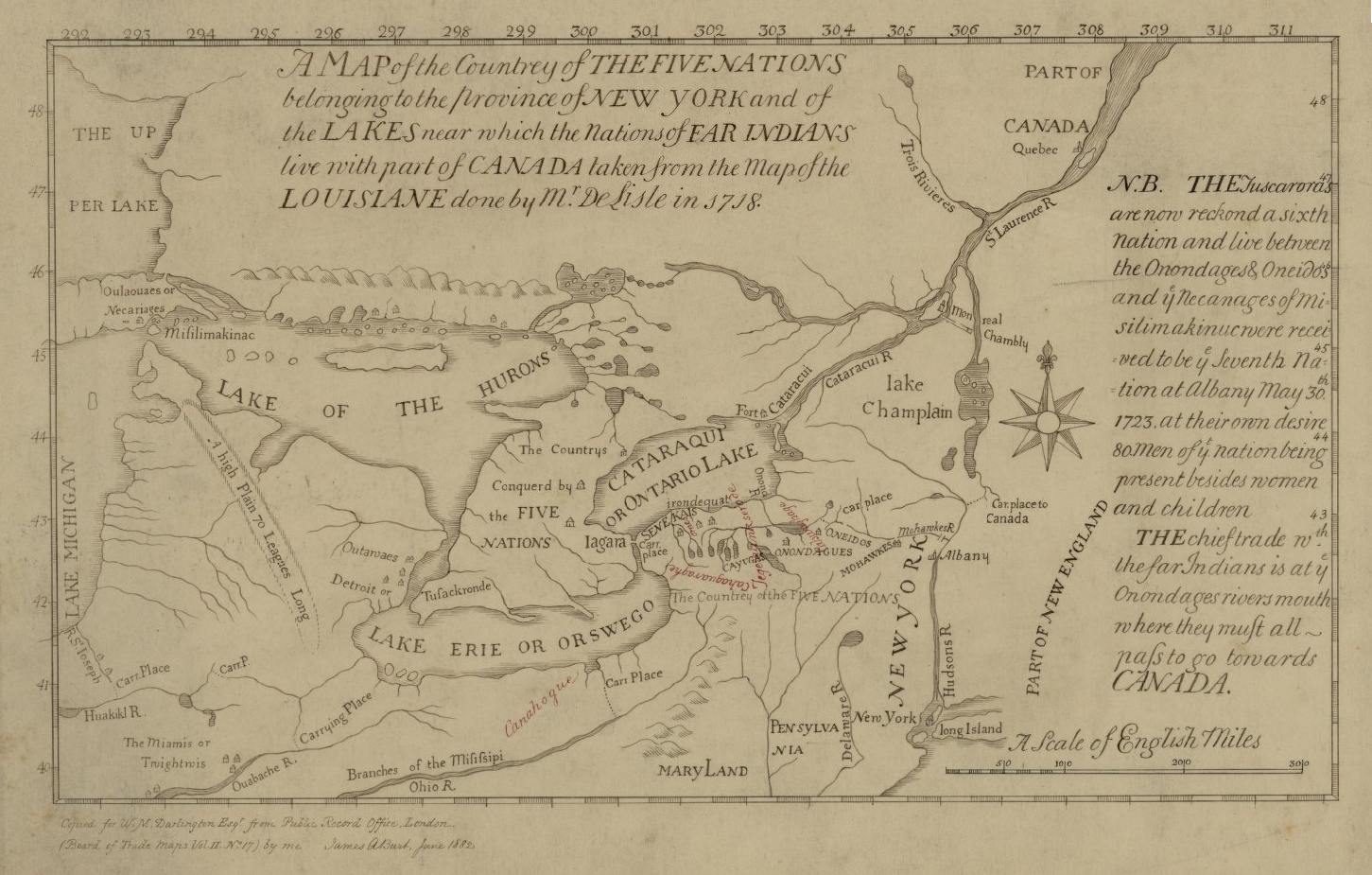
Map of the Five Nations of the Haudenosaunee (from the Darlington Collection)

The Iroquois League of Five Nations or "People of the Long House", based in present-day upstate and western New York, had a confederacy model from the mid-15th century. It has been suggested that their culture contributed to political thinking during the development of the later United States government. Their system of affiliation was a kind of federation, different from the strong, centralized European monarchies.

- Long-distance trading did not prevent warfare and displacement among the Indigenous peoples, and their oral histories tell of numerous migrations to the historic territories where Europeans encountered them. The Haudenosaunee invaded and attacked tribes in the Ohio River area of present-day Kentucky and claimed the hunting grounds. Historians have placed these events as occurring as early as the 13th century, or in the 17th century Beaver Wars.
- Through warfare, the Haudenosaunee drove several tribes to migrate west to what became known as their historically traditional lands west of the Mississippi River. Tribes originating in the Ohio Valley who moved west included the Osage, Kaw, Ponca and Omaha people. By the mid-17th century, they had resettled in their historical lands in present-day Kansas, Nebraska, Arkansas and Oklahoma. The Osage warred with Caddo-speaking Native Americans, displacing them in turn by the mid-18th century and dominating their new historical territories.

== European exploration and colonization ==
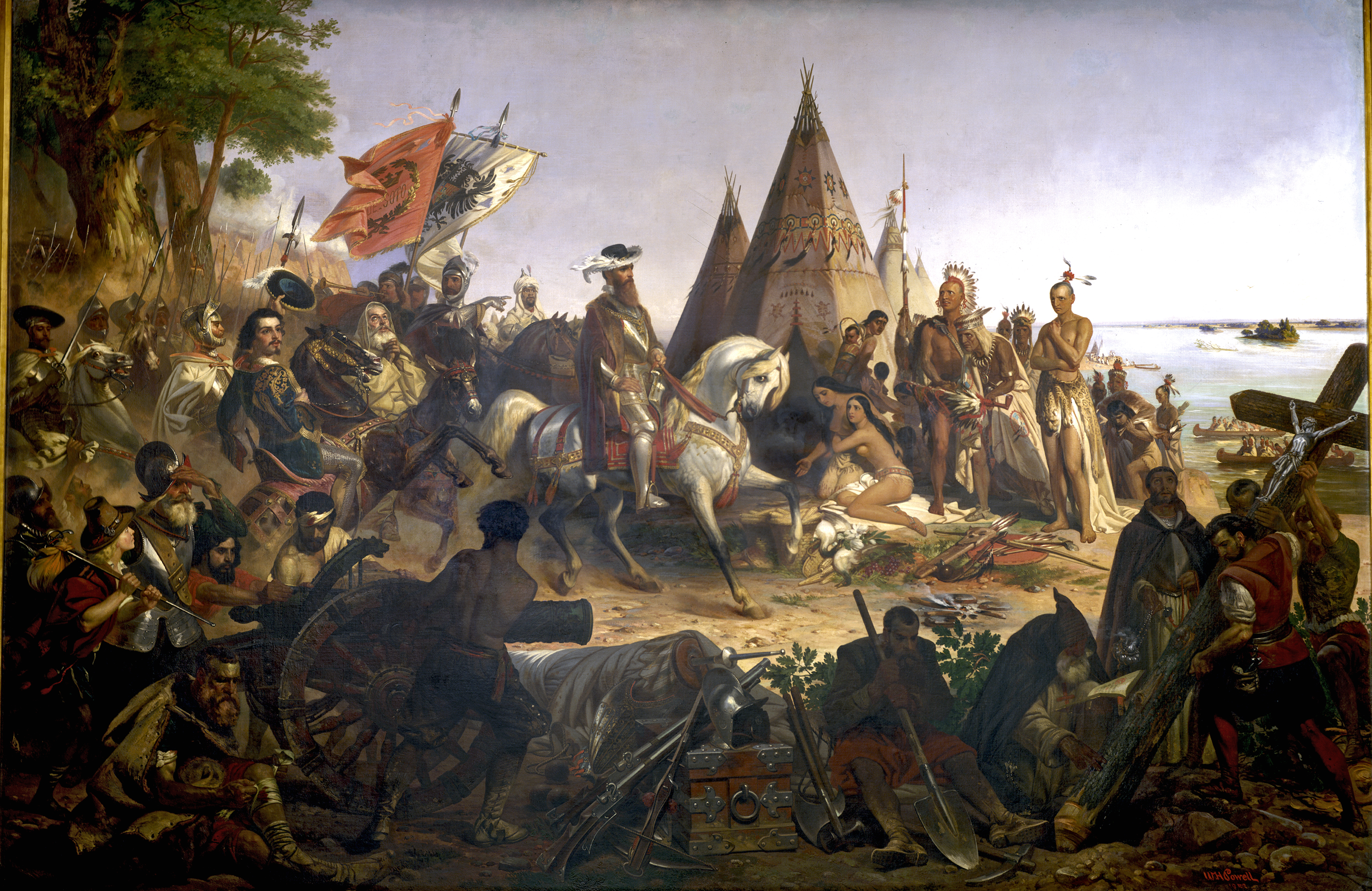
Discovery of the Mississippi by William Henry Powell (1823–1879) is a Romantic depiction of de Soto's seeing the Mississippi River for the first time. It hangs in the United States Capitol rotunda.

After 1492, European exploration and colonization of the Americas revolutionized how the Old and New Worlds perceived themselves. One of the first major contacts, in what would be called the American Deep South, occurred when the conquistador Juan Ponce de León landed in La Florida in April 1513. He was later followed by other Spanish explorers, such as Pánfilo de Narváez in 1528 and Hernando de Soto in 1539. The subsequent European colonists in North America often rationalized their expansion of empire with the assumption that they were saving a barbaric, pagan world by spreading Christian civilization.

In the Spanish colonization of the Americas, the policy of Indian Reductions resulted in the forced conversions to Catholicism of the Indigenous people in northern Nueva España. They had long-established spiritual and religious traditions and theological beliefs which included human sacrifice. What developed during the colonial years and since has been a syncretic Catholicism that absorbed and reflected indigenous beliefs; the religion changed in New Spain.

=== Impact on native populations ===
From the 18th through the 19th centuries, the population of Native Americans declined in the following ways: epidemic diseases brought from Europe; violence and warfare, such as the Indian Wars at the hands of European explorers and colonists; displacement from their lands including forced marches such as the Trail of Tears resulted in many deaths as did enslavement; continued tribal internal warfare; and a high rate of intermarriage also led to a reduction in the numbers of Native Americans. Most mainstream scholars believe that, among the various contributing factors, epidemic disease was the overwhelming cause of the population decline of the American natives because of their lack of immunity to new diseases brought from Europe. With the rapid declines of some populations and continuing rivalries among their nations, Native Americans sometimes re-organized to form new cultural groups, such as the Seminoles of Florida in the 19th century and the Mission Indians of Alta California. Some scholars characterize the treatment of Native Americans by the US as genocide or genocidal whilst others dispute this characterization.

Estimating the number of Native Americans living in what is today the United States of America before the arrival of the European explorers and settlers has been the subject of much debate. While it is difficult to determine exactly how many Natives lived in North America before Columbus, estimates range from a low of 2.1 million (Ubelaker 1976) to 7 million people (Russell Thornton) to a high of 18 million (Dobyns 1983). A low estimate of around 1 million was first posited by the anthropologist James Mooney in the 1890s, by calculating the population density of each culture area based on its carrying capacity.

In 1965, the American anthropologist Henry F. Dobyns published studies estimating the original population to have been 10 to 12 million. By 1983, he increased his estimates to 18 million. Historian David Henige criticized higher estimates such as those of Dobyns', writing that many population figures are the result of arbitrary formulas selectively applied to numbers from unreliable historical sources. By 1800, the Native population of the present-day United States had declined to approximately 600,000, and only 250,000 Native Americans remained in the 1890s.

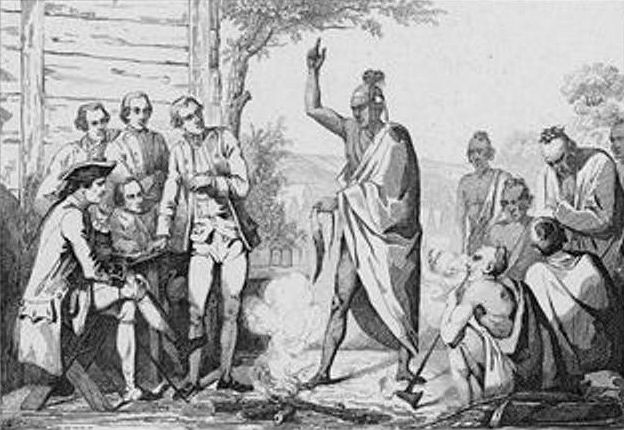
A conference of French and Indian leaders around a ceremonial fire by Émile Louis Vernier

Chickenpox and measles, endemic but rarely fatal among Europeans (long after being introduced from Asia), often proved deadly to Native Americans. Smallpox epidemics often immediately followed European exploration and sometimes destroyed entire village populations. While precise figures are difficult to determine, some historians estimate that at least 30% (and sometimes 50% to 70%) of some Native populations died after first contact due to Eurasian smallpox. One element of the Columbian exchange suggests explorers from the Christopher Columbus expedition contracted syphilis from Indigenous peoples and carried it back to Europe, where it spread widely. Other researchers believe that the disease existed in Europe and Asia before Columbus and his men returned from exposure to Indigenous peoples of the Americas, but that they brought back a more virulent form.

In the 100 years following the arrival of the Spanish to the Americas, large disease epidemics depopulated large parts of the Eastern Woodlands in the 15th century. In 1618–1619, smallpox killed 90% of the Native Americans in the area of the Massachusetts Bay. Historians believe many Mohawk in present-day New York became infected after contact with children of Dutch traders in Albany in 1634. The disease swept through Mohawk villages, reaching the Onondaga at Lake Ontario by 1636, and the lands of the western Haudenosaunee by 1679, as it was carried by Mohawk and other Native Americans who traveled the trading routes. The high rate of fatalities caused breakdowns in Native American societies and disrupted generational exchange of culture.

Native California Population, according to Cook 1978. The 2010 U.S. Census reported 723,225 Native Americans in California.

After European explorers reached the West Coast in the 1770s, smallpox rapidly killed at least 30% of Northwest Coast Native Americans. For the next 80 to 100 years, smallpox and other diseases devastated native populations in the region. Puget Sound area populations, once estimated as high as 37,000 people, were reduced to only 9,000 survivors by the time settlers arrived en masse in the mid-19th century. The Spanish missions in California did not have a large effect on the overall population of Native Americans because the small number of missions was concentrated in a small area along the southern and central coast. The number of Indigenous people decreased more rapidly after California ceased to be a Spanish colony, especially during the second half of the 19th century and the beginning of the 20th (see chart on the right).

Smallpox epidemics in 1780–1782 and 1837–1838 brought devastation and drastic depopulation among the Plains Indians. By 1832, the federal government established a smallpox vaccination program for Native Americans (The Indian Vaccination Act of 1832). It was the first federal program created to address the health problems of Native Americans.

=== Animal introductions ===
With the meeting of two worlds, animals, insects, and plants were carried from one to the other, both deliberately and by chance, in what is called the Columbian exchange. Sheep, pigs, horses, and cattle were all Old World animals that were introduced to contemporary Native Americans who never knew such animals.

In the 16th century, Spaniards and other Europeans brought horses to Mexico. Some of the horses escaped and began to breed and increase their numbers in the wild. The early American horse had been game for the earliest humans on the continent. It was hunted to extinction about 7000 BCE, just after the end of the last glacial period. Native Americans benefited from the reintroduction of horses, as they adopted the use of the animals, they began to change their cultures in substantial ways, especially by extending their nomadic ranges for hunting.

The reintroduction of the horse to North America had a profound impact on Native American culture of the Great Plains. The tribes trained and used horses to ride and to carry packs or pull travois. The people fully incorporated the use of horses into their societies and expanded their territories. They used horses to carry goods for exchange with neighboring tribes, to hunt game, especially bison, and to conduct wars and horse raids.

== 16th century ==
A map showing the approximate locations of Native American nations in present-day North America, c. 16th century

The 16th century saw the first contacts between Native Americans in what was to become the United States and European explorers and settlers.

=== Southeast ===
One of the first major contacts, in what would be called the American Deep South, occurred when the conquistador Juan Ponce de León landed in La Florida in April 1513. There he encountered the Timucuan and Ais peoples. De León returned in 1521 in an attempt at colonization, but after fierce resistance from the Calusa people, the attempt was abandoned. He was later followed by other Spanish explorers, such as Pánfilo de Narváez in 1528 and Hernando de Soto in 1539.

=== Southwest ===
In 1536, a group of four Spanish explorers and one enslaved black Moorish man, found themselves stranded on the coast of what is now Texas. The group was led by Álvar Núñez Cabeza de Vaca, and for a time they were held in semi captivity by the coastal natives. The enslaved Moor, whose name was Esteban, later became a scout who had encounters with the Zunis. Rumors of the fabled Seven Cities of Gold being located in the northern area of New Spain began to emerge amongst the Spaniards. And in 1540 Francisco Vázquez de Coronado, using the information gained by the scouting expeditions of Esteban and Fray Marcos, set out to conquer Cíbola. Coronado and his band of over one thousand found no cities of gold. What the conquistadors did encounter was Hawikuh, a Zuni town. There the Zuni people, having never seen horses or a band of this size before, were frightened. Although Coronado had been explicitly instructed not to harm the natives, when the Zuni refused his insistence for food and supplies, Coronado ordered an attack on the town.

== 17th century ==
Through the mid 17th century the Beaver Wars were fought over the fur trade between the Haudenosaunee and the Wendat, the northern Algonquians, and their French allies. During the war the Haudenosaunee destroyed several large tribal confederacies—including the Wendat, Neutral, Erie, Susquehannock, and Shawnee, and became dominant in the region and enlarged their territory.

=== King Philip's War ===
Indian (Native American) tribes and linguistic stocks in 1650.

King Philip's War, also called Metacom's War or Metacom's Rebellion, was an armed conflict between Native American inhabitants of present-day southern New England and English colonists and their Native American allies from 1675 to 1676. It continued in northern New England (primarily on the Maine frontier) even after King Philip was killed, until a treaty was signed at Casco Bay in April 1678. According to a combined estimate of loss of life in Schultz and Tougias' King Philip's War, The History and Legacy of America's Forgotten Conflict (based on sources from the Department of Defense, the Bureau of Census, and the work of Colonial historian Francis Jennings), 800 out of 52,000 English colonists of New England (1 out of every 65) and 3,000 out of 20,000 natives (3 out of every 20) lost their lives due to the war, which makes it proportionately one of the bloodiest and costliest in the history of America. More than half of New England's 90 towns were assaulted by Native American warriors. One in ten soldiers on both sides were wounded or killed.

The war is named after the main leader of the Native American side, Metacomet (also known as Metacom or Pometacom) who was known to the English as King Philip. He was the last Massasoit (Great Leader) of the Pokanoket Tribe/Pokanoket Federation and Wampanoag Nation. Upon their loss to the Colonists, many managed to flee to the North to continue their fight against the British (Massachusetts Bay Colony) by joining with the Abenaki Tribes and Wabanaki Federation.

== 18th century ==
Between 1754 and 1763, many Native American tribes were involved in the French and Indian War/Seven Years' War. Those involved in the fur trade in the northern areas tended to ally with French forces against British colonial militias. Native Americans fought on both sides of the conflict. The greater number of tribes fought with the French in the hopes of checking British expansion. The British had made fewer allies, but it was joined by some tribes that wanted to prove assimilation and loyalty in support of treaties to preserve their territories. They were often disappointed when such treaties were later overturned. The tribes had their own purposes, using their alliances with the European powers to battle traditional Native enemies.

=== Native American influence ===
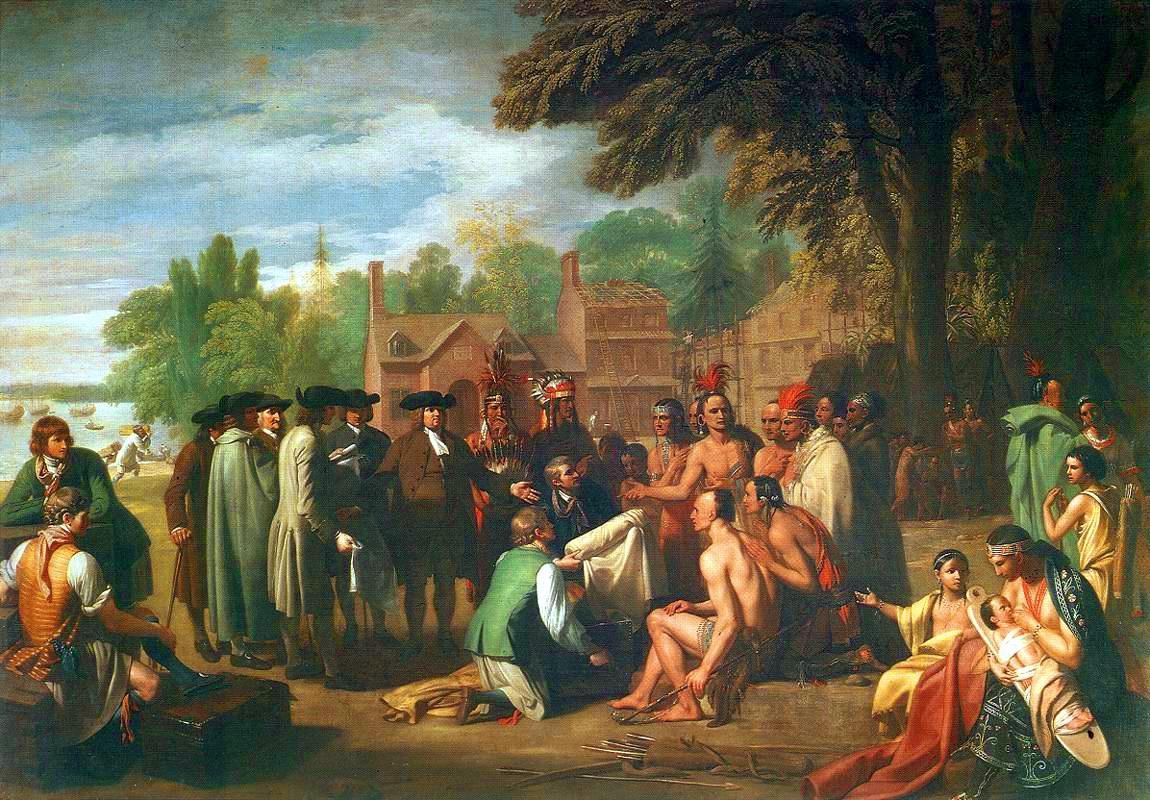
The Treaty of Penn with the Indians by Benjamin West painted in 1771.

Native American culture began to have an influence on European thought in this period. Some Europeans considered Native American societies to be representative of a golden age known to them only in folk history. The political theorist Jean Jacques Rousseau wrote that the idea of freedom and democratic ideals was born in the Americas because "it was only in America" that Europeans from 1500 to 1776 knew of societies that were "truly free."

Natural freedom is the only object of the policy of the [Native Americans]; with this freedom do nature and climate rule alone amongst them ... [Native Americans] maintain their freedom and find abundant nourishment... [and are] people who live without laws, without police, without religion.

In the 20th century, some writers have credited the Five Nations' political confederacy and democratic government as being influences for the development of the Articles of Confederation and the United States Constitution. In October 1988, the U.S. Congress passed Concurrent Resolution 331 to recognize the influence of the Iroquois Constitution upon the U.S. Constitution and Bill of Rights.

However, leading historians of the period note that historic evidence is lacking to support such an interpretation. Gordon Wood wrote, "The English colonists did not need the Indians to tell them about federalism or self-government. The New England Confederation was organized as early as 1643." The historian Jack Rakove, a specialist in early American history, in 2005 noted that the voluminous documentation of the Constitutional proceedings "contain no significant reference to Iroquois." Secondly, he notes: "All the key political concepts that were the stuff of American political discourse before the Revolution and after, had obvious European antecedents and referents: bicameralism, separation of powers, confederations, and the like."

American Indians have played a central role in shaping the history of the nation, and they are deeply woven into the social fabric of much of American life.... During the last three decades of the 20th century, scholars of ethnohistory, of the "new Indian history," and of Native American studies forcefully demonstrated that to understand American history and the American experience, one must include American Indians.

— Robbie Ethridge, Creek Country.

=== American Revolution ===
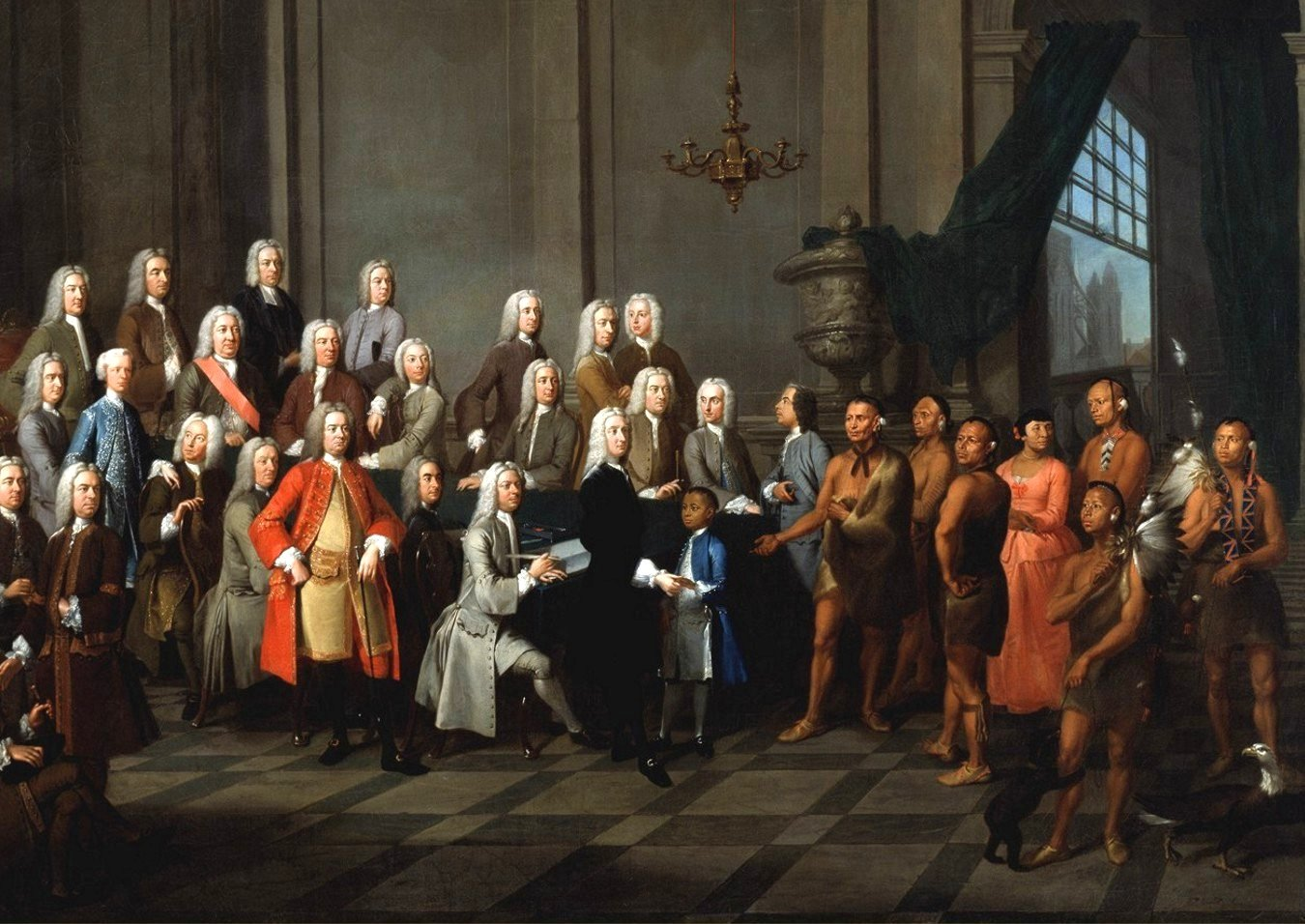
Yamacraw Creek Native Americans meet with the Trustee of the colony of Georgia in England, July 1734. The painting shows a Native American boy (in a blue coat) and woman (in a red dress) in European clothing.

During the American Revolutionary War, the newly proclaimed United States competed with the British for the allegiance of Native American nations east of the Mississippi River. Most Native Americans who joined the struggle sided with the British, based both on their trading relationships and hopes that the Americans' defeat would result in a halt to further white expansion onto Native American land. Many native communities were divided over which side to support in the war and others wanted to remain neutral. Seeking out treaties with the Indigenous inhabitants soon became a very pressing matter. It was during the American Revolutionary War that the newly forming United States signed its first treaty as a nation with the Indigenous inhabitants. In a bid to gain ground near the British stronghold of Detroit, the Continental Congress reached out to the Leni Lenape, also known as the Delawares, to form an alliance. Understanding a treaty would be the best way to secure this alliance, in 1778 The Treaty with The Delawares was signed by representatives from the Congress and the Lenape. For the Haudenosaunee Confederacy, based in New York, the American Revolutionary War resulted in civil war. The only Haudenosaunee nations to ally with the Americans were the Oneida and Tuscarora.

Frontier warfare during the American Revolutionary War was particularly brutal, with noncombatants suffering greatly. Both sides committed numerous atrocities and destroyed villages and food supplies to reduce the ability of people to fight, as in frequent raids in the Mohawk Valley and central New York. The largest of these expeditions was the Sullivan Expedition of 1779, in which American troops destroyed more than 40 Haudenosaunee villages in order to neutralize Haudenosaunee raids. The expedition failed to have the desired effect: Native American activity became even more determined.

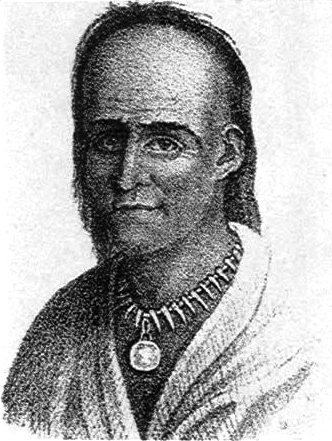
Mishikinakwa ("Little Turtle")'s forces defeated an American force of nearly 1000 U.S. Army soldiers and other casualties at the Battle of the Wabash in 1791.

The British made peace with the United States in the Treaty of Paris. Native Americans were not a party to the treaty. The British ceded vast Native American territories to the United States without consulting or even informing the Native Americans. Within the Peace Treaty of Paris of 1783, no mention of Indigenous peoples or their rights were made. The United States initially treated the Native Americans who had fought as allies with the British as a conquered peoples who had lost their lands. Although most members of the Haudenosaunee tribes went to Canada with the Loyalists, others tried to stay in New York and western territories to maintain their lands. The state of New York made a separate treaty with Haudenosaunee nations and put up for sale 5,000,000 acres (20,000 km^{2}) of land that had previously been their territories. The state established small reservations in western New York for the remnant peoples.

The Indians presented a reverse image of European civilization, which helped America establish a national identity that was neither savage nor civilized.

— Charles Sanford, The Quest for Paradise: Europe and the American Moral Imagination

=== After the formation of the United States ===
The United States was eager to expand, to develop farming and settlements in new areas, and to satisfy land hunger of settlers from New England and new immigrants. The belief and inaccurate presumption was that the land was not settled and existed in a state of nature and therefore was free to be settled by citizens of the newly formed United States. In the years after the American Revolution, the newly formed nation set about acquiring lands in the Northwest Territory through a multitude of treaties with Native nations. The coercive tactics used to obtain these treaties often left the Native Nations with the option to sell the land or face war. The states and settlers were frequently at odds with this policy. Congress passed the Northwest Ordinance in 1787, which was conceived to allow for the United States to sell lands inhabited by the Native nations to settlers willing to move into that area.

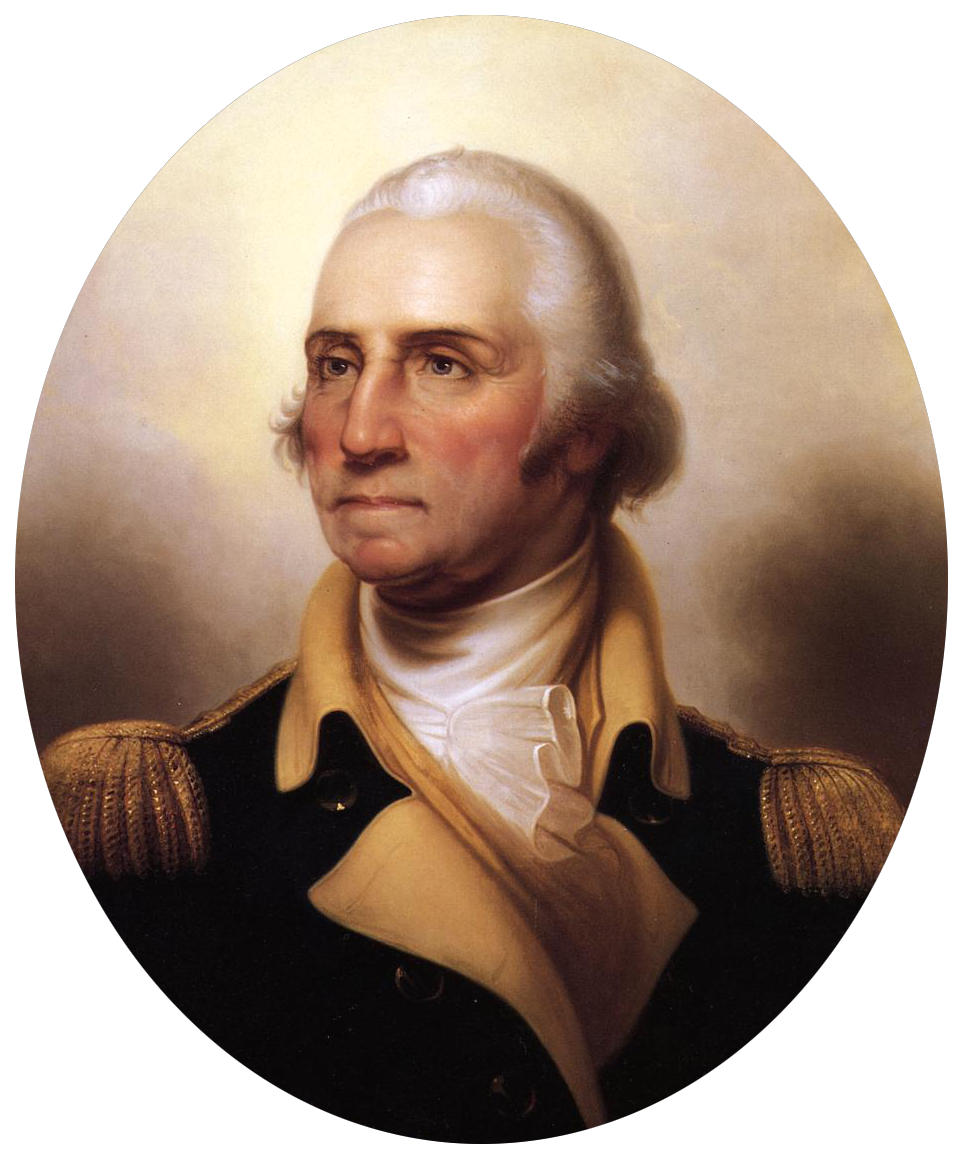
The Haudenosaunee have referred to George Washington as Hanadagá·yas —‘town-destroyer’—for the US assault that razed 40 Haudenosaunee towns during the American Revolutionary War.

Treaty of the Six Nations of 1784 brokered to end all hostilities between the United States and the Haudenosaunee Confederation

During this time, what came to be called The Northwest Indian War also began, led by the Native nations of the Ohio country trying to repulse American settlers and halt the seizure of land by the Continental Congress. Leaders such as Little Turtle and Blue Jacket lead the allied tribes of the Miamis and Shawnees, who were among the tribes that had been disregarded during the signing of the Peace Treaty of Paris.

European nations sent Native Americans (sometimes against their will) to the Old World as objects of curiosity. They often entertained royalty and were sometimes prey to commercial purposes. Christianization of Native Americans was a charted purpose for some European colonies.

Whereas it hath at this time become peculiarly necessary to warn the citizens of the United States against a violation of the treaties.... I do by these presents require, all officers of the United States, as well civil as military, and all other citizens and inhabitants thereof, to govern themselves according to the treaties and act aforesaid, as they will answer the contrary at their peril.

— George Washington, Proclamation Regarding Treaties, 1790.

United States policy toward Native Americans had continued to evolve after the American Revolution. George Washington and Henry Knox believed that Native Americans were equals but that their society was inferior. Washington formulated a policy to encourage the "civilizing" process. Washington had a six-point plan for civilization which included:

1. impartial justice toward Native Americans
2. regulated buying of Native American lands
3. promotion of commerce
4. promotion of experiments to civilize or improve Native American society
5. presidential authority to give presents
6. punishing those who violated Native American rights.

Robert Remini, a historian, wrote that "once the Indians adopted the practice of private property, built homes, farmed, educated their children, and embraced Christianity, these Native Americans would win acceptance from white Americans." The United States appointed agents, like Benjamin Hawkins, to live among the Native Americans and to teach them how to live like whites.

How different would be the sensation of a philosophic mind to reflect that instead of exterminating a part of the human race by our modes of population that we had persevered through all difficulties and at last had imparted our Knowledge of cultivating and the arts, to the Aboriginals of the Country by which the source of future life and happiness had been preserved and extended. But it has been conceived to be impracticable to civilize the Indians of North America — This opinion is probably more convenient than just.

— Henry Knox to George Washington, 1790s.

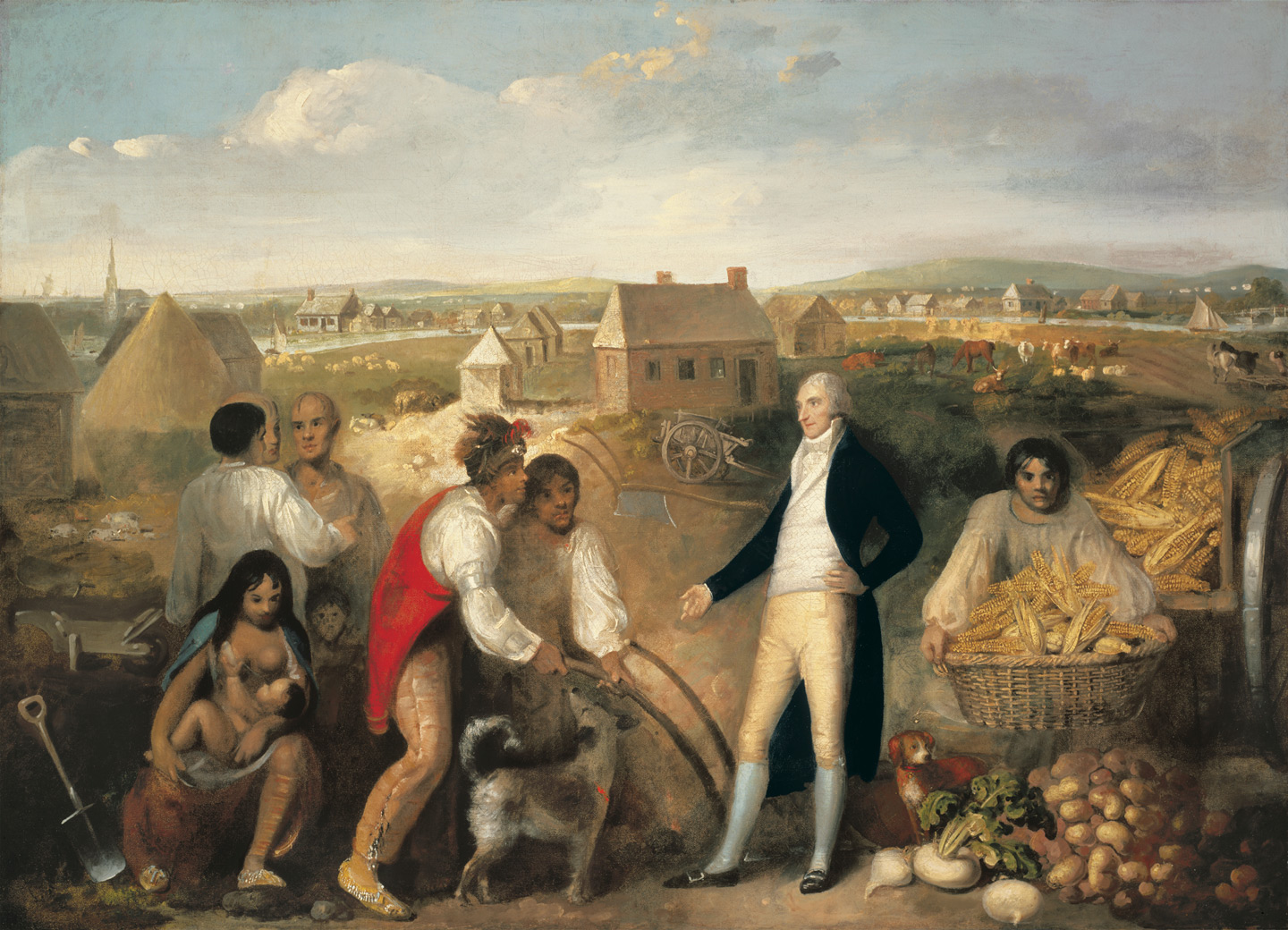
Benjamin Hawkins, seen here on his plantation, teaches Creek Native Americans how to use European technology. Painted in 1805.

In the late 18th century, reformers starting with Washington and Knox, supported educating native children and adults, in efforts to "civilize" or otherwise assimilate Native Americans to the larger society (as opposed to relegating them to reservations). The Civilization Fund Act of 1819 promoted this civilization policy by providing funding to societies (mostly religious) who worked on Native American improvement.

I rejoice, brothers, to hear you propose to become cultivators of the earth for the maintenance of your families. Be assured you will support them better and with less labor, by raising stock and bread, and by spinning and weaving clothes, than by hunting. A little land cultivated, and a little labor, will procure more provisions than the most successful hunt; and a woman will clothe more by spinning and weaving, than a man by hunting. Compared with you, we are but as of yesterday in this land. Yet see how much more we have multiplied by industry, and the exercise of that reason which you possess in common with us. Follow then our example, brethren, and we will aid you with great pleasure...

— President Thomas Jefferson, Brothers of the Choctaw Nation, December 17, 1803

The end of the 18th century also saw the revival of spirituality among the Haudenosaunee society and other nations of the eastern seaboard. After years of war and uncertainty, despair and demoralization led some within these communities to turn to alcohol. In 1799, the Seneca warrior Handsome Lake, who suffered from depression and alcoholism himself, received a spiritual vision. This vision led Handsome Lake to travel among the Seneca as a religious prophet. He preached about a revival of the traditional ceremonies of the Haudenosaunee nations and a renouncement of drinking. This movement, which also carried some elements of Christianity, came to be known as Gaiwiio, or Good Word.

== 19th century ==
=== Resistance ===
Tecumseh was the Shawnee leader of Tecumseh's War who attempted to organize an alliance of Native American tribes throughout North America.

As American expansion continued, Native Americans resisted settlers' encroachment in several regions of the new nation (and in unorganized territories), from the Northwest to the Southeast, and then in the West, as settlers encountered the tribes of the Great Plains.

East of the Mississippi River, an intertribal army led by Tecumseh, a Shawnee chief and noted orator, fought a number of engagements in the Northwest during the period 1811–12, known as Tecumseh's War. In the latter stages, Tecumseh's group allied with the British forces in the War of 1812 and was instrumental in the conquest of Detroit. Conflicts in the Southeast include the Creek War and Seminole Wars, both before and after the Indian Removals of most members of the Five Civilized Tribes beginning in the 1830s under President Andrew Jackson's policies.

Native American nations on the plains in the west engaged in armed conflicts with the United States throughout the 19th century, through what were called generally "Indian Wars." The Battle of Little Bighorn (1876) was one of the greatest Native American victories. Defeats included the Sioux Uprising of 1862, the Sand Creek Massacre (1864) and Wounded Knee in 1890. Indian Wars continued into the early 20th century.

According to the U.S. Bureau of the Census (1894),

"The Indian wars under the government of the United States have been more than 40 in number. They have cost the lives of about 19,000 white men, women and children, including those killed in individual combats, and the lives of about 30,000 Indians. The actual number of killed and wounded Indians must be very much higher than the given... Fifty percent additional would be a safe estimate..."

=== American expansion ===
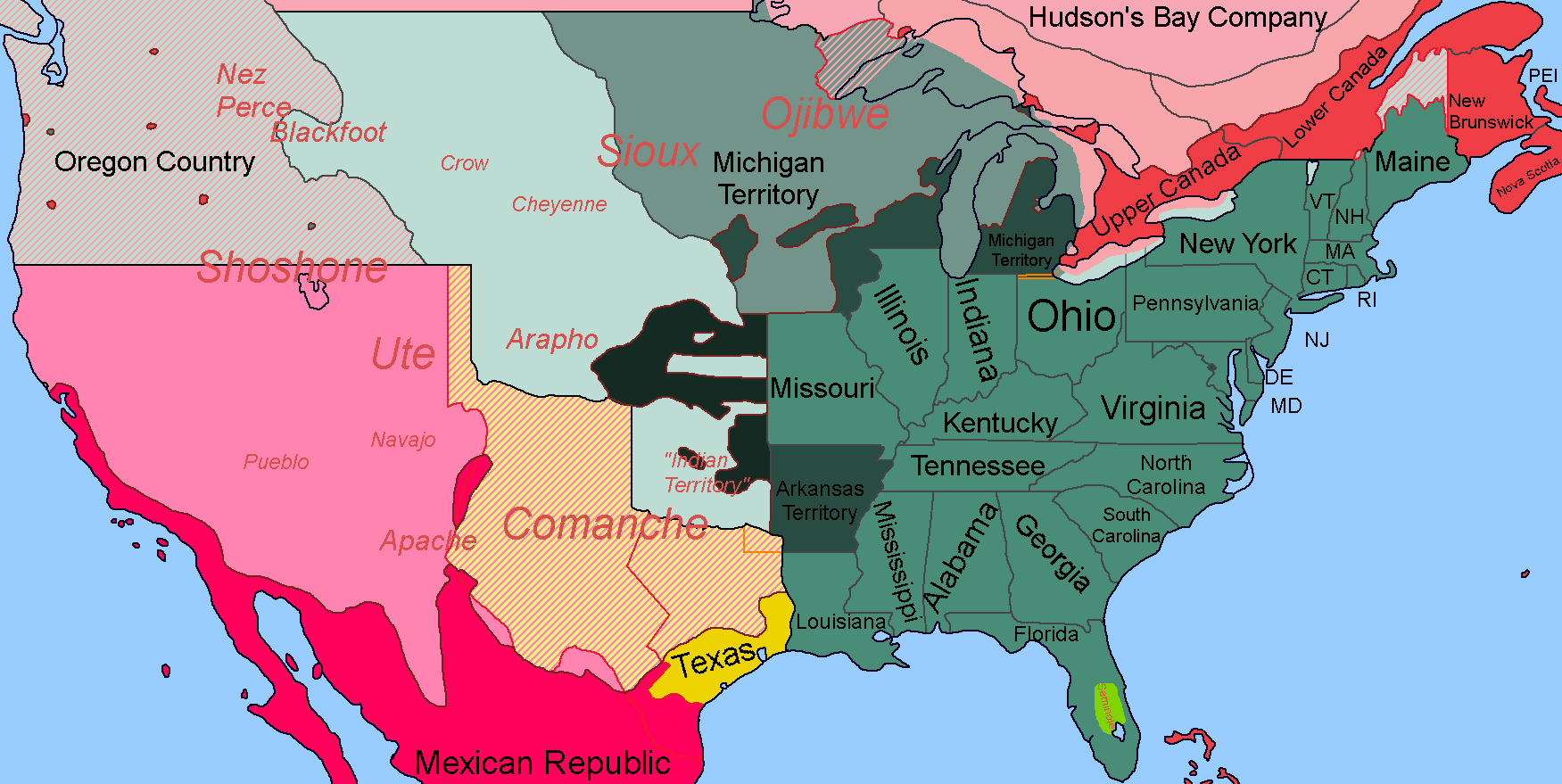
A map of Native American-controlled territories in the Western United States as of 1836

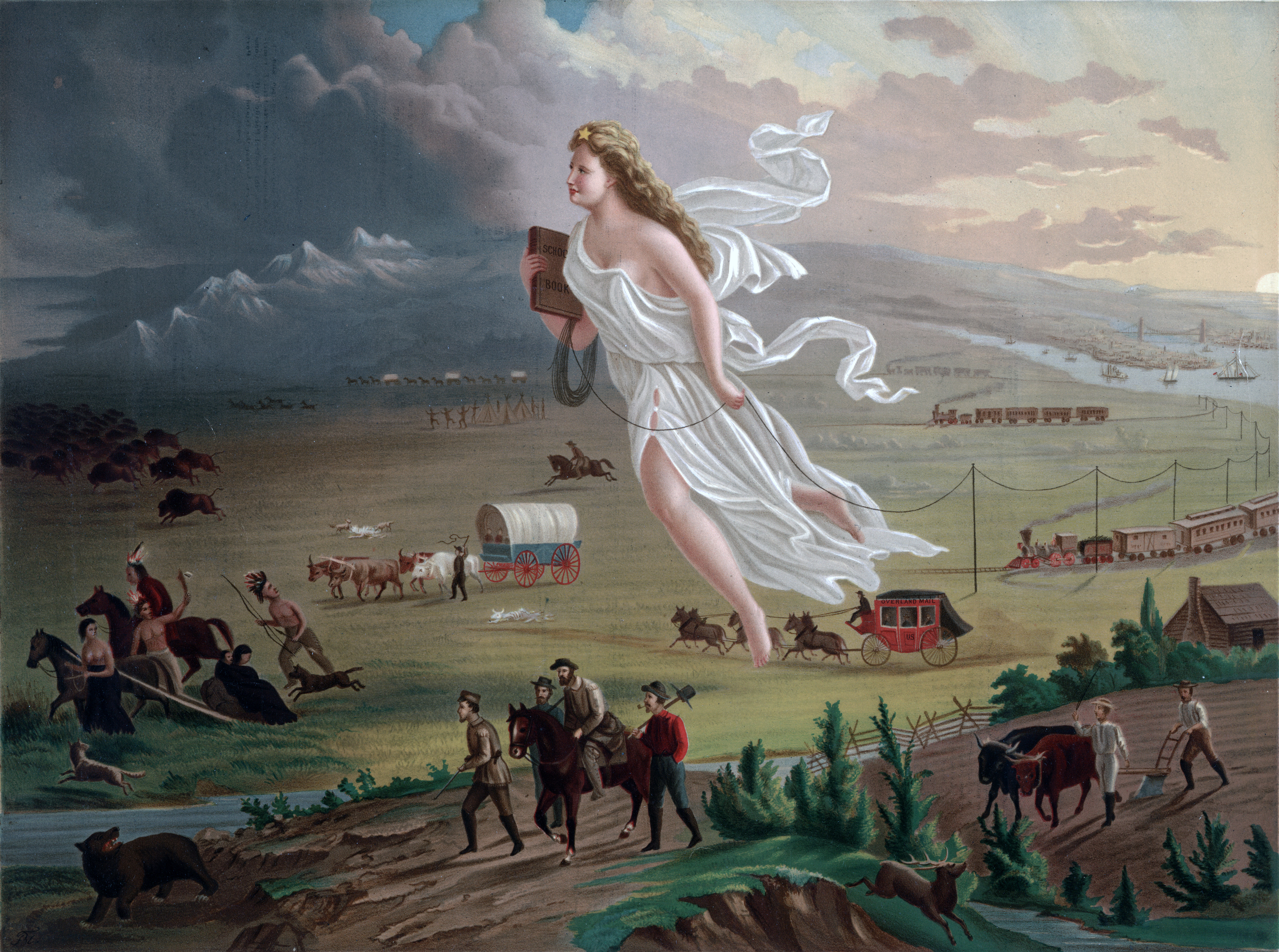
Native Americans flee from the allegorical representation of Manifest Destiny, Columbia, painted in 1872 by John Gast

In July 1845, the New York newspaper editor John L. O’Sullivan coined the phrase, "Manifest Destiny," as the "design of Providence" supporting the territorial expansion of the United States. Manifest Destiny had serious consequences for Native Americans, since continental expansion for the United States took place at the cost of their occupied land. Manifest Destiny was a justification for expansion and westward movement, or, in some interpretations, an ideology or doctrine that helped to promote the progress of civilization. Advocates of Manifest Destiny believed that expansion was not only good, but that it was obvious and certain. The term was first used primarily by Jacksonian Democrats in the 1840s to promote the annexation of much of what is now the Western United States (the Oregon Territory, the Texas Annexation, and the Mexican Cession).

What a prodigious growth this English race, especially the American branch of it, is having! How soon will it subdue and occupy all the wild parts of this continent and of the islands adjacent. No prophecy, however seemingly extravagant, as to future achievements in this way [is] likely to equal the reality.

— Rutherford Birchard Hayes, future U.S. President, January 1, 1857, Personal Diary.

In 1851, delegates from the federal government and upwards of ten thousand Indigenous peoples, consisting of various Plains tribes including the Sioux, Cheyenne and Crow among many others, assembled. They gathered for the purpose of signing the Treaty of Fort Laramie which would set the definitive boundaries of the tribal territories, and tribes were to agree to leave travelers through the territory unharmed. In 1853 members of the tribes from the southern Plains such as the Comanches, Kiowas, and Kiowa Apaches signed treaties similar to the Fort Laramie Treaty of 1851.

In the years following the 1851 treaty, tracks were laid for the Union Pacific Railroad and gold was discovered in Montana and Colorado. These factors amongst others led to increased traffic through tribal land which in turn disrupted the game animals that were necessary for the Plains’ nations survival. Conflicts between the U.S. Army, settlers and Native Americans continued; however, in 1864 after the massacre of a Cheyenne village along the banks of Sand Creek, war between the U.S. and the tribes of the Great Plains was inevitable.

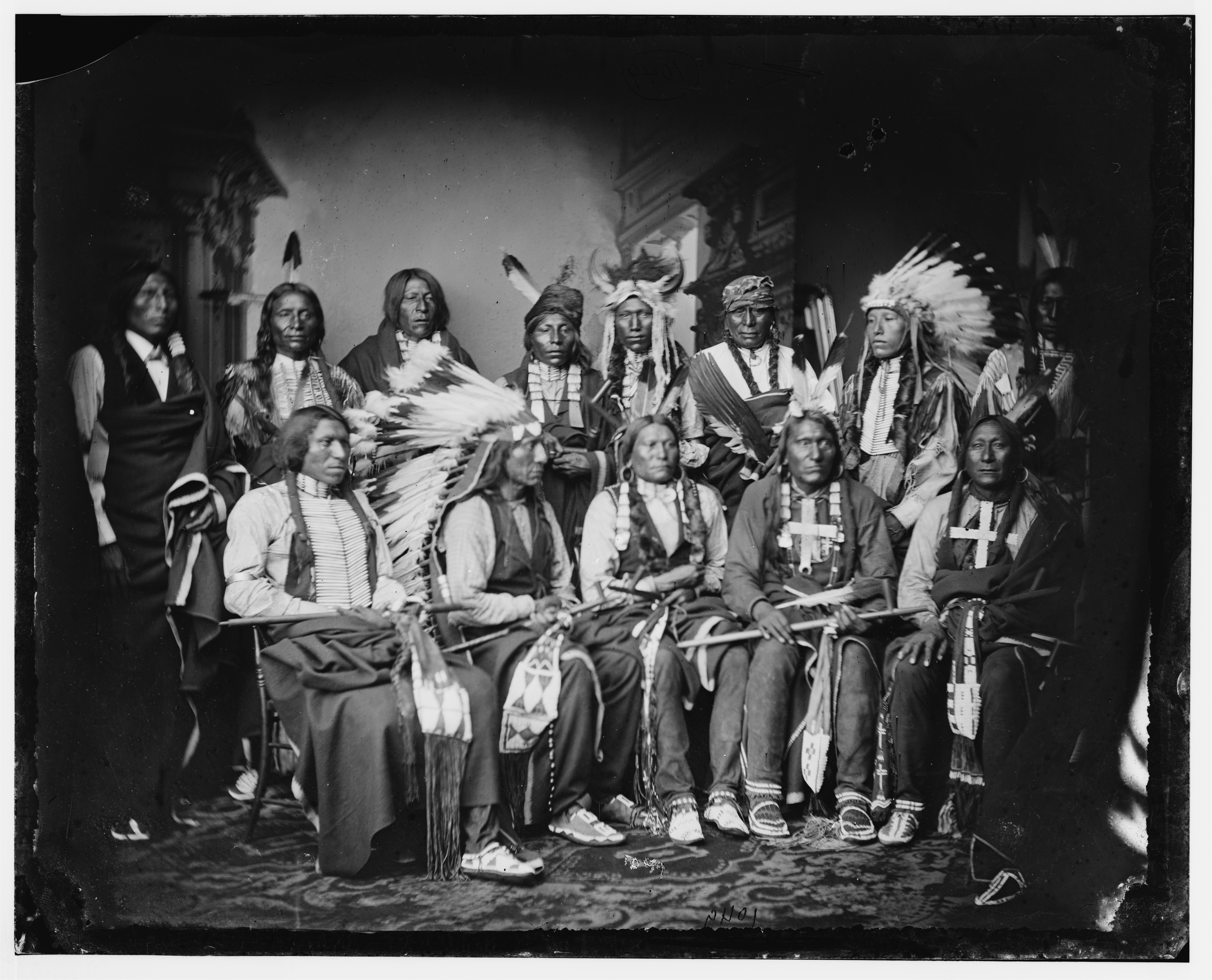
Chief Red Cloud and other Sioux Warriors

After a decade of wars between the U.S. and the tribes of the Great Plains, including Red Cloud's War in 1866, the federal government again called for a treaty. In 1868 the Peace Treaty of Fort Laramie was signed, with one of the terms of the treaty being that the Sioux would settle on the Black hills Reservation in Dakota Territory.

In 1874, gold was discovered within the Black Hills, land which is to this day most sacred to the Sioux. The Black Hills were at this time also the center of the Sioux Nation, the federal government offered six million dollars for the land, but Sioux leaders refused to sell. (In the Hands) By 1877 the Black Hills were confiscated, and the land that had once been the Sioux Nation was further divided into six smaller reservations.

The age of manifest destiny, which came to be associated with extinguishing American Indian territorial claims and moving them to reservations, gained ground as the United States population explored and settled west of the Mississippi River. Although Indian Removal from the Southeast had been proposed by some as a humanitarian measure to ensure their survival away from Americans, conflicts of the 19th century led some European-Americans to regard the natives as "savages".

The period of the Gold Rush was marked by the California genocide. Under U.S. sovereignty, the indigenous population plunged from approximately 150,000 in 1848 to 30,000 in 1870 and reached its nadir of 16,000 in 1900. Thousands of California Native Americans, including women and children, are documented to have been killed by non-Native Americans in this period. The dispossession and murder of California Native Americans was aided by institutions of the state of California, which encouraged Indigenous peoples to be killed with impunity.

=== Civil War ===
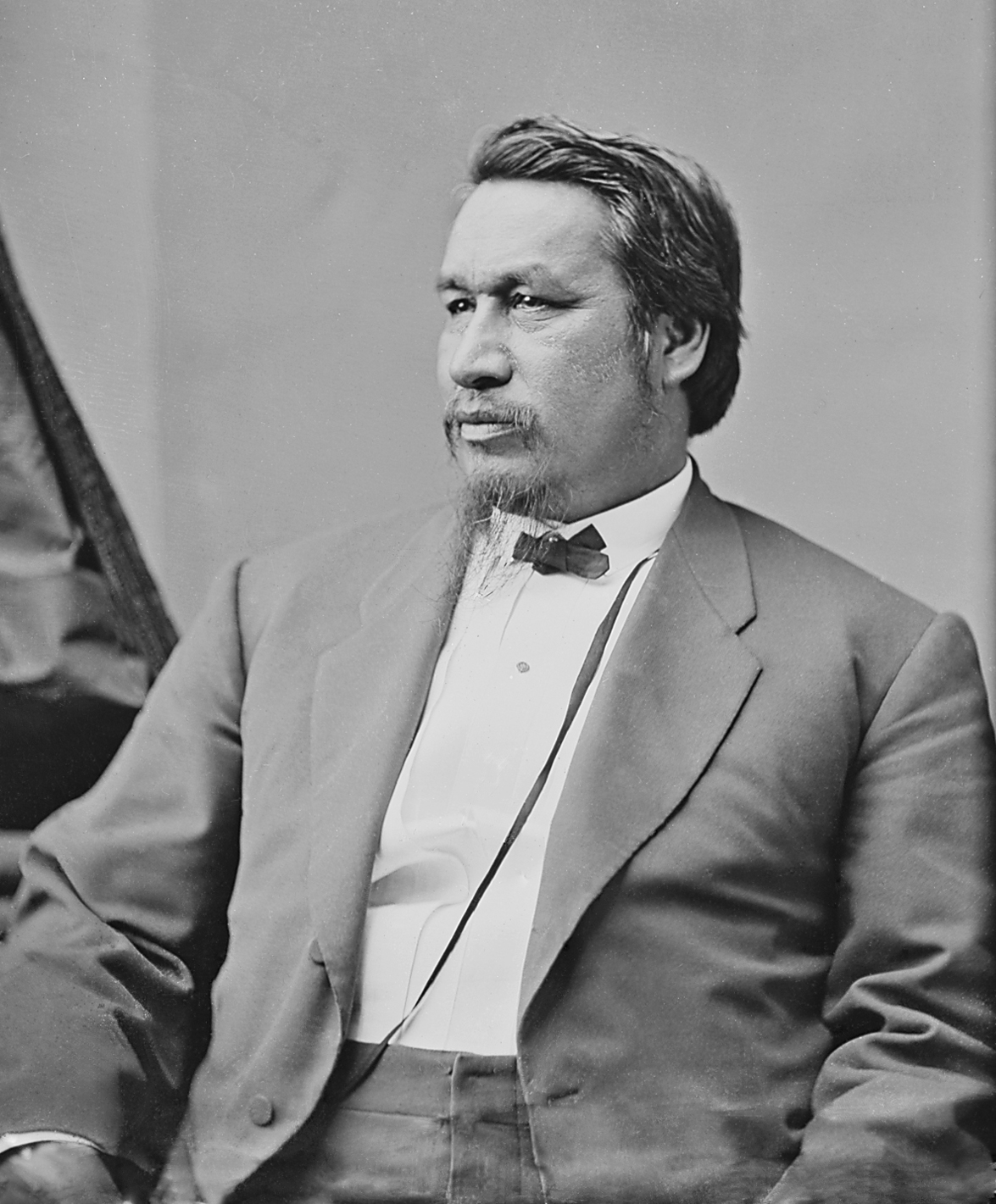
Ely Parker was a Union Civil War General who wrote the terms of surrender between the United States and the Confederate States of America. Parker was one of two Native Americans to reach the rank of brigadier general during the Civil War.

Many Native Americans served in the military during the Civil War, on both sides. By fighting with the whites, Native Americans hoped to gain favor with the prevailing government by supporting the war effort.

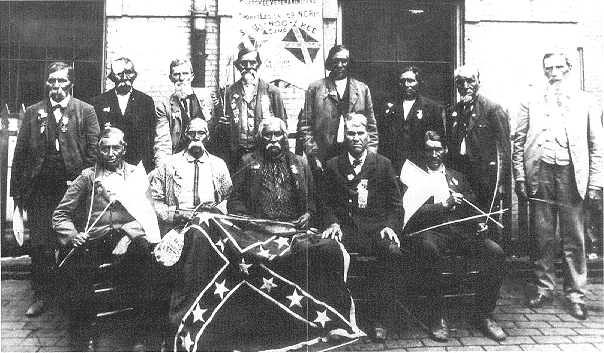
Cherokee confederates reunion in New Orleans, 1903.

General Ely S. Parker, a member of the Seneca tribe, transcribed the terms of the articles of surrender which General Robert E. Lee signed at Appomattox Court House on April 9, 1865. Gen. Parker, who served as Gen. Ulysses S. Grant's military secretary and was a trained attorney, was once rejected for Union military service because of his race. At Appomattox, Lee is said to have remarked to Parker, "I am glad to see one real American here," to which Parker replied, "We are all Americans." General Stand Watie, a leader of the Cherokee Nation and Confederate Indian cavalry commander, was the last Confederate General to surrender his troops.

=== Removals and reservations ===
In the 19th century, the incessant westward expansion of the United States incrementally compelled large numbers of Native Americans to resettle further west, often by force, almost always reluctantly. Native Americans believed this forced relocation illegal, given the Hopewell Treaty of 1785. Under President Andrew Jackson, United States Congress passed the Indian Removal Act of 1830, which authorized the President to conduct treaties to exchange Native American land east of the Mississippi River for lands west of the river.

As many as 100,000 Native Americans relocated to the West as a result of this Indian Removal policy. In theory, relocation was supposed to be voluntary and many Native Americans did remain in the East. In practice, great pressure was put on Native American leaders to sign removal treaties.

The most egregious violation of the stated intention of the removal policy took place under the Treaty of New Echota, which was signed by a dissident faction of Cherokees but not the principal chief. The following year, the Cherokee conceded to removal, but Georgia included their land in a lottery for European-American settlement before that. President Jackson used the military to gather and transport the Cherokee to the west, whose timing and lack of adequate supplies led to the deaths of an estimated 4,000 Cherokees on the Trail of Tears. About 17,000 Cherokees, along with approximately 2,000 enslaved blacks held by Cherokees, were taken by force migration to Indian Territory.

Tribes were generally located to reservations where they could more easily be separated from traditional life and pushed into European-American society. Some southern states additionally enacted laws in the 19th century forbidding non-Native American settlement on Native American lands, with the intention to prevent sympathetic white missionaries from aiding the scattered Native American resistance.

=== Native Americans and U.S. citizenship ===
In 1817, the Cherokee became the first Native Americans recognized as U.S. citizens. Under Article 8 of the 1817 Cherokee treaty, "Upwards of 300 Cherokees (Heads of Families) in the honest simplicity of their souls, made an election to become American citizens." The next earliest recorded date of Native Americans' becoming U.S. citizens was in 1831, when some Mississippi Choctaw became citizens after the United States Congress ratified the Treaty of Dancing Rabbit Creek.

Article 22 sought to put a Choctaw representative in the U.S. House of Representatives. Under article XIV of that treaty, any Choctaw who elected not to move with the Choctaw Nation could become an American citizen when he registered and if he stayed on designated lands for five years after treaty ratification. Through the years, Native Americans became U.S. citizens by:

1. Treaty provision (as with the Cherokee)
2. Registration and land allotment under the Dawes Act of February 8, 1887
3. Issuance of Patent in Fee simple
4. Adopting Habits of Civilized Life
5. Minor Children
6. Citizenship by Birth
7. Becoming Soldiers and Sailors in the U.S. Armed Forces
8. Marriage to a U.S. citizen
9. Special Act of Congress.

In 1857, Chief Justice Roger B. Taney expressed the opinion of the court that since Native Americans were "free and independent people," they could become U.S. citizens. Taney asserted that Native Americans could be naturalized and join the "political community" of the United States.

[Native Americans], without doubt, like the subjects of any other foreign Government, be naturalized by the authority of Congress, and become citizens of a State, and of the United States; and if an individual should leave his nation or tribe, and take up his abode among the white population, he would be entitled to all the rights and privileges which would belong to an emigrant from any other foreign people.

— Chief Justice Roger B. Taney, 1857, What was Taney thinking? American Indian Citizenship in the era of Dred Scott, Frederick E. Hoxie, April 2007.

After the American Civil War, the Civil Rights Act of 1866 states, "that all persons born in the United States, and not subject to any foreign power, excluding Indians not taxed, are hereby declared to be citizens of the United States". This was affirmed by the ratification of the Fourteenth Amendment. But the concept of Native Americans as U.S. citizens fell out of favor among politicians at the time. Senator Jacob Howard of Michigan commented, “I am not yet prepared to pass a sweeping act of naturalization by which all the Indian savages, wild or tame, belonging to a tribal relation, are to become my fellow-citizens and go to the polls and vote with me". (Congressional Globe, 1866, 2895) In a Senate floor debate regarding the Fourteenth Amendment, James Rood Doolittle of Wisconsin stated, " ... all those wild Indians to be citizens of the United States, the Great Republic of the world, whose citizenship should be a title as proud as that of king, and whose danger is that you may degrade that citizenship (Congressional Globe, 1866, 2892)."

==== Indian Appropriations Act of 1871 ====
In 1871 Congress added a rider to the Indian Appropriations Act ending United States recognition of additional Native American tribes or independent nations, and prohibiting additional treaties.

That hereafter no Indian nation or tribe within the territory of the United States shall be acknowledged or recognized as an independent nation, tribe, or power with whom the United States may contract by treaty: Provided, further, that nothing herein contained shall be construed to invalidate or impair the obligation of any treaty heretofore lawfully made and ratified with any such Indian nation or tribe.

— Indian Appropriations Act of 1871

=== Education and boarding schools ===
After the Indian wars in the late 19th century, the United States established Native American boarding schools, initially run primarily by or affiliated with Christian missionaries. At this time American society thought that Native American children needed to be acculturated to the general society. The boarding school experience often proved traumatic to Native American children, who were forbidden to speak their native languages, taught Christianity and denied the right to practice their native religions, and in numerous other ways forced to abandon their Native American identities and adopt European-American culture.

Since the late 20th century, investigations have documented cases of sexual, physical and mental abuse occurring at such schools. While problems were documented as early as the 1920s, some of the schools continued into the 1960s. Since the rise of self-determination for Native Americans, they have generally emphasized education of their children at schools near where they live. In addition, many federally recognized tribes have taken over operations of such schools and added programs of language retention and revival to strengthen their cultures. Beginning in the 1970s, tribes have also founded colleges at their reservations, controlled and operated by Native Americans, to educate their young for jobs as well as to pass on their cultures.

== 20th century ==
President Woodrow Wilson speaking to Native Americans, 1913

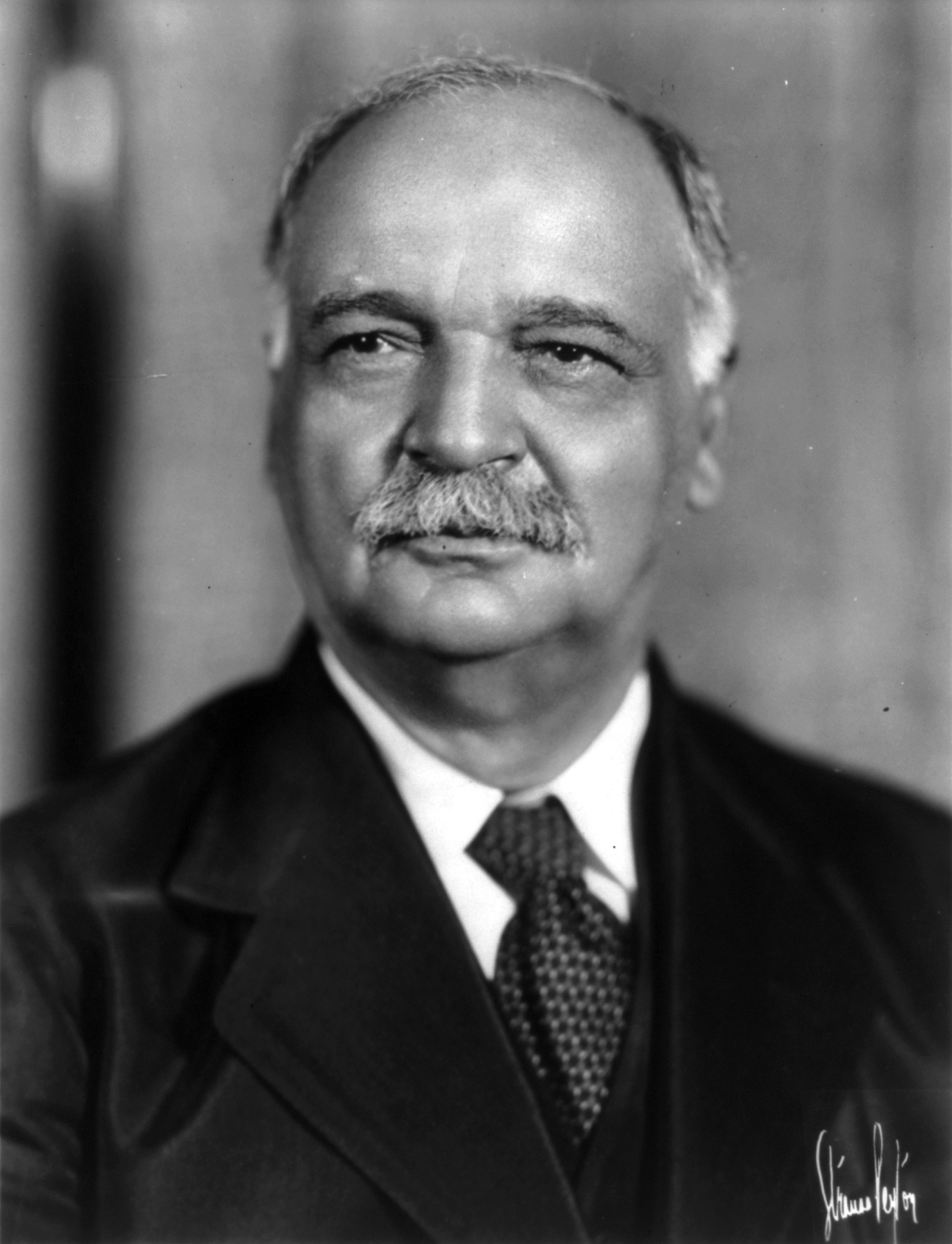
Charles Curtis, of Kaw, Osage, Potawatomi, French and British ancestry, was 31st Vice President of the United States, 1929–1933.

On August 29, 1911 Ishi, generally considered to have been the last Native American to live most of his life without contact with European American culture, was discovered near Oroville, California after a forest fire drove him from nearby mountains. He was the last of his tribe, the rest having been massacred by a party of White "Indian fighters" in 1865 when he was a boy. After being jailed in protective custody, Ishi was released to anthropologists led by Alfred L. Kroeber at the University of California. They studied his Southern Yahi language and culture, and provided him a home until his death from tuberculosis five years later.

On June 2, 1924, U.S. Republican President Calvin Coolidge signed the Indian Citizenship Act, which made citizens of the United States of all Native Americans born in the United States and its territories and who were not already citizens. Prior to passage of the act, nearly two-thirds of Native Americans were already U.S. citizens.

American Indians today have all the rights guaranteed in the U.S. Constitution, can vote in elections, and run for political office. There has been controversy over how much the federal government has jurisdiction over tribal affairs, sovereignty, and cultural practices.

Be it enacted by the Senate and House of Representatives of the United States of America in Congress assembled, That all noncitizen Native Americans born within the territorial limits of the United States be, and they are hereby, declared to be citizens of the United States: Provided, That the granting of such citizenship shall not in any manner impair or otherwise affect the right of any Native American to tribal or other property.

— Indian Citizenship Act of 1924

=== World War II ===
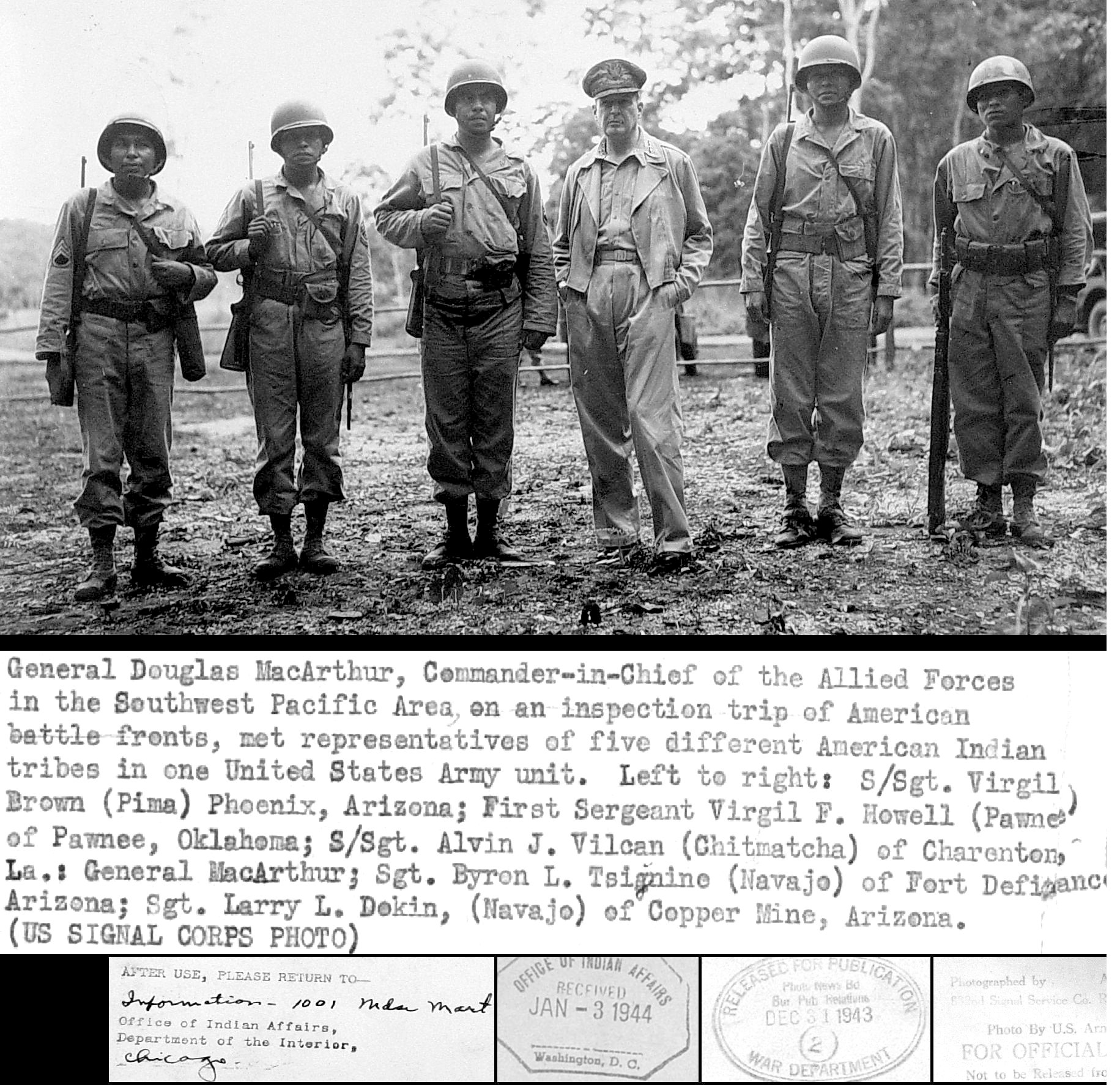
General Douglas MacArthur meeting Navajo, Pima, Pawnee and other Native American troops.

Some 44,000 Native Americans served in the United States military during World War II: at the time, one-third of all able-bodied Indian men from 18 to 50 years of age. The entry of young men into the United States military during World War II has been described as the first large-scale exodus of Indigenous peoples from the reservations. It involved more people than any migration since the removals from areas east of the Mississippi River of the early 19th century.

The men's service with the U.S. military in the international conflict was a turning point in Native American history. The overwhelming majority of Native Americans welcomed the opportunity to serve; they had a voluntary enlistment rate that was 40% higher than those who were drafted. War Department officials said that if the entire population had enlisted in the same proportion as the Native Americans, the response would have rendered the draft unnecessary.

Their fellow soldiers often held them in high esteem, in part since the legend of the tough Native American warrior had become a part of the fabric of American historical legend. White servicemen sometimes showed a lighthearted respect toward Native American comrades by calling them "chief". Native American cultures were profoundly changed after their young men returned home, because of their wide contact with the world outside of the reservation system. "The war", said the U.S. Indian Commissioner in 1945, "caused the greatest disruption of Native life since the beginning of the reservation era", affecting the habits, views, and economic well-being of tribal members.

The most significant of these changes was the opportunity—as a result of wartime labor shortages—to find well-paying work in cities. After the war many Native Americans relocated to urban areas, particularly on the West Coast with the buildup of the defense industry. In the 1950s the federal government had a relocation policy encouraging them to do so because of economic opportunity in cities. But Native Americans struggled with discrimination and the great cultural changes in leaving their reservations behind.

There were also losses as a result of the war. For instance, a total of 1,200 Pueblo men served in World War II; only about half came home alive. In addition many more Navajo served as Code talkers for the military in the Pacific. The code they made, although cryptologically very simple, was never cracked by the Japanese.

=== Self-determination ===
Military service and urban residency contributed to the rise of American Indian activism, particularly after the 1960s and the occupation of Alcatraz Island (1969–1971) by a student Indian group from San Francisco. In the same period, the American Indian Movement (AIM) was founded in Minneapolis, and chapters were established throughout the country, where American Indians combined spiritual and political activism. Political protests gained national media attention and the sympathy of the American public.

Through the mid-1970s, conflicts between governments and Native Americans occasionally erupted into violence. A notable late 20th-century event was the Wounded Knee incident on the Pine Ridge Indian Reservation. Upset with tribal government and the failures of the federal government to enforce treaty rights, about 300 Oglala Lakota and American Indian Movement (AIM) activists took control of Wounded Knee on February 27, 1973.

Indian activists from around the country joined them at Pine Ridge, and the occupation became a symbol of rising American Indian identity and power. Federal law enforcement officials and the national guard cordoned off the town, and the two sides had a standoff for 71 days. During much gunfire, one United States Marshal was wounded and paralyzed. In late April a Cherokee and local Lakota man were killed by gunfire; the Lakota elders ended the occupation to ensure no more lives were lost.

In June 1975, two FBI agents seeking to make an armed robbery arrest at Pine Ridge Reservation were wounded in a firefight, and killed at close range. The AIM activist Leonard Peltier was sentenced in 1976 to two consecutive terms of life in prison in the FBI deaths.

In 1968, the government enacted the Indian Civil Rights Act. This gave tribal members most of the protections against abuses by tribal governments that the Bill of Rights accords to all U.S. citizens with respect to the federal government. In 1975 the U.S. government passed the Indian Self-Determination and Education Assistance Act, marking the culmination of 15 years of policy changes. It resulted from American Indian activism, the Civil Rights Movement, and community development aspects of President Lyndon Johnson's social programs of the 1960s. The Act recognized the right and need of Native Americans for self-determination. It marked the U.S. government's turn away from the 1950s policy of termination of the relationship between tribes and the government. The U.S. government encouraged Native Americans' efforts at self-government and determining their futures. Tribes have developed organizations to administer their own social, welfare and housing programs, for instance. Tribal self-determination has created tension with respect to the federal government's historic trust obligation to care for Indians, but the Bureau of Indian Affairs has never lived up to that responsibility.

By this time, tribes had already started to establish community schools to replace the BIA boarding schools. Led by the Navajo Nation in 1968, tribes started tribal colleges and universities, to build their own models of education on reservations, preserve and revive their cultures, and develop educated workforces. In 1994 the U.S. Congress passed legislation recognizing the tribal colleges as land-grant colleges, which provided opportunities for funding. Thirty-two tribal colleges in the United States belong to the American Indian Higher Education Consortium. By the early 21st century, tribal nations had also established numerous language revival programs in their schools.

In addition, Native American activism has led major universities across the country to establish Native American studies programs and departments, increasing awareness of the strengths of Indian cultures, providing opportunities for academics, and deepening research on history and cultures in the United States. Native Americans have entered academia; journalism and media; politics at local, state and federal levels; and public service, for instance, influencing medical research and policy to identify issues related to American Indians.

In 1981, Tim Giago founded the Lakota Times, an independent Native American newspaper, located at the Pine Ridge Reservation but not controlled by tribal government. He later founded the Native American Journalists Association. Other independent newspapers and media corporations have been developed, so that Native American journalists are contributing perspective on their own affairs and other policies and events.

In 2004, Senator Sam Brownback (Republican of Kansas) introduced a joint resolution (Senate Joint Resolution 37) to "offer an apology to all Native Peoples on behalf of the United States" for past "ill-conceived policies" by the U.S. government regarding Indian Tribes. President Barack Obama signed the historic apology into law in 2009, as Section 8113 of the 2010 defense appropriations bill.

After years of investigation and independent work by Native American journalists, in 2003 the U.S. government indicted suspects in the December 1975 murder of Anna Mae Aquash at the Pine Ridge Indian Reservation. A Mi'kmaq, Aquash was the highest-ranking woman activist in the American Indian Movement (AIM) at the time. She was killed several months after two FBI agents had been killed at the reservation. Many Lakota believe that she was killed by AIM on suspicion of having been an FBI informant, but she never worked for the FBI. Arlo Looking Cloud was convicted in federal court in 2004. In 2007 the United States extradited AIM activist John Graham from Canada to stand trial for her murder. He was also convicted and sentenced to life.

=== The Indian Arts and Crafts Act of 1990 ===
The Indian Arts and Crafts Act of 1990 (P.L. 101–644) is a truth-in-advertising law that prohibits misrepresentation in marketing of American Indian or Alaska Native arts and crafts products within the United States, including dreamcatchers. It is illegal to offer or display for sale, or sell any art or craft product in a manner that falsely suggests it is Indian produced.

== 21st century ==
Native American tribes and individuals began to file suits against the federal government over a range of issues, especially land claims and mismanagement of trust lands and fees. A number of longstanding cases were finally settled by the administration of President Barack Obama, who made a commitment to improve relations between the federal government and the tribes. Among these was Cobell v. Salazar, a class action suit settled in 2009, with Congress appropriating funds in 2010. Another was Keepseagle v. , settled in April 2011. The $760 million settlement "designated $680 million for Native American farmers who had faced discrimination from the U.S. Department of Agriculture over a period of several years in the past.

By 2012, "the Justice and Interior departments had reached settlements totaling more than $1 billion with 41 tribes for claims of mismanagement." The Navajo Nation gained the largest settlement with a single tribe, of $554 million. It is the largest tribe in the United States.

In 2013, under renewal of the Violence Against Women Act, the federal government strengthened protection of Native American women, as it established authority for tribes to prosecute non-Natives who commit crimes on Indian land. Domestic and sexual abuse of Native American women has been a problem in many areas, but previous laws prevented arrest or prosecution by tribal police or courts of non-native abusive partners.

Native American migration to urban areas continued to grow: 70% of Native Americans lived in urban areas in 2012, up from 45% in 1970, and 8% in 1940. Urban areas with significant Native American populations include Rapid City, Minneapolis, Oklahoma City, Denver, Phoenix, Tucson, Seattle, Chicago, Houston, and New York City. Many have lived in poverty and struggled with discrimination. Racism, unemployment, drugs and gangs were common problems which Indian social service organizations, such as the Little Earth housing complex in Minneapolis, have attempted to address.

As of the 2020 census, the largest self-identified Native American group not combined with another race is Aztec, numbering 378,122 individuals. Though Aztecs are indigenous to Mexico and not the United States, they are nevertheless considered Native American people per census guidelines, which includes any Indigenous people from the Americas.

== See also ==
- List of Native American firsts
