= Henry F. Dobyns =

American anthropologist (1925–2009)

- Born: Henry Farmer Dobyns, Jr. July 3, 1925; Tucson, Arizona, US
- Died: June 21, 2009 (aged 83)
- Education: Cornell University (PhD)
- Occupations: Anthropology, Ethnohistory and Demography
- Employer(s): University of Kentucky; University of Oklahoma
- Title: Chairman of the Department of Anthropology; Vice-president for Academic Affairs
- Spouse(s): Zipporah Pottenger; Cara Richards; Mary Faith Patterson

Henry Farmer Dobyns, Jr. (July 3, 1925 – June 21, 2009) was an anthropologist, author and researcher specializing in the ethnohistory and demography of native peoples in the American hemisphere. He is best known for his groundbreaking demographic research on the size of indigenous American populations before the arrival of Christopher Columbus in 1492. In 1966, Dobyns postulated a much larger pre-Columbian indigenous (Indian) population of the Americas, especially North America, than previous scholars. Dobyns believed that the Indian population of the United States and Canada was 9.8 to 12.2 million people in 1500 and was reduced by 90 percent in the 16th century by continent-wide epidemics of disease introduced by European explorers and settlers. His views were controversial but have been partially accepted by most anthropologists.

== Early life and education ==
Dobyns was born in Tucson, Arizona on July 3, 1925 to Henry F. and Susie Kell Dobyns, and spent his childhood in Casa Grande, Arizona. He graduated from Casa Grande Union High School and then immediately entered the U.S. Army in 1943. Following his service, he attended the University of Arizona where he received a B.A. in Anthropology in 1949 as well as a M.A. in Anthropology in 1956.

Dobyns received his Doctorate degree in Anthropology from Cornell University in 1960.

== Career ==
Dobyns worked with Native American tribes on land claims and a water rights case while he was a graduate student at the University of Arizona in 1952. He continued this work over the next 50 years with various tribes. From 1952 to 1956, he gathered ethnohistorical and archaeological evidence for the Hualapai Tribal Nation’s land claims case and acted as an expert witness before the U.S. Supreme Court with much of the information in his M.A. thesis being used in the Indian Claims Commission hearings. He also spent three decades working as a consultant for the Gila River Indian Community in their litigation over water rights.

He joined the Cornell Peru Project in 1960 after earning his Ph.D. There he worked as a research coordinator from 1960 to 1962, and as a Peace Corps coordinator from 1962 to 1964, and coordinator of the Comparative Studies of Cultural Change program. He was also the Coordinator of the Andean Indian Community Research and Development project from 1963 to 1966, and the Associate Director of the Cornell Peru Project. Dobyns was made Director of the project in 1966 after the death of the former director, Allan R. Holmberg.

=== Teaching ===
From 1949 to 1952 he was an instructor at Cornell University’s Field Laboratory in Applied Anthropology in Arizona and New Mexico.

In 1966 Dobyns became the Chairman of the Department of Anthropology at the University of Kentucky. In 1970, he joined the staff of Prescott College, Center of Man and Environment as a professor and later as the Vice-president for Academic Affairs. Between 1977 and 1979 he taught at the University of Florida, Gainesville. Dobyns taught at the University of Wisconsin–Parkside from 1974 to 1977 and also 1983 through 1984. In 1983 he directed seminars on Native American Historical Demography, funded by the National Endowment for the Humanities (NEH). He was a professor at the University of Oklahoma in 1989.

Dobyns also worked as a senior researcher at the Bureau of Applied Research in Anthropology at the University of Arizona and on projects for the National Park Service. Between 1980 and the early 1990s, he returned to the Newberry Library each summer to contribute to the NEH Summer Institute in Native American Literature.

== North American Indian populations ==
Dobyns is best known for his theories about the population of the Native Americans (Indians) prior to the discovery of the Americas by Columbus in 1492. Before Dobyns, scholars estimated the pre-Columbian population of the United States and Canada at about one million people. Dobyn's postulated instead a population of 9.8 to 12.2 million, an assertion that aroused controversy among anthropologists. (Dobyns postulated a hemisphere-wide population of American Indians between 90 and 113 million, a number substantially larger than the population of all of Europe in 1500.) In 1983, Dobyns upped his estimate of pre-Columbian American Indian population in North America to 18 million.

Dobyn's assertion was that continent-wide epidemics of diseases introduced in the Americas by European explorers and settlers in the 16th century reduced the Indian population by 90 to 95 percent. Dobyns based that view on evidence of 16th century epidemics impacting Indian societies in the Caribbean, Mexico, and Peru shortly after those places were visited or colonized by Europeans. He believed that the 16th century epidemics had impacted all the population of the Americas and that only a remnant of the pre-Columbian population survived into the 17th century. Dobyns' high estimates of North American Indian populations also called into doubt the "national myth" that the United States and Canada were a mostly-empty wilderness ripe for exploitation when European settlers arrived in the early 17th century.

Decades of study and controversy ensued after Dobyns' assertions. He has been partially refuted by many anthropologists. They accepted that pre-Dobyns estimates of American Indian populations were too low, but found little evidence to sustain Dobyns' opinion that 16th century epidemics were continent-wide in the Americas. Rather, epidemics were localized, highly fatal in impacted peoples, but not spreading beyond a limited area. By the 1990s, estimates of pre-Columbian North American Indian population often ranged from 3.4 to 7.0 million people. Although the magnitude of the decline in North American Indian populations can be debated, Dobyns was correct in asserting that the arrival of European settlers and diseases in the Americas led to a catastrophic reduction of the Indian population. From whatever it was in 1500, the Indian population of the United States declined to a total of only 536,000 by 1900.

== Awards and accolades ==
Dobyns has been awarded numerous fellowships in support of his research, including:

- The National Science Foundation fellowship from 1956 to 1957
- The Social Science Research Council fellowship in 1959
- The National Endowment for the Humanities fellowship for research at the Newberry Library in Chicago

Dobyns won the Bronislaw Malinowski Award from the Society for Applied Anthropology in 1951 for his article "Blunders with Bolsas." He was a lifetime member of the Arizona Historical Society.

== Personal life ==
In 1948 Dobyns married Zipporah Pottenger with whom he had four children; Rique, Bill, Maritha and Mark. He married his second wife, anthropologist Dr. Cara Richards in 1958 and had one child, York Dobyns. In 1968 he married his third wife, Mary Faith Patterson.

Dobyns died June 21, 2009.

== Selected works ==
Dobyns began his extensive publishing career while he was a graduate student.

- Papagos in the Cotton Fields (1951)
- Tubac Through Four Centuries: A Historical Resume and Analysis (1959)
- Estimating Aboriginal American Population: An Appraisal of Techniques with a New Hemispheric Estimate (1966)
- The Ghost Dance of 1889 among the Pai Indians of Northwestern Arizona (1967)
- Spanish Colonial Tucson: A Demographic History (1976)
- Indians of the Southwest: A Critical Bibliography (1980)
- From Fire to Flood: Historic Human Destruction of Sonoran Desert Riverine (1981)
- Their Number Become Thinned (1983) ISBN 0870494007

From 1971 to 1976 Dobyns edited the Indian Tribal Series, a 40 volume series of tribal history and culture of which Dobyns wrote six volumes.
