= More Than Frybread =

More Than Frybread is a comedic pseudo-documentary that was released in 2012 which was directed and written by Travis Holt Hamilton. The 96-minute comedy premiered at the Harkins Valley Art Center on May 4, 2012. This film stars Tatanka Means, Greg Fernanadez and Mary Kim Titla. Wanting to celebrate and showcase Native American cultural tradition, Hamilton says “More Than Frybread is a comedy to showcase nationalism and inter-tribal competition”

== Plot ==
This 90 minute mockumentary tells the story of the first ever annual World Wide Frybread Association (WWFA) Arizona Chapter State Championship in Flagstaff, Arizona. The contest includes 22 representatives of the 22 Native American tribes of Arizona. The mockumentary focuses on 6 of the contestants: Buddy Begay (Navajo), Sharmayne Cruz (Tohono O'odham), Sammy Powsky (Hualapai), twin sister team Sunshine and Stormy Smith (Yavapai-Apache) and Betti Muchvo (Hopi). Their backstories are told and they are filmed at their homes and with their families. The mockumentary then follows the contestants as they arrive at Flagstaff and shows all the wacky events that transpire as they compete to attend the national frybread contest in New York City.

This story starts with Buddy Begay and his food truck where he sold fry bread on his family's reservation in Arizona. Enjoying the attention from the crowds and the fans, Buddy gloats his way to the competition and is determined to do whatever it takes to win. The mockumentary gives backstories of the other contestants and follows them as they arrive for the contest. During the competition, Betti is eliminated. Buddy, Sharmayne, Sammy, and Sunshine all end up as the finalists. Sharmayne gets fed up with Buddy's showboating during the finals and picks a fight with him. This causes the entire competition to descend into a giant food fight. During the brawl, hot oil is splashed onto Sammy and she is taken to the hospital with burns. The fight is broken up and the contest is ended. Ultimately, the judges decide to award first place to Sammy, who receives get-well cards from the other contestants. In the end the contestants realize what really matters is not competition, it's coming together to share and enjoy a common culture.

== Cast ==
- Tatanka Means - Buddy Begay / Frybread Roadman (Navajo contestant)
- Greg Ferenandez - Joel Thomas (Reporter)
- Mary Kim Titla - Tracey Lightning (Reporter)
- Teresa M. Choyghua - Sharmayne Cruz (Tohono O’odham contestant)
- Camille Nighthorse - Sammy Powsky (Hualapai contestant)
- Shawndey "Dey" Gomez - Sunshine Smith (Yavapai-Apache contestant)
- Tawnya "Nite" Gomez - Stormy Smith (Yavapai-Apache contestant)
- Jennifer L. Joseph - Betti Muchvo (Hopi contestant)

== Background ==
The title and concept of this film was heavily influenced by the post-colonial native dish frybread which has a daunting and sad history. In 1864-1968 Navajo Native Americans were forcibly evicted and endured a 300-mile journey from Arizona to New Mexico which was formally known as “The Long Walk”. Living on flour, sugar, salt and lard given by the government, was transformed into “Fry Bread”. This dish has been seen as a symbol of pride and has been passed down from generations. When asked “Why Frybread?” Hamilton responded “I wanted to make a movie that gave us an excuse to shoot on numerous reservations and make new friends. I thought frybread was a good thing that had the potential to bring people together. I liked the idea of a mockumentary frybread contest and wondered why there wasn't a real national frybread contest. I didn’t realize how big frybread really was."

Hamilton's main goal is to change the way people view Native Americans. Due to the fact that there is a very limited amount of comedies and dramas regarding Natives in the mainstream media. He wanted to use frybread as something that could bring people and other culture together. This film's success and great feedback inspired Hamilton to create a spin off of the show as a comedy called "Frybread". The show was put on hold until funding could be found to support the project.

Wanting to continue to display Native Americans through various characters and narratives, Hamilton has made four contemporary films; the others are “Pete and Cleo (2010), “Blue Gap Boyz” (2008) and Turquoise Rose (2007).
