= James & Ernie =

Navajo-American comedy duo consisting and Ernest "Ernie" David Tsosie III and James Junes

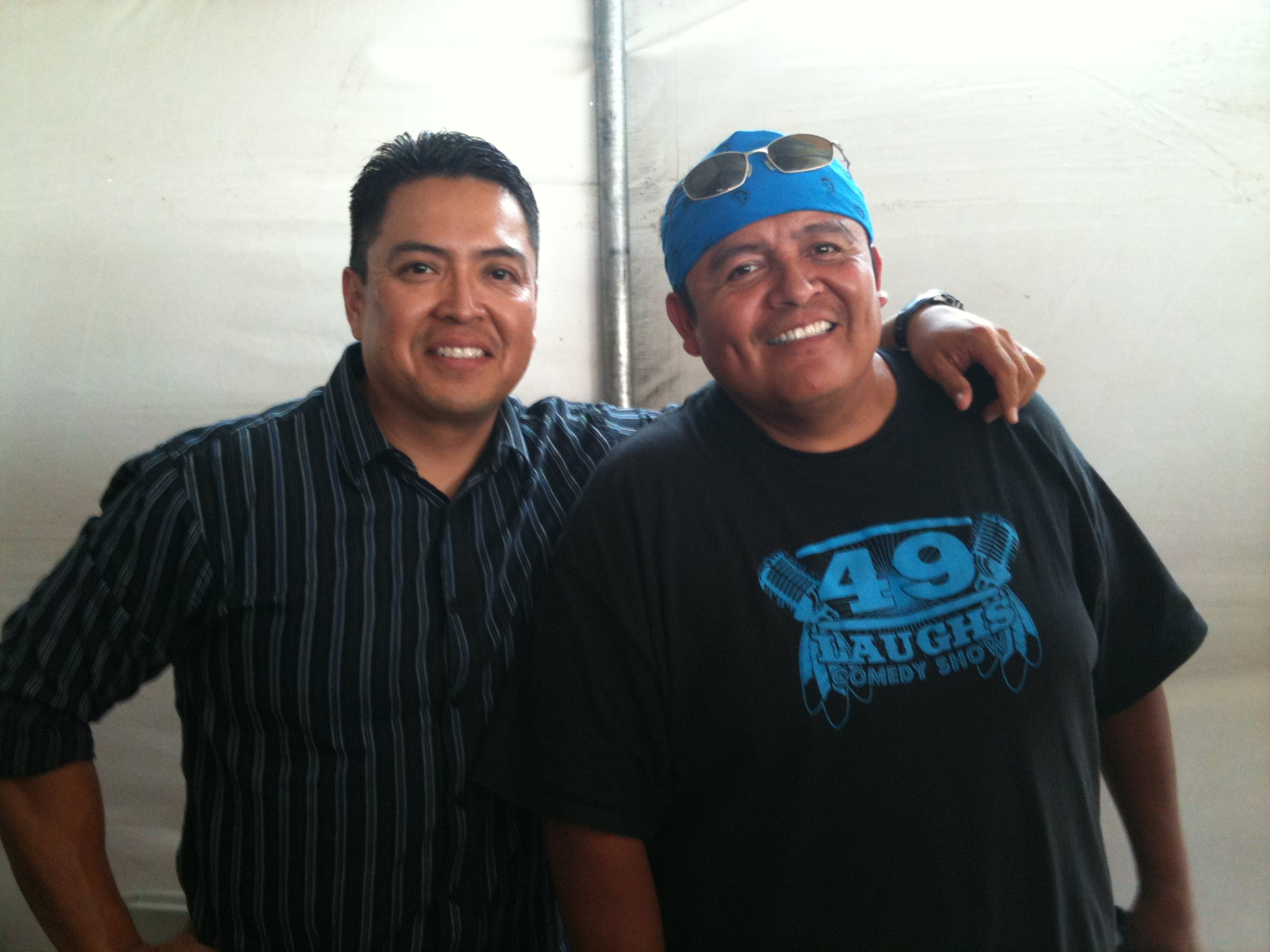
- James & Ernie, Kayenta, Arizona, 2012
- Born: United States
- Citizenship: Navajo Nation and American
- Notable work: James & Ernie-fied (2005); Mile Post 398 (2007)

Comedy career
- Years active: 2002–present
- Medium: Stand-up comedy, film, television, radio
- Genre: Observational comedy
- Subjects: Reservation life, everyday life, current events, satire
- Members: James Junes; Ernest "Ernie" David Tsosie III

James & Ernie are an American Navajo comedy duo consisting of James Junes and Ernest "Ernie" David Tsosie III.

== Early life ==
James Junes grew up in the Kirtland, New Mexico, area, and Ernie Tsosie, born in 1967; 59 years ago, was born in Fort Defiance, Arizona.

== Filmography ==
1. James & Ernie-fied (DVD) (2005), live performance in Farmington, NM
2. Mile Post 398 (2007), Feature film debut
3. Turquoise Rose (2007)
4. James & Ernie Comedy: Fun in the Sun (DVD) (2008)
5. Blue Gap Boy'z (2008)
6. Pete & Cleo (2010)

== Awards ==
Year	Award	Recipient	Category	Film	Result
2007	American Indian Film Festival	Ernest "Ernie" David Tsosie III	Best Supporting Actor	Mile Post 398	Won
