= Monument Valley Film Festival =

Annual film festival in Arizona

- Locations: Kayenta, Arizona, United States
- Years active: 2007–2009
- Founders: Shonie De La Rosa; Andee De La Rosa
- Website: http://www.monumentvalleyfilmfest.com

Monument Valley Film, Blues & Arts Festival was an annual film festival held in Kayenta, Arizona. Established in 2007 by filmmakers Shonie and Andee De La Rosa. They are most known prior for their collaborate effort in the groundbreaking documentary film "G" (2004) and the release of their first full-length feature film Mile Post 398 (2007). It was the only film festival of its kind on the Navajo Nation currently to date.

== See also ==
- "G"
- Mile Post 398
- Native American films
