= Mile Post 398 =

- Directed by: Shonie De La Rosa; Andee De La Rosa
- Written by: Shonie De La Rosa; Andee De La Rosa
- Produced by: Shonie De La Rosa; Andee De La Rosa
- Starring: Beau Benally; Ernest "Ernie" David Tsosie III; Gerald Vandever; James Junes; Kim White; KJ White; Dwayne Lake
- Cinematography: Shonie De La Rosa
- Edited by: Shonie De La Rosa
- Music by: Aaron White; Yaiva; Coalition; Ethnic De Generation
- Distributed by: Sheephead Films
- Release date: January 6, 2007
- Running time: 110 minutes
- Country: United States
- Languages: English; Navajo

Mile Post 398 is a 2007 independent drama film written, directed, and produced by Shonie and Andee De La Rosa, it is also the first featured film in cinema history that was written, produced, directed, filmed and starred in by an all-Navajo team.

It was filmed in Kayenta, Arizona, as well as surrounding locations, Black Mesa, Chinle, Many Farms and Tsegi. It was an official selection of the American Indian Film Festival and Monument Valley Film Festival.

== Plot ==
Taking place on the Navajo Nation, Cloyd Begay (Beau Benally), has been a victim of alcohol abuse and domestic violence throughout his childhood as a result of his resorting to alcohol to repress his memories. As he is willing to take responsibility for his life as a husband and father, Cloyd's drinking buddies Jimmy (Gerald Vandever) and Marty (James Junes) cultivate his continued participation in their carefree lifestyle of drinking and partying, thus preventing him from making significant changes. All the while, his wife Lorraine (Kim White) and son Michael (KJ White) begin to lose hope in him and seriously consider leaving him. As the ensuing events unfold, it leads him to make a life-changing choice.

== Cast ==
Actor	Role
Beau Benally	Cloyd Begay
Gerald Vandever	Jimmy, one of Cloyd's drinking buddies
James Junes	Marty, one of Cloyd's drinking buddies
Ernest "Ernie" David Tsosie III	Ray Yazzie, Cloyd's friend
Kim White	Lorraine Begay, Cloyd's wife
KJ White	Michael Begay, Cloyd's son
Dwayne Lake	Steven, Cloyd's boss
Anthony "Horse" Yellowhorse	Horse, Bootlegger

== Awards ==
Year	Award	Winner/Nominee	Category	Result
2007	American Indian Film Festival	Ernest "Ernie" David Tsosie III	Best Supporting Actor	Won
2007	Fargo Film Festival	Shonie and Andee de la Rosa	Native American Voices/Best Narrative Feature	Won
2007	Tulalip Film Festival	Shonie and Andee de la Rosa	Best Drama	Won
2007	Tulalip Film Festival	Shonie and Andee de la Rosa	Best Screenplay	Won
2008	Talking Stick Film Festival	Beau Benally	Best Actor	Won

== See also ==
- G, a documentary on methamphetamine use on the Navajo Nation, by the same filmmakers
- James & Ernie, a Navajo comedy duo
