= Tatanka Means =

Native American actor (born 1985)

- Born: Tatanka Wanbli Sapa Xila Sabe Means; February 19, 1985 (age 41); Rapid City, South Dakota, U.S.
- Occupations: Actor; Comedian
- Years active: 2004–present
- Height: 6 ft 2 in (188 cm)
- Spouse: Christine Means
- Children: 1
- Parents: Russell Means (father); Gloria Grant (mother)

Tatanka Wanbli Sapa Xila Sabe Means (born February 19, 1985) is an American actor and comedian, of Oglala Lakota, Omaha, Yankton Dakota, and Diné descent. He is best known for his roles in the film Killers of the Flower Moon and on television in the AMC western series The Son and the CBS series Marshals.

== Acting career ==
Means' first screen role was in 2004 playing lead stunt double in the film Black Cloud, which was shot in the same gym where he had previously trained as a boxer. He has since had major roles in several films and TV series. In the miniseries Into the West (2005) he played the Lakota leader Crazy Horse. In More Than Frybread (2012), he played Buddy Begay, a "hip-hop Navajo fry-bread rock star" who sells fry-bread from a truck on the reservation. A reviewer who described it as the "showiest part" in the film said, "Means .. overdoes it a little ... but that's part of Buddy's personality."

In Tiger Eyes (2012), based on the novel by Judy Blume, he played Wolf Ortiz, a Native American boy who shows the main character his ancestral lands and introduces her to his culture. Critics have applauded Means' casting and performance in Tiger Eyes. One described him as "quietly affecting"; another said that he "could have come off as a holy-native cliche, but instead seems entirely real"; and another wrote that he was "superbly cast ... [with] a voice that can quickly disarm and charm a newcomer ... it's clear that we're seeing something almost never seen in a contemporary feature film, which is an utterly authentic representation of a New Mexican." Another review said he is "New Mexican down to his body language and the expression in his eyes .. a thrill to behold on screen."

Other major roles include Hobbamock, an elite Pokanoket warrior, in Saints & Strangers (2015), Delvin in Neither Wolf Nor Dog (2016), and Charges the Enemy in The Son. Means has also appeared in The Burrowers (2008) as 'Tall Ute', Sedona (2011) as Chuck, The Host (2013), Banshee (2014) as 'Hoyt Rivers', A Million Ways to Die in the West (2014), The Night Shift (2014-2015), Maze Runner: The Scorch Trials (2015), and Graves (2016).

In 2019, he appears in Once Upon a River as Bernard Crane, in Montford: The Chickasaw Rancher as Rising Wolf, and in The Dust Monologues as The Jackrabbit. Also in 2019, he was cast in a film version of Alex Kershaw's book The Liberator as Private Thomas Otaktay, a Lakota soldier fighting with the 157th Field Artillery Regiment during World War II.

Means takes pride in portraying Native men as modern, complex people rather than the stereotypical characters sometimes found in Hollywood films.

== Acting awards ==
For his role as Wolf in Tiger Eyes, Means received the award of Best Supporting Actor in the American Indian Film Festival, Best Actor in a Motion Picture at the Red Nation Film Festival, and Tamalewood Award at the Santa Fe Independent Film Festival. He has also won Best Actor at the Nevada Film Festival for his role as Jim Sundell in Derby Kings (2012) and Best Male Actor at the Dreamspeakers Film Festival, Edmonton, Alberta, for the same film.

== Comedy career ==
As a comedian, Means performs with the group 49 Laughs Comedy. Other members include Pax Harvey, James Junes, Ernie Tsosie ii, and Adrianne Chalepah. His standup routines have strong ties back to his Native heritage. In one popular standup, he discusses how Native people tease each other ruthlessly and always solve any awkwardness with the phrase “Aaaayyyyeeee". In another, as he tries to explain email, his grandfather is horrified that he would throw spam into the trash.

== Entrepreneur ==
Means was awarded the American Indian Business Leaders (AIBL) Entrepreneur of the year award in 2011. He created an original clothing line called “Tatanka Clothing”, which is intended to create cultural awareness for Native people and Native business people. In 2006, he appeared in a 21st Century Skins Native American Men's Calendar, which he also helped market.

== Personal life ==
Tatanka Means is one of ten children of activist Russell Means (Oglala Lakota) and his wife. His father as a young man was one of the influential leaders of the American Indian Movement in 1970 and later, which conducted large protests to raise awareness and educate mainstream Americans about Native American issues, civil rights issues, and demand for enforcement of treaties and gains in sovereignty by federally recognized tribes.

The elder Means later performed as an actor. Russell Means appeared in "The Last of the Mohicans" and Tiger Eyes, playing the terminally ill screen father of Tatanka's character. He died soon after filming ended. Tatanka Means carried his father's urn during the funeral.

Means' full Lakota name, Tatanka Wanbli Sapa Xila Sabe, means Black Buffalo Eagle.

Originally growing up with his mother in Chinle, Arizona, on the Navajo Nation, Means now lives with his own family in New Mexico. His wife Christine Means is a yoga instructor. The couple has one daughter. Means is an advocate for sobriety and not using alcohol or drugs.

== Filmography ==
=== Film ===
Year	Title	Role	Notes
2008	The Burrowers	Tall Ute	
2008	Turok: Son of Stone	Bridge Sentry	Voice, direct-to-video
2011	More Than Frybread	Buddy Begay	
2011	Sedona	Chuck	
2012	Tiger Eyes	Wolf	
2013	The Host	Seeker Hawke	
2014	A Million Ways to Die in the West	Other Apache	
2015	Hybrids	Lance Hatton	
2015	Maze Runner: The Scorch Trials	Joe	
2015	Burning Bodhi	Lucas	
2016	Neither Wolf Nor Dog	Delvin	
2016	Shangri-La Suite	Officer Gingrass	
2023	Surrounded	Scar	
2023	Killers of the Flower Moon	John Wren	
2024	Horizon: An American Saga – Chapter 1	Taklishim	
2024	Horizon: An American Saga – Chapter 2	Taklishim	
2025	Opus	Najee	
TBA	Wind River: The Next Chapter		Post-production
TBA	As Deep as the Grave	Seechi	Post-production

=== Television ===
Year	Title	Role	Notes
2005	Into the West	Crazy Horse	Miniseries, 2 episodes
2008	Comanche Moon	Slipping Weasel	Miniseries, 2 episodes
2009	We Shall Remain	Nookau	Episode: "After the Mayflower"
2010	In Plain Sight	Young Fighter	Episode: "Whistle Stop"
2010	Scoundrels	Oscar Altsoba	Episode: "Mary, Mary, Quite Contrary"
2014	Banshee	Hoyt Rivers	4 episodes
2014	Killer Women	Police Officer Stan	Episode: "Demons"
2014–2015	The Night Shift	Paramedic Gonzalez	4 episodes
2015	Saints & Strangers	Hobbamock	Miniseries, 2 episodes
2016	Graves	Russell Pratt	Episode: "The Careless Giant"
2017	The Son	Charges the Enemy	Recurring role, 6 episodes
2020	FBI: Most Wanted	Cody Sampson	Episode: "Ghosts"
2020	I Know This Much Is True	Nabby Drinkwater	Miniseries, 2 episodes
2020	The Liberator	Private Otaktay	Miniseries, 2 episodes
2022	Reservation Dogs	Sam	Episode: "Wide Net"
2024	Ark: The Animated Series	Mato	Voice; Episode: "Element 3"
2024	Outer Range	Officer Edgar	Episode: "All the World's a Stage"
2026	Marshals	Miles Kittle	Main role

=== Video games ===
Year	Title	Role	Notes
2018	Red Dead Redemption 2	Skinners	Voice
