= Vincent Craig =

Native American cartoonist, comedian, and singer/songwriter

- Born: June 6, 1950; Crownpoint, New Mexico
- Died: May 15, 2010 (aged 59); Scottsdale, Arizona
- Burial place: Whiteriver, Arizona
- Citizenship: Navajo Nation and U.S.
- Education: University of New Mexico School of Law, Brigham Young University
- Occupations: tribal probation officer, comic artist, musician, comedian
- Employer(s): Navajo Nation, The Native Times
- Notable work: Muttonman comics, Rita song
- Style: country and Western
- Spouse: Mariddie J. Craig
- Children: 3 sons, including Dustinn Craig, and 1 daughter
- Father: Bob E. Craig

Vincent Craig (June 6, 1950 – May 15, 2010) was a Native American cartoonist, comedian, and singer/songwriter. Craig is known for his comic strip Muttonman and his satirical music about Navajo culture and experience.

== Early life and education ==
Vincent Craig was born on June 6, 1950, in Crownpoint, New Mexico, the son of Robert Etcitty Craig and Nancy Mariano. Craig was a Navajo tribal member. His father, Bob E. Craig, was a Navajo Code Talker who fought at Iwo Jima, and his mother was a cook at the Bureau of Indian Affairs boarding school near Fort Wingate. Craig grew up around Church Rock, New Mexico, one of eight children in his family. In his early education, he was sent to the Wingate Boarding School along with his brother Harrison. From sixth grade through high school, Craig lived with a Mormon foster family in Wayne County, Utah, as part of a Mormon Placement Program known as the Lamanite Placement Program. After high school, Craig enlisted with the United States Marine Corps. Craig began his undergraduate studies at Brigham Young University and then transferred to Arizona State University, where he earned his undergraduate degree.

Craig met his wife Mariddie J. Craig (White Mountain Apache), while he was stationed in Hawaii. They married, adopted a daughter, and had three sons, one being Dustinn Craig (Diné/White Mountain Apache), a filmmaker and skateboarder.

Craig suffered from alcoholism after his return from the Marines and continued to battle with this addiction throughout his life.

== Military and police duty ==
Craig served in the U.S. Marine Corps, where he was stationed in Hawaii for non-combat duty. After his military service, Craig started training for the White Mountain Apache police force in 1974 and joined the force in 1975.

In the mid-1980s, Craig attended the University of New Mexico School of Law. He did not finish his law degree. Instead, he returned to work for the White Mountain Apache Tribe and later, in 1990, worked for the Navajo Nation. He became the Navajo Nation's chief probation officer in 1994.

== Comics ==
In 1977, Craig created one of his first cartoon strips for the Ft. Apache Scout called "Frybread and Beans" about two characters Joe Frybread and Billy Beans.

As a student at BYU, Craig created the cartoon "Benny Yazzie, Undergraduate" for the Native American student newspaper. The cartoon attracted the attention of the editor of The Navajo Times, who asked Craig to create a cartoon strip for the tribal-owned newspaper. This led to the creation of his well-known Navajo superhero Muttonman.

=== Muttonman ===
Craig created the supero-hero character, Muttonman, at the request of the editor of the The Navajo Times, who saw Craig's cartoons for the BYU student newspaper. The weekly super hero comic-strip premiered in 1979 in The Navajo Times and ran for several years until Craig suspended it. The comic strip reappeared in Navajo Nation Today in 1990 until its closure, and eventually returned to The Navajo Times.

LA Times writer Michael Haederle described Muttonman as:

"a goofy masked crusader with an overbite who wears an old Jim Thorpe-style football helmet, a silver concho belt and a Navajo rug for a cape. He’s gained his super powers by eating mutton from sheep that have watered at the Rio Puerco, a New Mexico river contaminated by a uranium tailings spill in the 1970s."

Muttonman's radioactivity and super powers is a result of the contamination of the Rio Puerco during the Churchrock Mine Spill.

== Music ==
As a singer/songwriter, Craig was known for his satirical music about Navajo culture and experience. He performed his music throughout California, Alaska, Washington D.C., and the Navajo Nation. In the 1980s, Craig produced and sold cassettes at the Navajo Nation Fair and other tribal fairs. He was invited to the 11th annual Cowboy Poetry Gathering in Elko, Nevada. One of his popular songs, which played on the local reservation radio XYZ was titled "Rita". Craig's last public appearance was on February 6, 2010, at the Tohono O'odham Tribal Fair.

== Discography ==
- Vincent Craig (cassette, 1986)
- Boarding School Fish Stories (cassette, 1988)
- Navajo Singer Songwriter (cassette, 1989)
- Cowboyz N' Stuff Vol. 4 (cassette, 1997)

== Death ==
Craig died of gastrointestinal stromal tumor cancer in Scottsdale, Arizona, on May 15, 2010.

== Filmography ==
- Turquoise Rose (2007) as Uncle Billy
- Blue Gap Boy'z (2008) as Jessie Nez
