= Raptor Ranch =

- Movie poster
- Directed by: Dan Bishop, Will Raee (2nd Unit)
- Written by: Dan Bishop; Shlomo May-Zur
- Produced by: Stephan Galfas; Mosh Moe Grunberg; Shlomo May-Zur
- Starring: Jana Mashonee; Lorenzo Lamas; Cody Vaughn; Lexy Hulme; Donny Boaz; Cole Brown; Marcus M. Mauldin; Rowdy Arroyo; Kimberly Matula; Declan Joyce; Jack Gould; Carrie Newell; Inges Brigman; Al Burke
- Cinematography: Clint Childers
- Edited by: Dory Lubliner; Christopher Roth; Ryan Williams
- Music by: Evan Frankfort
- Production company: Nu Imagination
- Release date: December 30, 2012 (U.S.)
- Running time: 90 minutes
- Country: United States
- Language: English
- Budget: $3,500,000 (estimated)

Raptor Ranch (also known as The Dinosaur Experiment) is a 2012 science fiction horror comedy film written and directed by Dan Bishop. Produced by Stephan Galfas, Mosh Moe Grunberg and Shlomo May-Zur, it stars Jana Mashonee and Lorenzo Lamas.

== Plot ==
A modern-day Texas community is overrun by vicious prehistoric raptors and a group of people try to survive the raptor onslaught at a cattle ranch.

In Fossil Ridge, Texas, a reclusive, Dr. Cane experimenting with bird DNA, managed to create several species of carnivorous dinosaurs. One of them gets loose and causes a string of killings, drawing the attention of the police and the FBI who send two agents to investigate.

Abbi Whitecloud, a waitress and aspiring singer whose mother was one of the casualties, is forced to work for her demanding boss, Eddie Wayne to pay off a debt. Entering Fossil Ridge are college buddies Sheldon, Lucas, and "Manbeast", who run out of gas, and touring band Little Willie and the Willettes, who suffer engine trouble. Abbi agrees to take Sheldon and Manbeast to the rancher's property for gasoline. They are accompanied by Willie's drummer, Kolin. The rancher suffers a heart attack and Manbeast is devoured after accidentally releasing the rest of the dinosaurs.

Abbi, Sheldon, and Kolin return to Abbi's house to find her boss there, who is subsequently eaten by a T. rex. It then trashes Abbi's house while going after her and her friends. As they escape, they are chased by a pair of Megalosaurs, but Abbi is able to fend them off with a bow and arrows. They return to the gas station to find Lucas as the only survivor; Willie and Willie's band member, Josie has been killed by raptors. After attempting to escape in Willie's broken down tour bus, they are trapped by the dinosaurs and hide in a store. Kolin finds a book containing the dinosaurs' origins. Lucas is eaten by the T. rex in an attempt to fight it. A few hours later, the others escape the store and make it to a factory while the dinosaurs converge and fight one another, with the Megalosaurus emerging victorious.

The Megalosaurus tracks them to a processing plant and in the ensuing chase, Kolin and Sheldon are crushed to death by the rampaging reptile. Abbi lures the dinosaur to a different part of the factory containing flammables, pours gasoline onto the floor and ignites it, incinerating the beast. She is then taken into custody by the FBI agents, who release her and cover up the incident by attributing it to attacks by "killer emus" or "the chupacabra".

One year later, Abbi finally realizes her dream as a cabaret singer and is performing in an undisclosed nightclub. As her show wraps up, a surviving raptor appears and pounces at the screen.

== Cast ==
- Jana Mashonee as Abbi Whitecloud
- Lorenzo Lamas as FBI Special Agent Logan
- Cole Brown as Billy Wayne
- Donny Boaz as Lucas Young
- Cody Vaughan as Sheldon Macabeach
- Lexy Hulme as Kolin
- Kimberly Matula as Josie Hutchens
- Rowdy Arroyo as Man Beast
- Marcus M. Mauldin as Wllie "Little Willie"
- Declan Joyce as FBI Special Agent O'Reilly
- Carrie Newell as Deputy Jones
- Jack Gould as Dr. Cane
- Ines Brigman as FBI Agent Atwood
- Tooraj Ban as FBI Agent Niro
- Billy Sawilchik as FBI Agent Logan
- Al Burke as Sheriff Morgan
- Kyle Little as Eddie Wayne
- Charlene Gleeson as Carrie Ann
- Dan Bishop as Professor (Danny Bishop)
- David Bowman as Man With Shotgun

== Production ==
=== Filming ===
Filmed on location in St. Petersburg, Russia, Leonard and Celeste, Texas, and in Los Angeles, California.

== See also ==
- List of films featuring dinosaurs
