= Sten Joddi =

- Born: Oklahoma, U.S.
- Origin: Mvskoke Nation
- Genre: Hip hop
- Occupations: Rapper, actor

Sten Joddi is a Mvskoke actor and rapper best known for his role on the 2021 TV show Reservation Dogs in which Joddi performs his cult classic, "Greasy Frybread".
