= The Fry Bread House =

Restaurant in Phoenix, Arizona

Coordinates: 33.494613°N 112.060628°W

- Interactive map of The Fry Bread House

Restaurant information
- Established: 1992
- Location: Phoenix, Arizona, United States

The Fry Bread House is a restaurant in Phoenix, Arizona, serving fry bread, a Native American dish of dough fried in lard, Crisco, or oil, which the restaurant serves with various toppings or fillings. Exact recipes and ingredients vary but those typical of frybread are flour, salt, and lard, reflecting the commodities doled out on the reservations by the U.S. federal government.

The Fry Bread House was opened in 1992 by Cecilia Miller, a member of the Tohono O'odham Nation of Native Americans. In 2012, it was recognized by the James Beard Foundation as an American Classic. As of 2012 it was one of only five restaurants, and the first Native American restaurant, in the United States to win the James Beard American Classics award. Miller died in 2020 at age 81 and passed the restaurant to her children.
