= We Shall Remain =

2009 American documentary series

- Written by: Dustinn Craig; Sarah Colt; Ric Burns; Mark Zwonitzer
- Directed by: Chris Eyre; Ric Burns; Stanley Nelson Jr. Dustinn Craig; Sarah Colt
- Narrated by: Benjamin Bratt
- Theme music composer: John Kusiak
- Country of origin: United States
- Original language: English
- No. of episodes: 5

Production
- Running time: 90 minutes (eps. 1, 5); 60 minutes (eps. 2, 3, 4)

Original release
- Network: PBS
- Release: April 13 – May 11, 2009

We Shall Remain (2009) is a five-part, 6-hour documentary series about the history of Native Americans in the United States, from the 17th century into the 20th century. It was a collaborative effort with several different directors, writers and producers working on each episode, including directors Chris Eyre, Ric Burns and Stanley Nelson Jr. Actor Benjamin Bratt narrated the entire series. It is part of the PBS American Experience series and premiered on April 13, 2009.

== Episode list ==
No.	Title	Directed by	Original air date
1	"After the Mayflower"	Chris Eyre	April 13, 2009
In 1621, Wampanoag leader Massasoit negotiates to provide help to the ailing Pilgrims from the Mayflower, who are on the brink of disaster, because he thinks this alliance will ensure protection for his tribe from the threatening Narragansett tribe. For the next fifty years, events prove that Massasoit was wrong, as continuing European immigration, deaths from widespread new diseases, and overuse of natural resources push the interaction between the Wampanoag and the Pilgrims to war led by Metacomet, Massasoit's son.
2	"Tecumseh's Vision"	Ric Burns & Chris Eyre	April 20, 2009
In 1805, Indians in the Northwest Territory were feeling the threat of westward expansion by European-American pioneers. Tecumseh, a Shawnee, brought regional tribes together into a confederacy with the common goal of saving their ancestral lands and establishing a separate Indian nation state. Tecumseh was killed in battle in 1813.
3	"Trail of Tears"	Chris Eyre	April 27, 2009
In years of trading with European Americans, many Cherokee members also adopted aspects of European-American religion, government, and education to establish their standing with the United States government and retain recognition of their rights to their homeland as a sovereign nation. But President Andrew Jackson gained passage of the Indian Removal Act in 1830 and proceeded to remove especially the Southeastern Five Civilized Tribes. On May 26, 1838, U.S. troops forcibly began to remove the Cherokee and their enslaved African Americans from their land to Indian Territory (now Oklahoma) west of the Mississippi River. More than 4,000 people died of disease and starvation along the Trail of Tears.
4	"Geronimo"	Dustinn Craig	May 4, 2009
Apache Geronimo and his fierce band of warriors refused to accept the expansion of the United States and Mexican into his tribe's land on the Plains. They earned the distinction of being one of the last major forces of Native American resistance before their eventual surrender in 1886. Geronimo became the most famous Native American of his time.
5	"Wounded Knee"	Stanley Nelson	May 11, 2009
At a time of increasing Indian activism, the American Indian Movement's last stand at Wounded Knee in 1973 brought attention to the desperate conditions of Indian reservation life. Around 200 American Indians engaged in a 71-day standoff at the Pine Ridge Reservation with the US government, demanding redress for grievances, some of which were of 100 years' standing.

== Reception ==
We Shall Remain received positive reviews. Ginia Bellafante from The New York Times described the episode "Tecumseh's Vision" as "particularly illuminating", but criticized historical reenactments in early episodes. Robert Lloyd from the Los Angeles Times also praised the show as ambitious and "largely gratifying". A review in the American History magazine praised the narration and cinematography in the show.
