= Ernest Tsosie =

Diné actor and comedian from Arizona (born 1967)

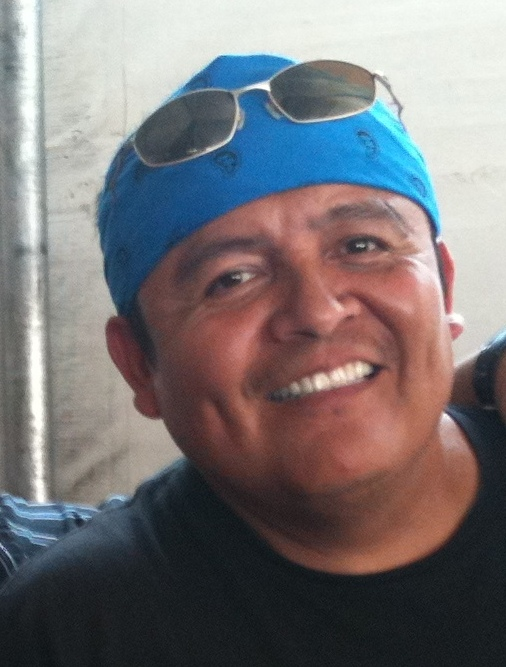
- Ernest Tsosie in 2012
- Born: Ernest David Tsosie III; 1967 (age 58–59); Fort Defiance, Arizona, U.S.
- Citizenship: Navajo Nation and U.S.

Comedy career
- Medium: Stand-up comedy, radio, film, television
- Genre: Observational comedy
- Subjects: Reservation life, everyday life, current events, satire

Ernest David Tsosie III (born 1967), also known as "Ernie Tsosie", is a Diné (Navajo) actor and comedian. He is of the To'ahani, Todich'ii'nii, Tabaaha and Tachii'nii clans. Tsosie's hometown is Window Rock, Arizona.

== Early life and education ==
Tsosie attended Window Rock high school and later became a graduate of Gallup high school.

== Career ==
In 2002, Tsosie began working with fellow comedian James Junes, to form the comedy team James & Ernie. He has gone on to appear in Longmire, Better Call Saul as well as the Dark Winds television series based on the novels of Tony Hillerman. He played the role of Benny Begay in the Netflix series, Rez Ball. He starred in the movie Drunktown's Finest, in the first feature film made by Sydney Freeland.

Tsosie has also served as a motivational speaker at many schools from elementary through high school to promote an alcohol, drug, and commercial tobacco free lifestyle.

== Personal life ==
Tsosie is the son of Ernest Tsosie, Jr. and the brother of John L. Tsosie; the two of them founded Walking the Healing Path, Inc, an organization with the mission to "end domestic violence and child abuse/neglect in the many homes and families that make up not only the Navajo Nation but the entire US as a whole" and also Project Peace Train.

Tsosie is married to Miranda Tsosie, and as of 2012, the couple has four children.
