= Stephan Galfas =

American record producer

Stephan Galfas is an American record producer, currently CEO of International Talent Organization, Inc. and Miss Molly Records.

== Biography ==
Galfas is a producer, composer, manager, musician, mixer and recording engineer who has worked with many acts including Cher, The Allman Brothers Band, Meat Loaf, Stryper, Saxon, Dr. Sin, Kool and the Gang, Savatage, Intergalactic Touring Band, China, EZO, Palace, ELO Part II, Pezband, Good Rats and GRAMMY nominee and 9 time Native American Music Award (NAMMY) winner Jana Mashonee. Albums he has worked on have sold over one hundred million copies. He currently resides in Greenwich, Connecticut.

== Awards ==
- Producer of Jana Mashonee a GRAMMY nominee and nine-time winner of the Native American Music Awards (NAMMYS). Also nominated for 2006 GRAMMY for Best Native American Music Album
- 2008 Best Producer: "American Indian Story" by Jana Mashonee (NAMMYS)
- 2007 Best Domestic Music Video: "The Enlightened Time" Queens International Film Festival
- 2006 Best Producer: American Indian Christmas by Jana Mashonee (NAMMYS)
- 2006 Best Pop Recording Native American Music Awards (NAMMYS) "American Indian Story"
- Director, producer and editor of the video for Jana's The Enlightened Time, winner of Best Domestic Music Video at the 2007 Queens International Film Festival
