= Frybread =

Variety of flatbread

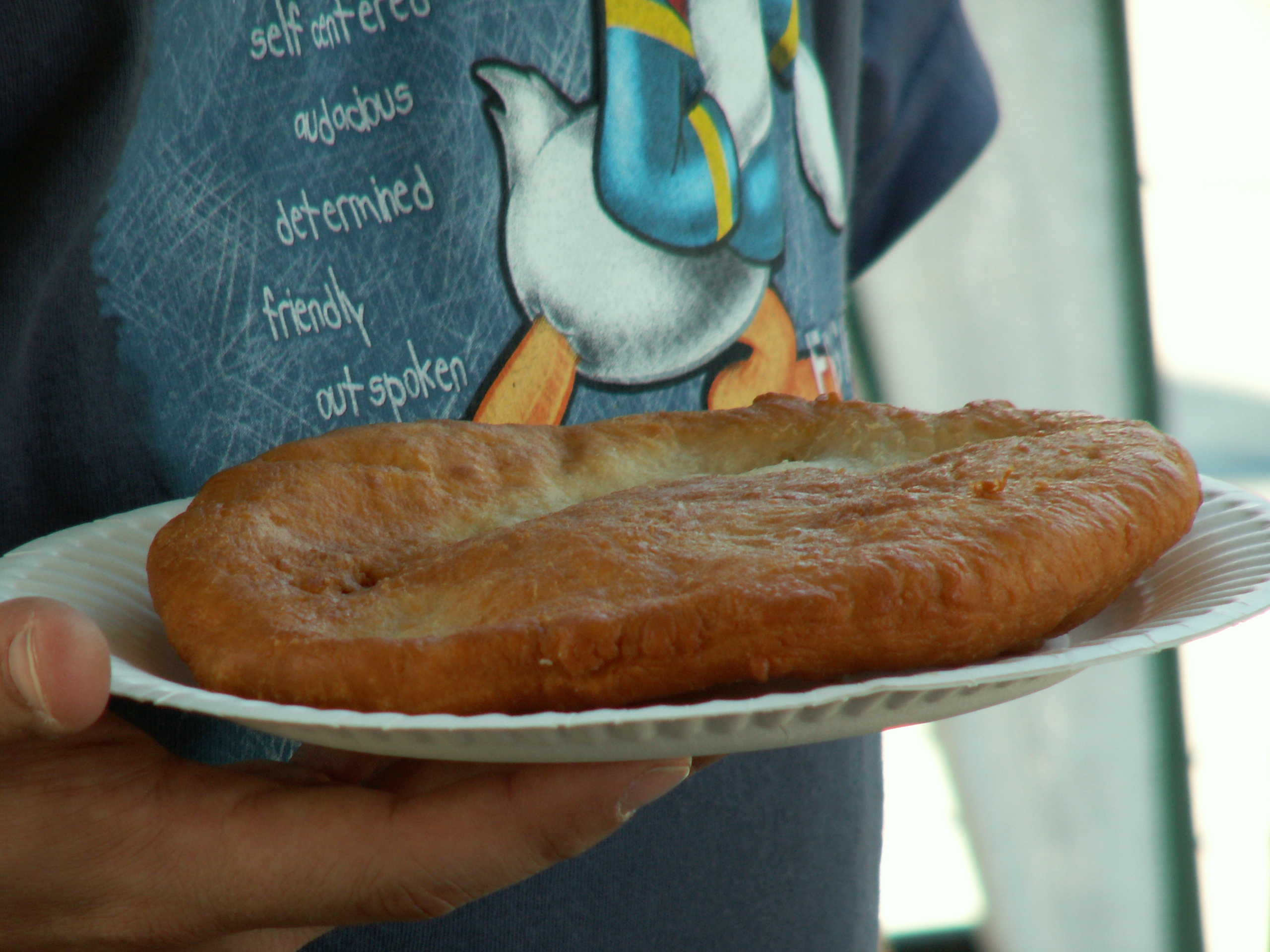
- Type: Flatbread
- Place of origin: North America
- Created by: Native Americans
- Main ingredients: Dough, leavening agent, fat (oil, shortening, or lard)
- Other information: State bread of South Dakota

Frybread (also spelled fry bread) is a dish of the indigenous people of North America that is a flat dough bread, fried or deep-fried in oil, shortening, or lard.

Made with simple ingredients, generally wheat flour, water, salt, and sometimes baking powder, frybread can be eaten alone or with various toppings, such as honey, jam, powdered sugar, venison, or beef. It is the base for Indian tacos.

Frybread has a complex cultural history that is inextricably intertwined with colonialism and displacement of Native Americans. The ingredients for frybread were provided to Native Americans to prevent them from starving when they were moved from areas where they could grow and forage their traditional foods to areas that would not support their traditional foods. Critics see the dish as both a symbol of colonization and a symbol of resilience.

== History ==
Frybread is a staple in the Northern Native American/Indigenous communities to prevent the displaced Tribes from starving. The United States government provided a small set of staple food items, which included the ingredients to create a simple quick bread, that was cooked in a pan of hot lard over coals and became known as frybread. The US government believed that this food was a traditional Native American dish, which is a common misconception. Frybread is considered a food of oppression, cooked up out of necessity. The food eventually spread to other tribes. Boarding schools also helped to spread frybread in Native American diets.

Frybread was named the official state bread of South Dakota in 2005. That same year, activist Suzan Shown Harjo wrote a piece against frybread in Indian Country Today, calling the dish "emblematic of the long trails from home and freedom to confinement and rations...It's the connecting dot between healthy children and obesity, hypertension, diabetes, dialysis, blindness, amputations, and slow death"; critics have accused Harjo of overstating her case and unfairly blaming frybread for problems facing Native Americans. In 2012 the Phoenix restaurant The Fry Bread House was named an American Classic by the James Beard Foundation.

== Culture and symbolism ==
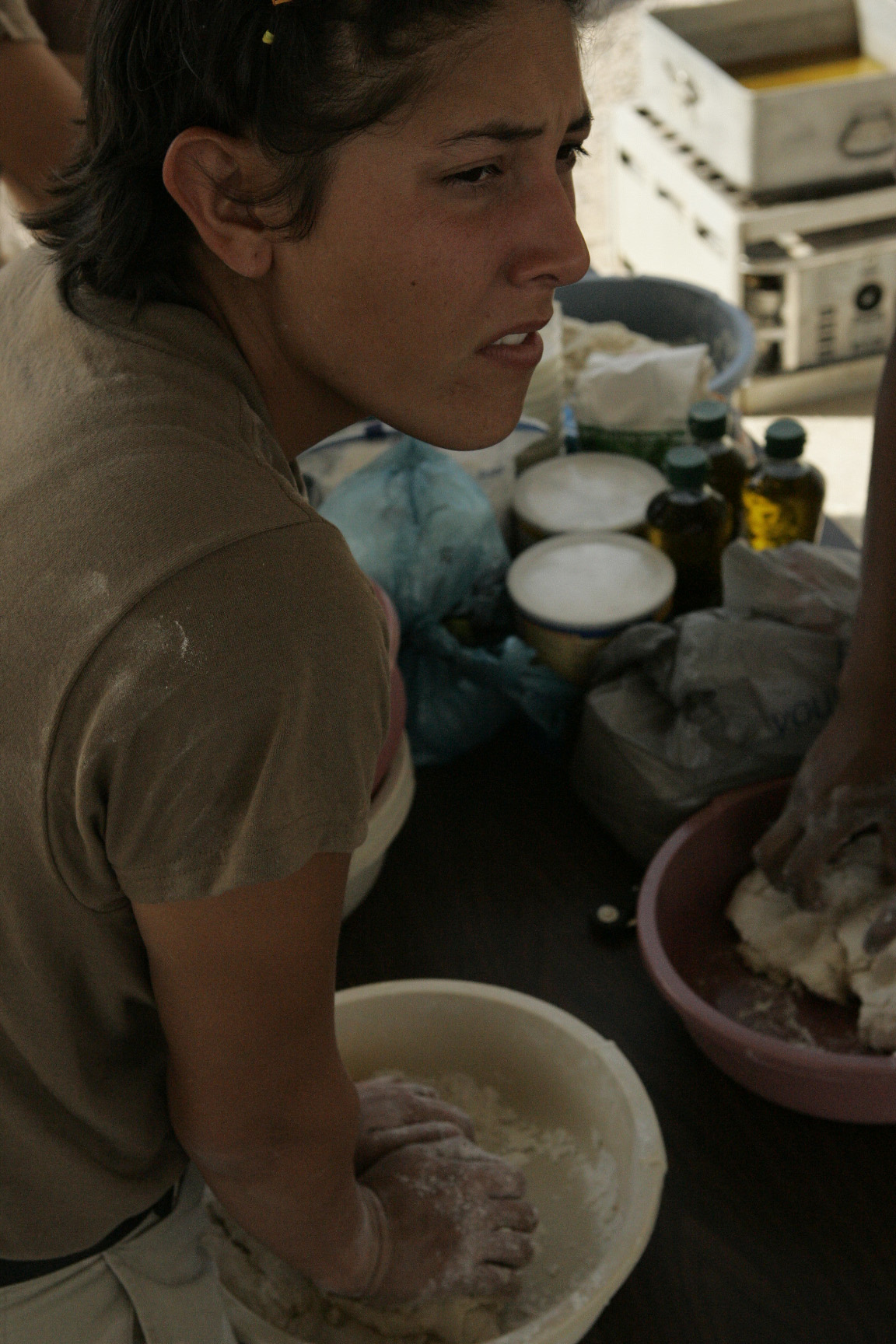
A member of the Creek tribe making frybread (2004)

Frybread became inextricably intertwined with Native American culture and feelings toward colonialization and displacement, and also with pride in the resilience of a people and culture.

According to Smithsonian Magazine, for many Native Americans, "frybread links generation with generation and also connects the present to the painful narrative of Native American history".

Frybread's significance to Native Americans has been described as complicated and their relationship with it conflicted. Although frybread is often associated with "traditional" Native American cuisine, some Native American chefs reject it as a symbol of colonialism. Indigenous chef Sean Sherman calls it "everything that isn't Native American food", writing that it represents "perseverance and pain, ingenuity and resilience". Frybread became a symbol of resilience as it was developed out of necessity using government-provided flour, sugar, and lard. However, indigenous chefs such as Sherman consider it a symbol of colonial oppression, as the ingredients were being provided because the government had moved the people onto land that could not support growing traditional staples like corn and beans.

The journalist and documentary filmmaker Patty Talahongva, who is Hopi of the Corn Clan, calls frybread "Die Bread" and associates it with diseases endemic to Native Americans, including gallbladder disease, diabetes, and more. She attributes the spread of frybread to boarding schools, like the Phoenix Indian School, which she attended in the late 1970s. She also describes the movement toward indigenous food sovereignty, which promotes healthy foods like corn, beans, and squash, instead of starchy, high-fat foods like frybread.

== Preparation and serving ==
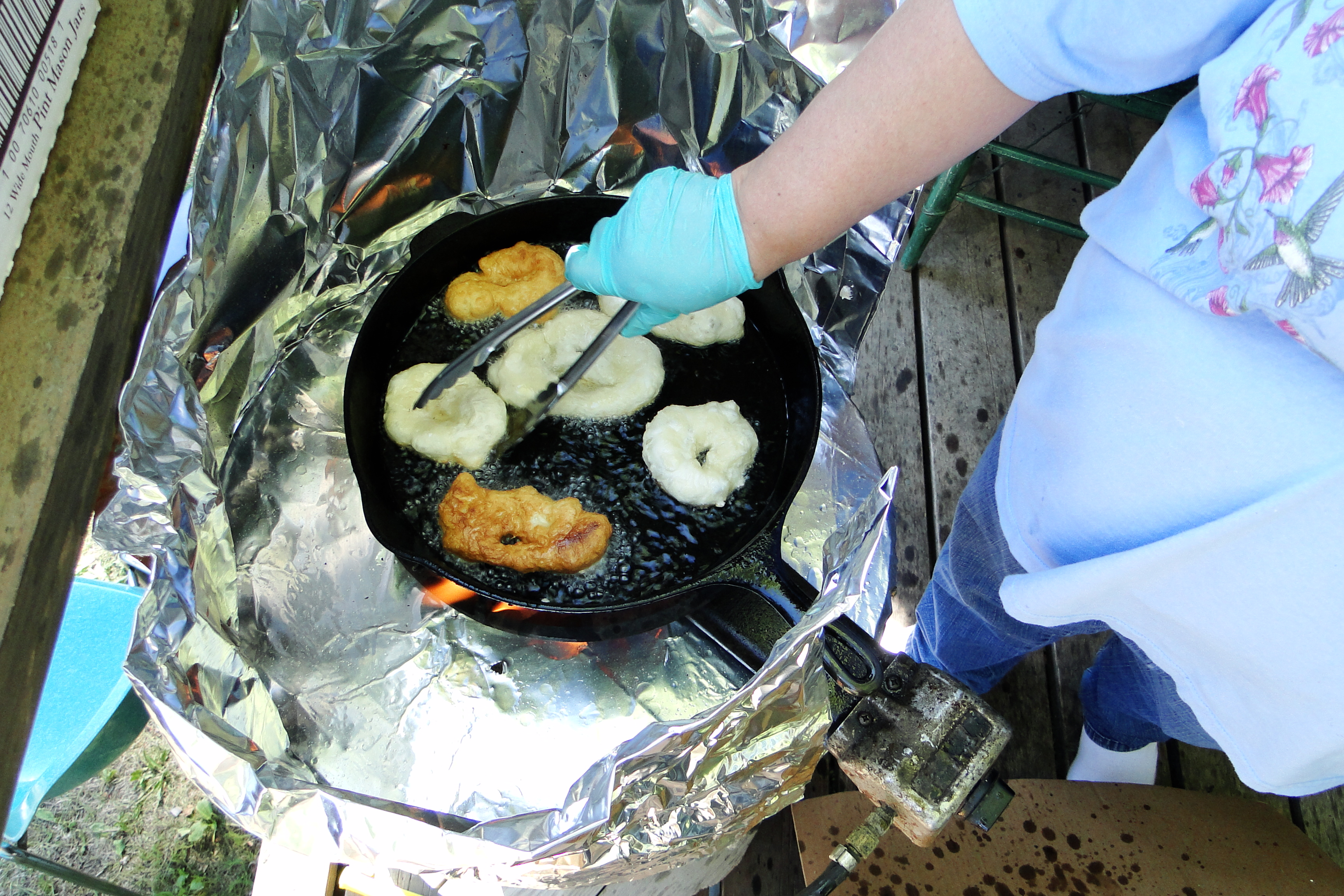
Frybread being cooked in a cast-iron skillet during a funeral potlatch in Tanana, Alaska.

A typical frybread recipe consists of flour, water, salt, a small amount of oil or lard, and sometimes baking powder or more rarely yeast. The ingredients are mixed and worked into a simple dough, and covered with a cloth for 30 minutes to an hour, until the dough rises. It is then formed into small balls, and are either rolled or pulled into flat discs prior to frying in hot oil.

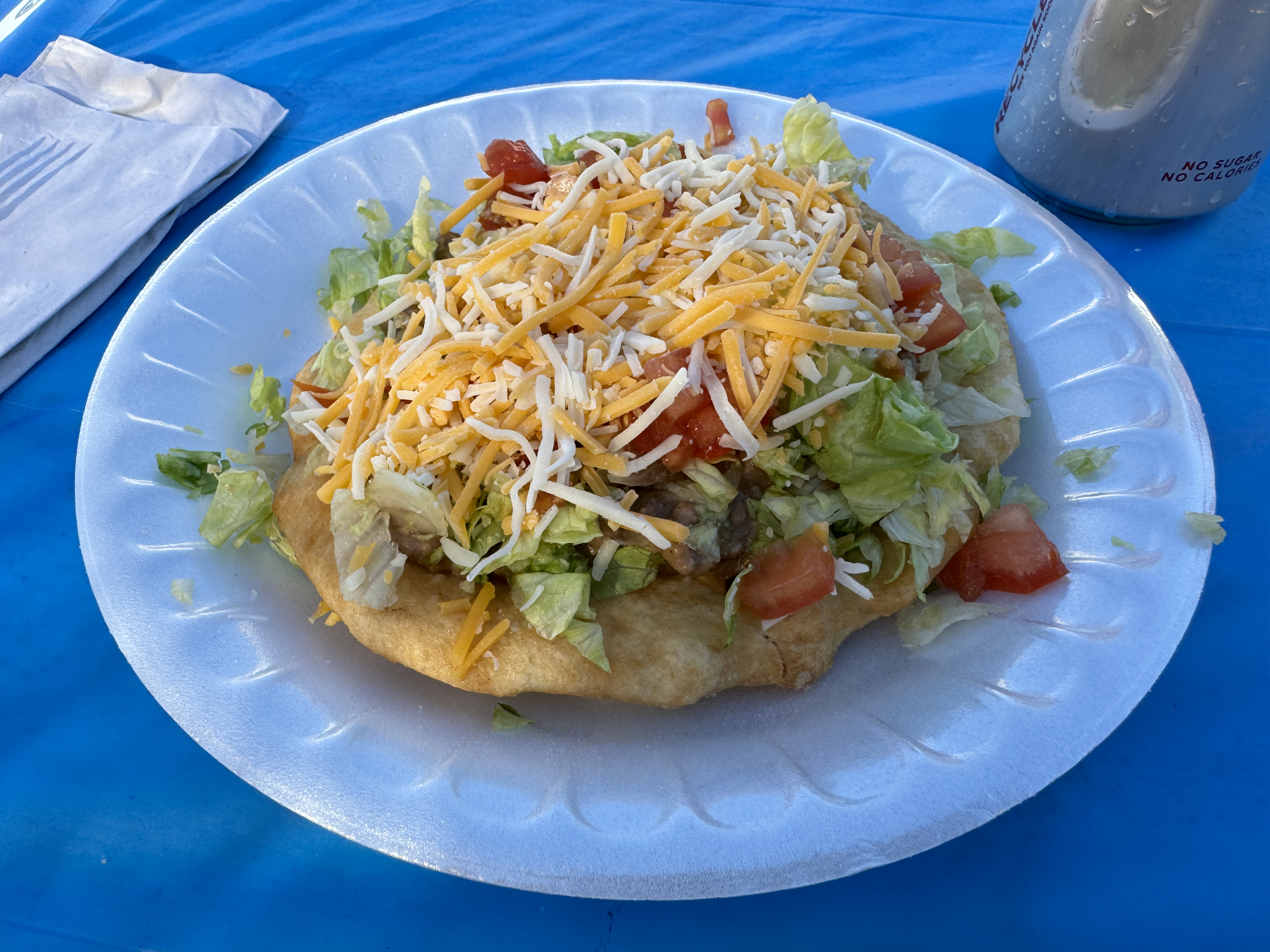
A frybread taco, Indian taco, or Navajo taco, is a frybread topped with various items, normally venison or beef, as well as other toppings commonly found in tacos.

It is served both in homes and at gatherings such as pow-wows and potlatches as well as at state fairs and other festivals. The way it is served varies from region to region and different tribes have different recipes. It can be found in its many ways at state fairs and pow-wows, but what is served to the paying public may be different from what is served in private homes and in the context of tribal family relations.

They may be eaten plain, salted, or with sugar or honey, or as a base for Navajo tacos.

== In popular culture ==
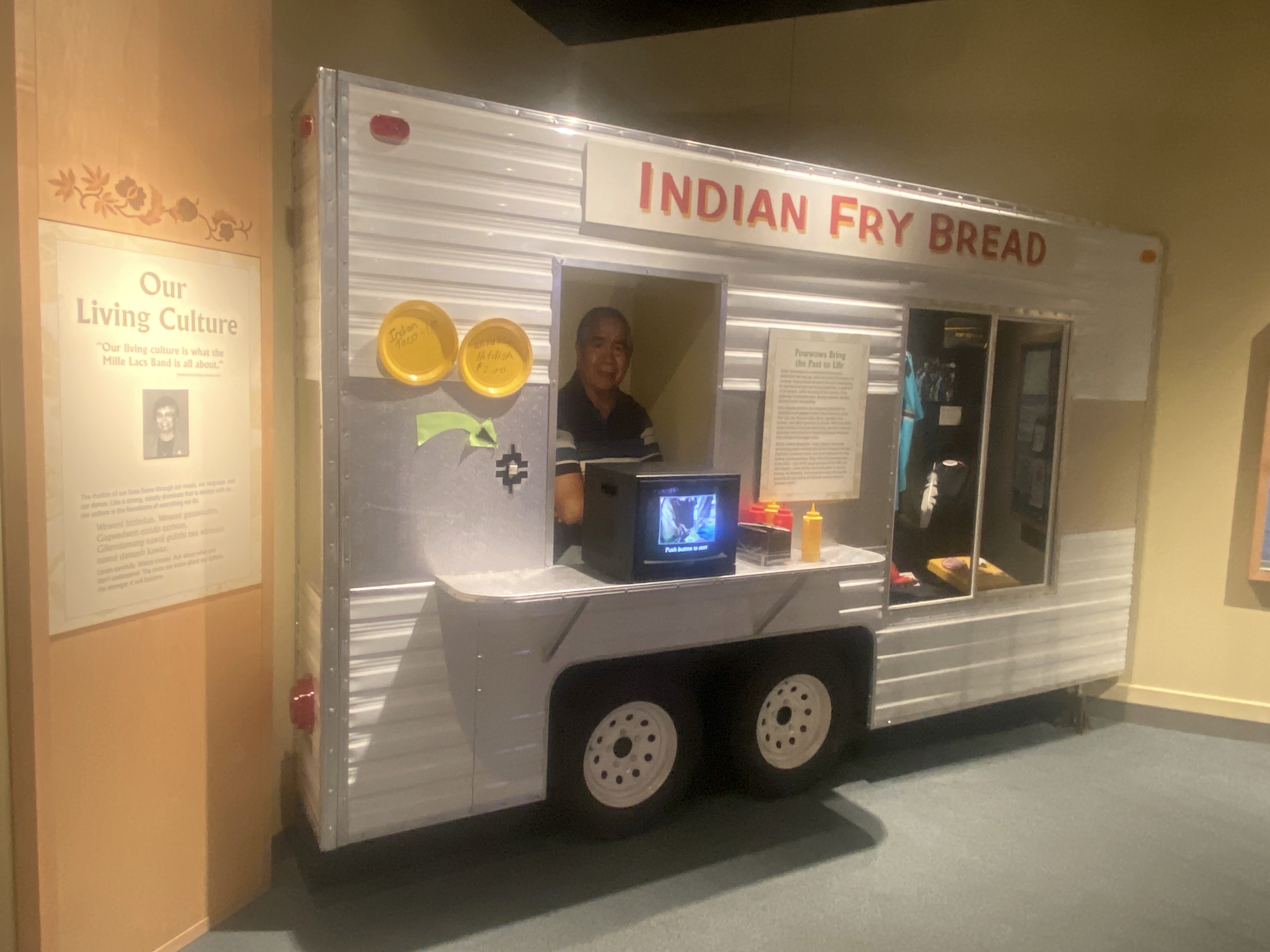
Indian Fry Bread exhibit display at Mille Lacs Indian Museum

- Frybread, and the phrase "Frybread Power", is featured in Sherman Alexie's 1998 film Smoke Signals. Characters are frequently seen eating, frying, or discussing the bread's taste and cultural importance.
- Keith Secola features it in his song Fry Bread.
- A fictional frybread contest formed the plotline for the 2012 mockumentary More Than Frybread.
- Fry Bread: A Native American Family Story is a 2019 picture book by Kevin Noble Maillard and illustrated by Juana Martinez-Neal which in 2020 won the Robert F. Sibert Informational Book Medal and was an honor book in the American Indian Youth Literature Awards.
- A 2021 episode of Reservation Dogs, an Indigenous American television series created by Sterlin Harjo and Taika Waititi for FX Productions, features a character performed by Sten Joddi who is an Indigenous rapper and raps a song called "Greasy Frybread".
- The 2023 film Frybread Face and Me is a Navajo coming-of-age story.

== Similar foods ==
- Bannock of the First Nations of Canada shares a similar cultural history with frybread.
- Modern Lángos from Hungary is similar to frybread.
- In Russia a fried flatbread made from yeast dough is called pryazhenik (Russian: пряженик).
- The Māori people of New Zealand also have a frybread called parāoa parai.
- Bhature are a type of deep-fried sourdough bread from North India, associated with Punjabi cuisine.
- Mangalore buns are a type of deep-fried bread from India, traditionally prepared using ripe bananas as a key ingredient.
- Romani people have a similar frybread called pufa or manriklo.
- In South Africa frybread is called Vetkoek.

== See also ==
- Fried dough
- List of bread dishes
- List of fried dough foods
- List of quick breads
- Indigenous cuisine of the Americas
