= Blue Gap Boy'z =

- Theatrical release poster
- Directed by: Holt Hamilton
- Written by: Holt Hamilton
- Produced by: Travis Hamilton; Rebekah Hamilton; José Montoya
- Starring: Ernest "Ernie" David Tsosie III; Vincent Craig; James Bilagody; Beau Benally; Sallie Glaner Braden; Horst Aschmann
- Cinematography: Holt Hamilton
- Edited by: Derek Natzke
- Music by: Guilty Wilson; Vincent Craig; Jana; The Plateros
- Distributed by: Better World Distribution
- Release date: November 7, 2008
- Running time: 90 minutes
- Country: United States
- Languages: English; Navajo

Blue Gap Boy'z is a 2008 American independent comedy film written and directed by Holt Hamilton. Blue Gap Boy'z was filmed primarily in Phoenix, Arizona, as well as on the Navajo Nation in Blue Gap, Arizona.

== Cast ==
- Ernest "Ernie" David Tsosie III as James Nez
- Vincent Craig as Jessie Nez
- James Bilagody as Jodie Nez
- Beau Benally as Frankie B.
- Sallie Glaner Braden as Sara
- Horst W. Aschmann as Rolf
- Guilty Wilson as Mystic Love
- Jana Mashonee as herself
- Deshava Apachee as Mr. Big Extra Tough Guy
- Gary M. Helmbold as Mr. Snow

== See also ==
- Turquoise Rose
- Pete & Cleo
- Jana Mashonee, a Lumbee/Tuscarora singer and actress
- James and Ernie, a Navajo comedy duo
