= Jana Mashonee =

American singer

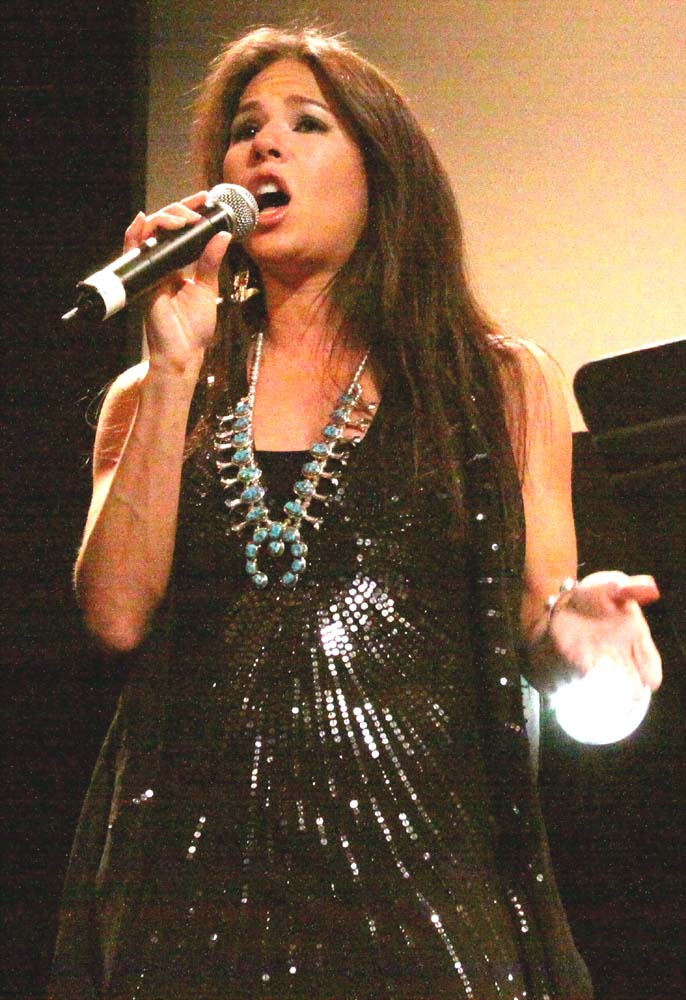
- Jana Mashonee at the Poncan Theatre, 2010

Background information
- Born: Jana Sampson
- Origin: Robeson County, North Carolina, United States
- Genres: Pop, R&B, Electronic
- Occupations: Singer-songwriter, actress, author
- Years active: 2000s–present
- Label: unsigned
- Website: www.janaofficial.com

Jana Mashonee, (born Jana Sampson), better known by her stage name, Jana, is an American singer, songwriter, actress, author and philanthropist. She is originally from Robeson County, North Carolina. Jana is a two-time Grammy nominee and nine-time Nammy winner. Her music is steeped in R&B and gospel roots, which introduced her to the mainstream.

== Early life ==
Jana is from Robeson County, North Carolina; although she grew up in Charlotte, North Carolina. Jana is a member of the Lumbee Tribe of North Carolina. She was first introduced to music by her father (who is a singer and drummer). The surname Mashonee was a native name given to Jana by her family. It is from Lumbee English and means "money belt.

Mashonee graduated from Davidson College in 1996 with a degree in psychology, and shortly after got a record deal. First signed to Curb Records, her single, "Ooh, Baby, Baby," was picked as Billboard’s single of the week and went on to become a radio and sales success. "More Than Life" followed, selling over a million copies on its own and as part of numerous compilation albums. A controversial version of Led Zeppelin’s epic "Stairway to Heaven", came next, earning her the honor of being the first Native American to top the Billboard dance charts.

== Career ==
Exploring her cultural roots, Mashonee released American Indian Story, a concept album that garnered her a second Grammy nomination. The video for the single, "The Enlightened Time", won awards at film festivals around the world as well as a Nammy for Best Short Form Music Video. Music from the album is featured on the Discovery Channel's series, Flying Wild Alaska.

She recently completed her first book, American Indian Story – The Adventures of Sha’kona, based on the Grammy-nominated album of the same name. The fantasy filled mystery-adventure young adult novel features a young heroine, Sha’kona, and her journey of self-discovery and courage.

Mashonee continued to pay tribute to her heritage with American Indian Christmas, featuring ten classic Christmas songs sung in ten different Native American languages, and accompanied by a full orchestra and traditional Native American instruments. A critical and commercial success, the album won her another Nammy award. On December 16, 2011, she featured some of these songs in an emotional and intimate performance at Carnegie Hall in New York.

With New Moon Born, she moved in a new direction, steeped in R&B and gospel roots; this brought her back to mainstream attention. She debuted the featured track, an cover of Sam Cooke's classic, "A Change Is Gonna Come", at the American Indian Inaugural Ball for President Obama. This was her second performance for a First Family. A year earlier she sang at the First Lady's luncheon for Laura Bush. The song won her an eighth Nammy for Song of the Year, and the video took the Best Music Video prizes at both the Indie Film and the American Indian Film festivals.

Mashonee's tour schedule has taken her to forty nine of the fifty states, and overseas.

Mashonee has also performed as an actress. In 2012, she starred in her first movie Raptor Ranch, which debuted at the Israel Film Festival. In 2014, it was released on HD-DVD, Redbox, and to select streaming networks under the name The Dinosaur Experiment.

== Charity ==
Her Jana’s Kids Foundation has been helping Native youth through its programs and scholarship offerings. Mashonee was named 2011 Woman of the Year by "yearofthewoman2011.com" for her philanthropic work. She has also supported charities such as The Golden Hat Foundation for autism, founded by actor Kate Winslet.

Mashonee says about her own foundation, "I've been blessed to be able to travel across the country to many reservations to talk to youth and address issues of cultural identity and education. From this, I've been able to raise enough money to offer scholarships to deserving Native youth in the artistic, academic, and athletic fields..."

She performed with Sarah McLachlan, and Loreena McKennitt among other stars to support this charity cause at Carnegie Hall in December 2012.

== Personal life ==
Referring to herself as an "Urban Indian", Mashonee has said, "From a cultural perspective, I describe myself as an Urban Indian because I am a Native American person who "walks in both worlds" –an expression that refers to Natives who live their lives in the traditional and in the contemporary/modern worlds."

Mashonee grew up in a Baptist church. She is a self-proclaimed Christian, stating she focuses more on exploring spirituality of the Creator than just rules written by men. She currently resides in New York City.

== Discography ==
=== Albums ===
- Flash of a Firefly (2005) Radikal Records Nammy Award Winner
- American Indian Christmas (2005) Standing Stone/SOAR Records Nammy Award Winner
- American Indian Story (2006) Standing Stone/SOAR Records Grammy Award nominated
- New Moon Born (2010) Miss Molly Records Nammy Award Winner

=== Singles ===
- "What Am I to You" b/w "Kind of Love" (1997) – Top 40 on the Radio & Records’ rhythmic chart (Curb records)
- "Near Me" b/w "The Price" (1998) – A cover of a song originally by the artist Sheryl Crow. (Curb Records)
- "Ooh, Baby, Baby" (1999) - A success on radio and in the Radio & Records, DMA, Hitmakers, and Gavin charts. Billboard magazine named "Ooh, Baby, Baby" pop Single of the Week in October. (Curb Records)
- "More Than Life" (2000) – Reached the Top 10 on Billboard's Artists to Watch chart and peaked in Billboard Magazine's Hot Shot Debut At No. 29. Remixes were made by DJ Skribble and Anthony Acid. (Curb Records)
- "Two Out of Three Ain't Bad" (2001) – A cover of a song originally by the artist Meat Loaf. (Curb Records).
- "Stairway to Heaven" (2002) - Peaked at No. 7 on Billboard's Hot Dance Singles Sales chart, and was remixed by DJ Skribble and Dave Gadbois. (Radikal Records)
- "Found a Love" (2003) – (Radikal Records)
- "Do It Mr. DJ" (2004) – (Xtreme Records) (Peter Presta & Jana)
- "I'll Be with You" – (Standing Stone/Radikal Records)
- "A Change Is Gonna Come" – Miss Molly Records/Sony/Red Music
- "Stay with Me Baby" – Miss Molly Records

== Awards and nominations ==
- Merit Award 2009 – The Indie Fest for "A Change Is Gonna Come" video
- Grammy Award nominations
  - Nominated – Best Native American Music Album for American Indian Story.
  - Nominated – Pop/Contemporary Gospel Album. Co-writing on the song "Kiss and Tell" with Crystal Lewis, which appears on Lewis' album Fearless.
- Native American Music Awards (NAMMY's)
    - Best Pop Artist
    - Best Pop/Rock Recording (More Than Life)
    - Song of the Year (Stairway to Heaven)
    - Best Female Artist (Found a Love)
    - Record of the Year – Flash of a Firefly
    - Best Producer (with Alex Salzman) for Jana's American Indian Christmas
    - Best Pop Recording (American Indian Story)
    - Best Short Form Music Video (The Enlightened Time)
    - Best Producer (with Alex Salzman) for Jana's American Indian Christmas
    - Song/Single of the Year "A Change is Gonna Come"
- American Indian Film Festival
    - Best Video "A Change is Gonna Come"
- Queens International Film Festival
    - Winner Best Domestic Music Video (The Enlightened Time)

== Acting career ==
Year	Title	Role	Notes
2008	Blue Gap Boy'z	Singing contestant	Cameo
2013	Raptor Ranch	Abbi Whitecloud	
2021	Fostering Dad	Mom	

== Job as Creative Director ==
From January 2010 till June 2016, Jana Mashonee was also Creative Director on the Activation, Inc. in New York, NY.
