= G (2004 film) =

G: Methamphetamine on the Navajo Nation
- Directed by: Shonie De La Rosa; Larry Blackhorse Lowe
- Produced by: Shonie De La Rosa; Larry Blackhorse Lowe
- Cinematography: Shonie De La Rosa
- Edited by: Shonie De La Rosa
- Distributed by: Sheephead Films; Blackhorse Films
- Release date: 2004
- Running time: 60 minutes
- Country: United States
- Languages: English; Navajo

G: Methamphetamine on the Navajo Nation, known simply as G is a 2004 independent documentary film directed and produced by Shonie De La Rosa and Larry Blackhorse Lowe. It explores the effect that methamphetamine has had on the Navajo Nation and interviews the people whose lives have been affected by the highly addictive drug.

== Award ==
- 2004 – American Indian Film Festival: Best Public Service Award

== See also ==
- Mile Post 398, a drama directed and produced by the same team, with an all-Navajo cast
