= Turquoise Rose =

- Directed by: Holt Hamilton
- Produced by: Holt Hamilton; Jake Johnson; Julius C. Tulley
- Starring: Natasha Kaye Johnson; Deshava Apachee; Ethel Begay; Bria Sherinian; Rhonda Ray; Ernest "Ernie" David Tsosie III; Vincent Craig
- Cinematography: Holt Hamilton
- Edited by: Derek Natzke
- Music by: Casey Dooley; Until August; Stateline; Guilty Wilson
- Distributed by: Holt Hamilton Productions
- Release date: July 29, 2007
- Running time: 94 minutes
- Country: United States
- Languages: English; Navajo
- Budget: $150,000

Turquoise Rose is a 2007 independent drama film co-written and directed by Holt Hamilton that takes place in the Navajo Nation. Turquoise Rose was filmed primarily in the Navajo Nation in Fort Defiance, Arizona, as well as in Phoenix, Arizona. The film is one of the only American films to feature an indigenous Native American lead role for an actress, played by Navajo actress Natasha Kaye Johnson.

== Synopsis ==
Turquoise "T" is in college in Phoenix and struggling at work as a photographer for a newspaper. She reluctantly agrees to stay with her grandmother on the Navajo reservation while she recovers from an illness. Over the summer she bonds deeply with her feisty and traditional grandmother in their rural homeland. Along the way she also gets to know the locals, including beginning a relationship with a handsome young artist named Harry, who has got personal issues of his own. Through many happy and sad memories, she gains a sense of purpose upon returning to the city and uses her skills in photography to make a change in her life, while honoring the experiences with her grandmother, with Harry by her side.

== Cast ==
- Natasha Kaye Johnson as Turquoise "Rose" Roanhorse
- Deshava Apachee as Harry Bahe, Turquoise's love interest
- Ethel Begay as Masani, Turquoise's grandmother
- Rhonda Ray as Lillian Roanhorse, Turquoise's mother
- Bria Sherinian as Michelle, Turquoise's friend
- John Boomer as Sam Johnson
- Ernest "Ernie" David Tsosie III as Alvin Bahe
- Vincent Craig as Uncle Billy, Harry's uncle
- Katie Yazzie as Aunt Mary, Turquoise's aunt

== Premiere ==
The film held its world premiere at Navajo History Museum & Visitor Center located at the Navajo Nation capital Window Rock, Arizona.

== Accolades ==
| Year | Award | Recipients | Category | Result |
|---|---|---|---|---|
| 2007 | American Indian Film Festival | Natasha Kaye Johnson | Best Actress | Nominated |
| 2007 | American Indian Film Festival | Deshava Apachee | Best Supporting Actor | Nominated |

== See also ==
- Blue Gap Boy'z
- Pete & Cleo
- James and Ernie, a Navajo comedy duo
