= Dustinn Craig =

Native American filmmaker and skateboarder from Arizona, U.S.

- Born: 1975 (age 50–51); Mesa, Arizona
- Citizenship: White Mountain Apache Tribe of the Fort Apache Reservation, United States
- Known for: filmmaking, skateboarding
- Parents: Vincent Craig (father); Mariddie J. Craig (mother)
- Website: vimeo.com/betterones

Dustinn Craig is a Native American filmmaker and skateboarder from Arizona. Craig is an enrolled citizen of the White Mountain Apache Tribe of the Fort Apache Reservation and also has Navajo heritage.

== Early life ==
Dustinn Craig was born in Mesa, Arizona, in 1975. His father was the comedian, comic artist, and musician Vincent Craig (Navajo Nation, 1950–2010), whose parents were Nancy Mariano Etsitty and Bob Etsitty Craig, a Navajo code talker. Dustinn's mother was Mariddie J. Craig (White Mountain Apache).

Dustinn grew up on the Fort Apache Indian Reservation in Arizona and later at Window Rock, Arizona, on the Navajo Reservation.

== Skateboarding ==
As of 2020, Craig is leader of the White Mountain skate team. Craig began filmmaking when, as a teenager, he started making skateboard videos.

== Filmmaking ==
Craig's filmmaking career often focuses on topics that explore his identity as a White Mountain Apache person who grew up on Indian reservations.

Craig wrote, directed, and produced I Belong to This, a personal documentary that is part of the 2003 PBS documentary series Matters of Race. In 2005 the National Video Resources Media Artists Fellowship awarded Craig for his documentary on skateboarding at Fort Apache: Ride through Genocide. In 2005, the Heard Museum in Phoenix, Arizona hired Craig to produce and direct three films, two about the Havasupai Tribe and the Colorado River Indian Tribes in Arizona and one entitled “HOME”, a multi-screen half hour documentary that features the imagery of the Native Southwest and first hand perspectives of Native People. Craig is also a recipient of the 2005 Rockefeller Media Arts Fellowship.

In 2008, Craig released a film about Geronimo, the fourth episode in the 5 part documentary series “We Shall Remain” produced by American Experience. The film premiered at the 2008 Native Cinema Showcase. In 2009, Craig released Our Home, Our Stories: Short Films by Dustinn Craig, a compilation broadcast on Arizona Public Television.
