= Mille Lacs Indian Museum and Trading Post =

Native American museum in Minnesota, US

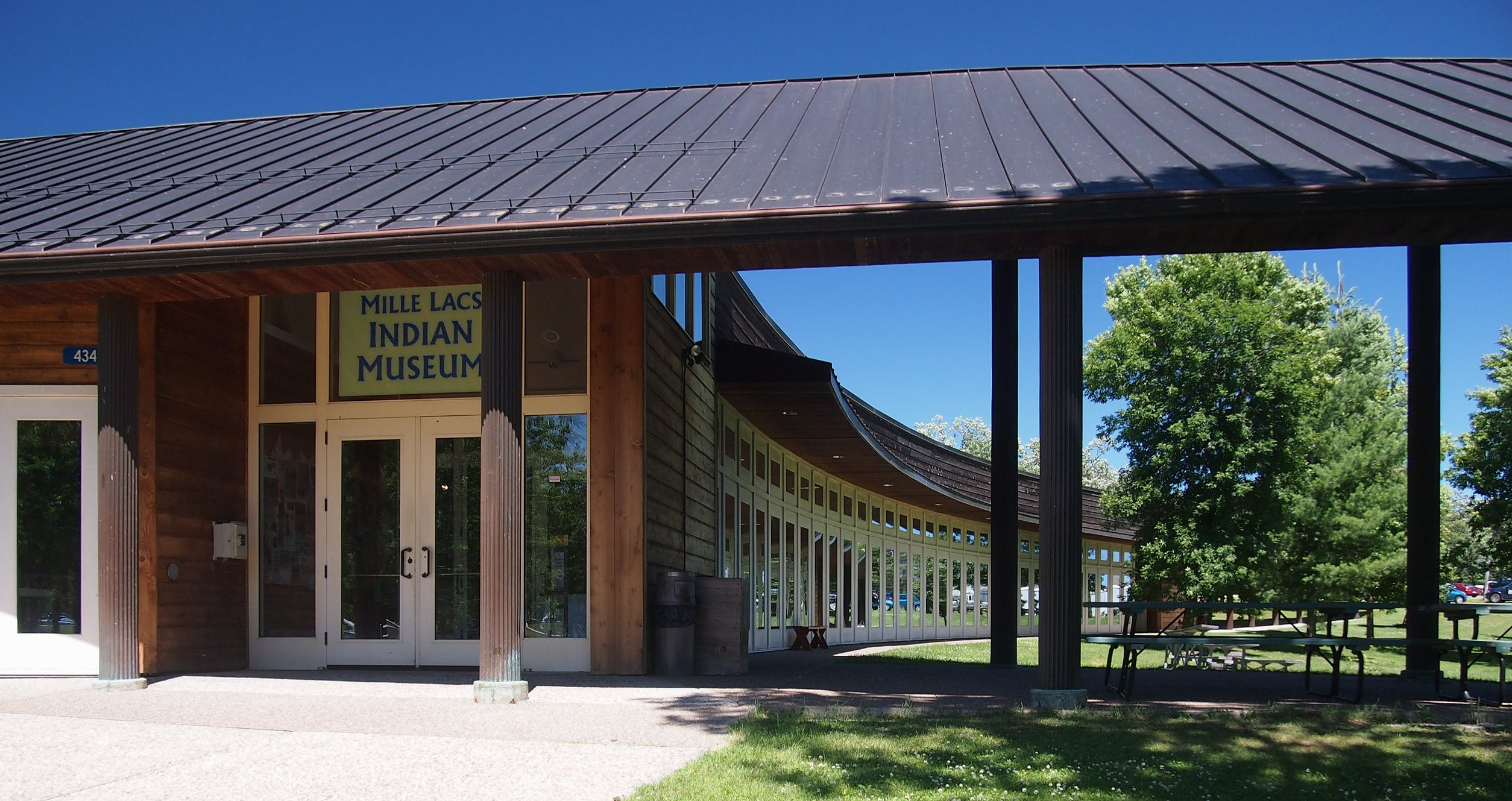
- Mille Lacs Indian Museum

- Location within Minnesota
- Established: 1996
- Location: 43411 Oodena Drive, Onamia, Minnesota
- Coordinates: 46°10′36″N 93°45′21″W
- Type: Native American museum

The Mille Lacs Indian Museum and Trading Post is a museum dedicated to the Mille Lacs Band of Ojibwe's history, culture, and contemporary life. It officially opened to the public on May 18, 1996. Located in Onamia, Minnesota, United States, it is one of the 26 historical sites and museums run by the Minnesota Historical Society.

== History of the land ==
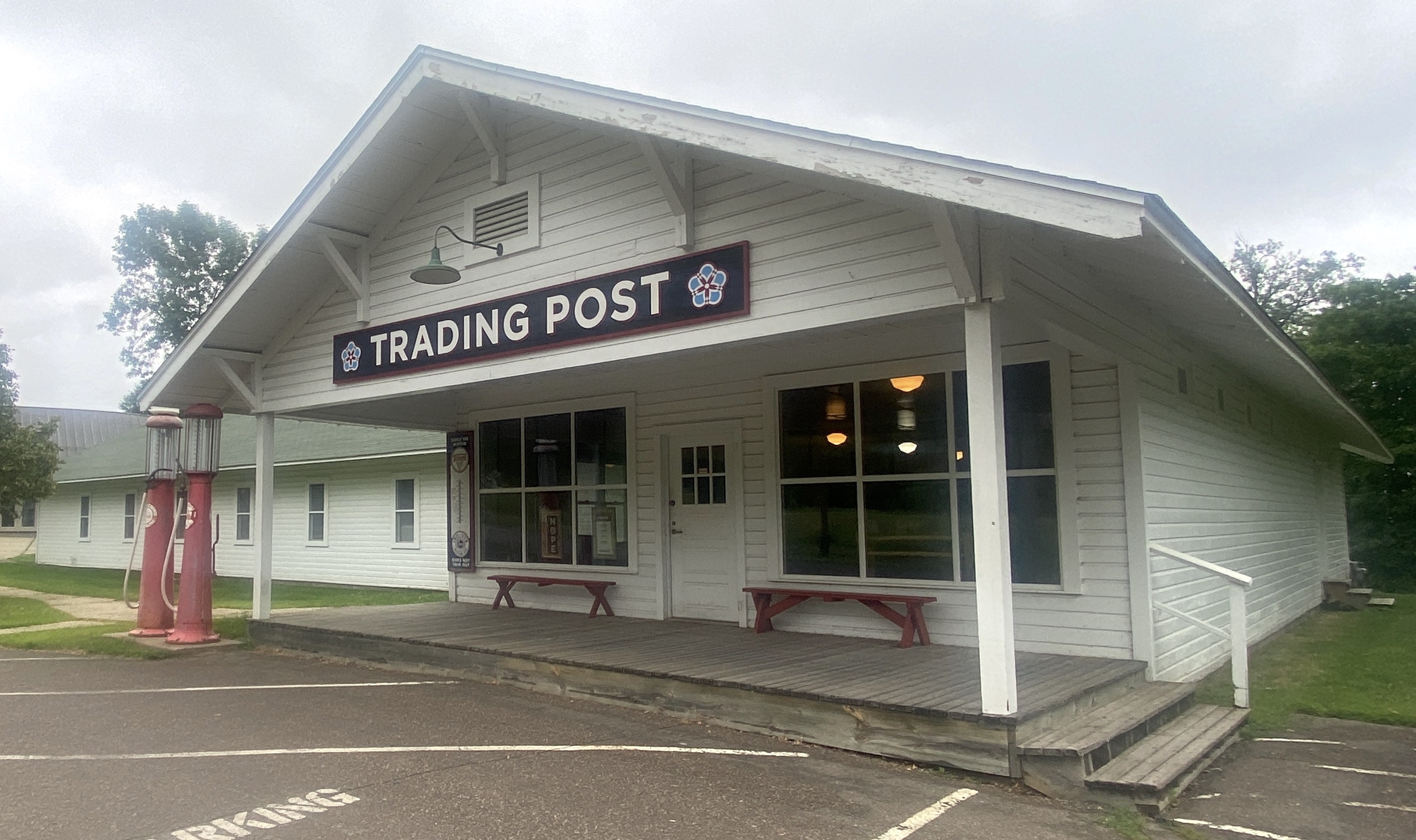
The restored Ayers trading post, now the museum's gift shop

The earliest records of European settlement dates back to 1884 when D.H. Robbins homesteaded near what is now the museum site, but, of course, the Ojibwe Tribe had been in the area long before European settlement. In the late 19th century and early 20th century, Robbins operated a sawmill, farm and trading post on the land. In 1916, Robbins sold part of his land to Harry and Jeanette Ayer, and in 1918, he sold the rest of his property and buildings to the U.S. government.

In 1930 the Ayers bought another 63 acres (250,000 m^{2}) of lakeshore and begin to rent cabins to hunters and visitors. By 1937 the Ayers' resort business was fully established with cabins, boats, a dining hall, a boat dock, a boat factory, a maple sugar syrup refinery, a gas station, a trading post and store. In 1959 Harry Ayer donated the buildings, land, and his collection of American Indian artifacts to the Minnesota Historical Society. The Society opened an exhibit of the artifacts in 1960 and by 1969 opened the "Four Seasons" exhibit to the public. The original building that these exhibits were placed in was closed in 1992 to make way for the new museum.

== Museum features ==
The exhibits show the history of the Ojibwe tribe in Minnesota and incorporates both the English and Ojibwe languages. They feature the artifacts that were collected over the years by the Ayers. The Ayer Collection has 2,200 historical artifacts including bandolier bags, moccasins and birch-bark baskets.

The "Four Seasons Room" is the center-piece of the museum. The room features life-size dioramas, made in 1964, that depict traditional Ojibwe activities. They show the different activities based on seasons, including summer berry picking, fall wild ricing, winter hunting and trapping, and spring maple syrup camp. Other exhibits include:

- "Our Living Culture" displays contemporary Pow-wow outfits.
- "Making a Living" documents the economic history of the Ojibwe people for the past century.
- "Nation Within a Nation" discusses how the Mille Lacs Band of Ojibwe have dealt with sovereignty and self-governance rights.
