= Pete & Cleo =

2010 film

- Directed by: Holt Hamilton
- Written by: Holt Hamilton
- Produced by: Travis Hamilton (Navajoland producer); Julius C. Tulley (executive producer); Rebekah Hamilton
- Starring: Ernest "Ernie" David Tsosie III; Beau Benally; Ethel Begay
- Cinematography: Holt Hamilton
- Edited by: Derek Natzke
- Distributed by: Holt Hamilton Productions (United States)
- Release date: July 8, 2010
- Running time: 80 minutes
- Country: United States
- Languages: English; Navajo

Pete & Cleo is a 2010 independent comedy-drama film written and directed by Holt Hamilton.

== Cast ==
- Ernest "Ernie" David Tsosie III as Pete
- Beau Benally as Cleo
- Ethel Begay as Shima

== See also ==
- Turquoise Rose
- Blue Gap Boy'z
- James and Ernie, a Navajo comedy duo
