= Kayenta, Arizona =

CDP in Navajo County, Arizona

Kayenta, Arizona Tó Dínéeshzheeʼ (Navajo)
- Census-designated place
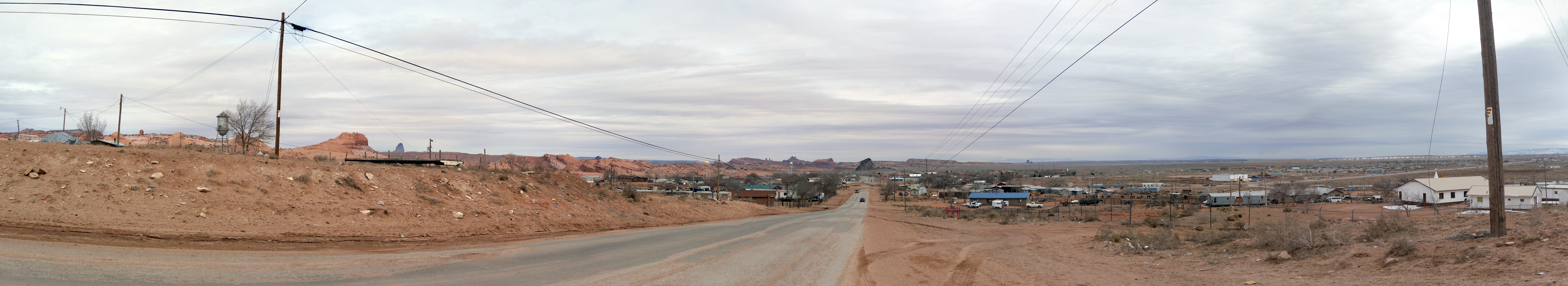
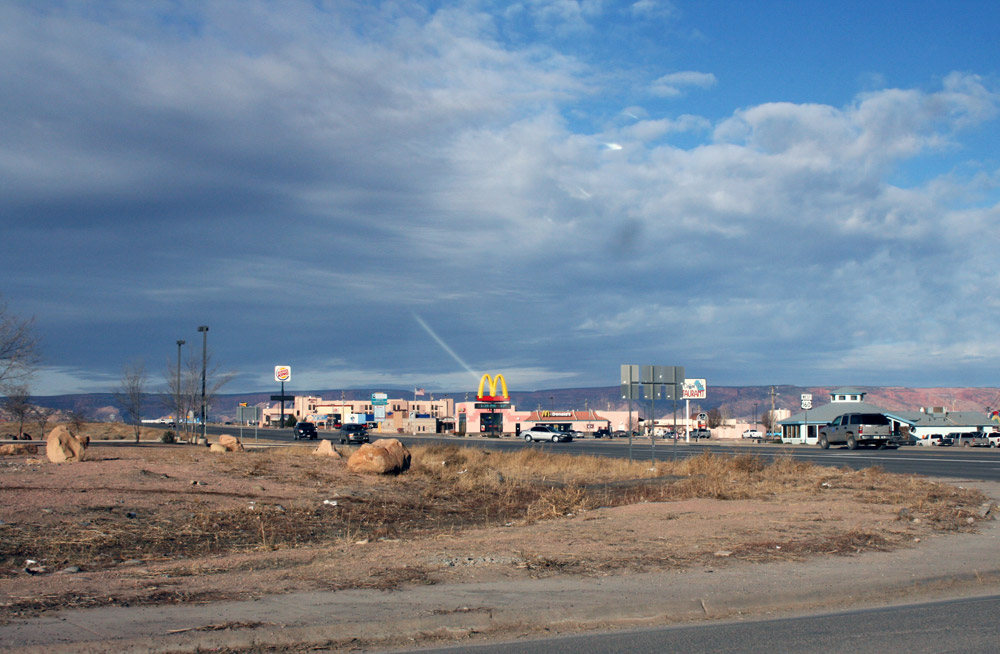
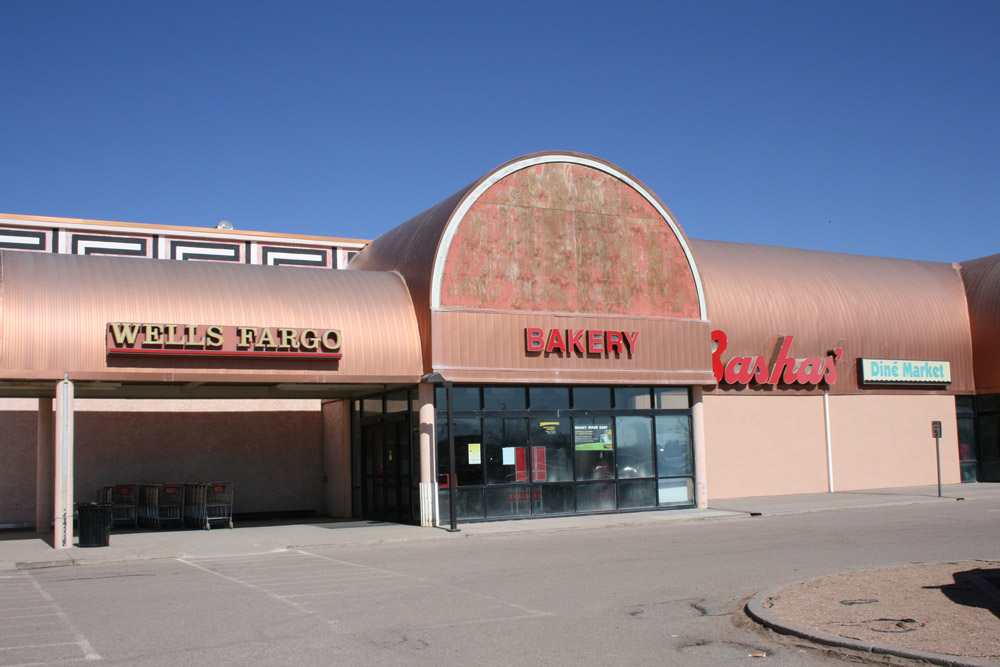
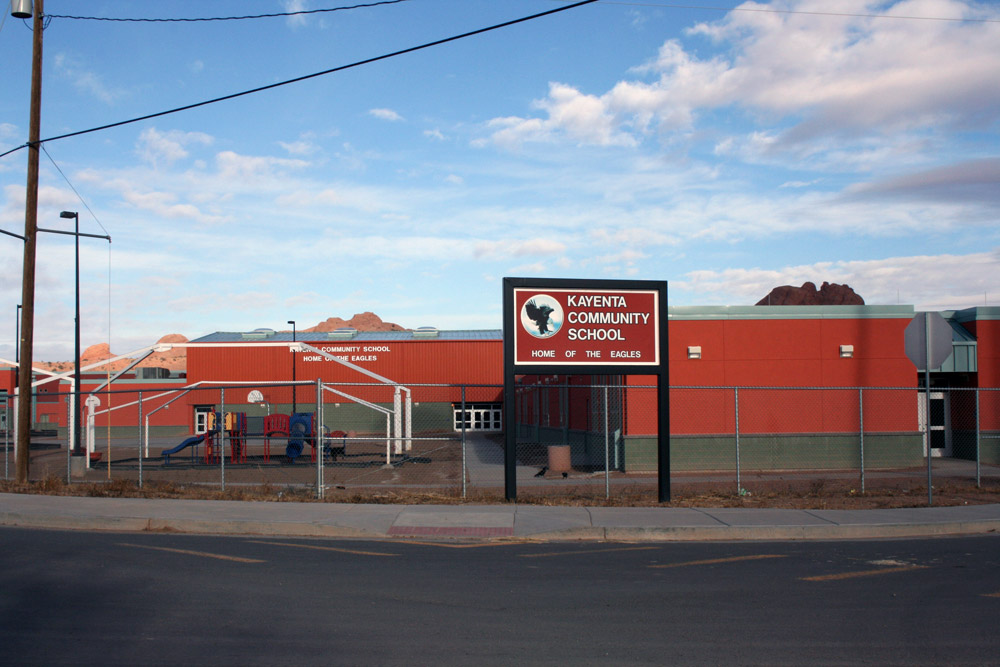
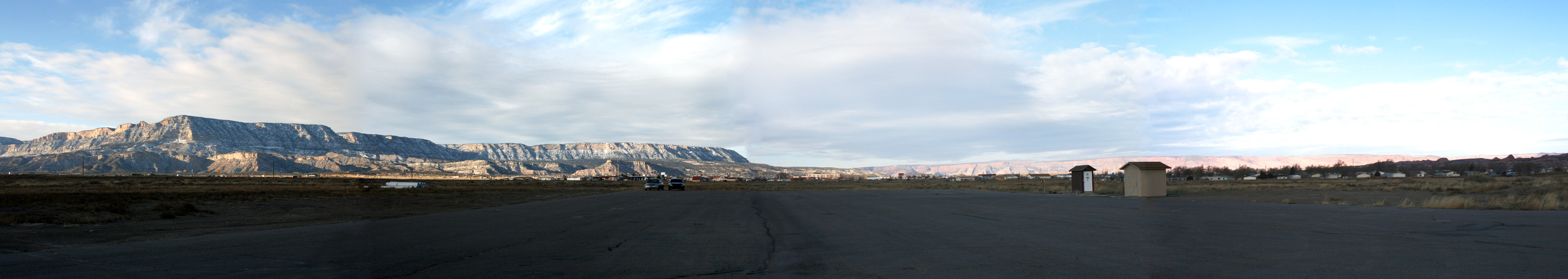
- A panorama of Kayenta, downtown Kayenta in 2011, a Bashas' Diné store, the Kayenta Community School, the outskirts of Kayenta

- Flag

- Location in Navajo County and the U.S. state of Arizona
- Coordinates: 36°42′45″N 110°14′52″W
- Country: United States
- State: Arizona
- County: Navajo

Area
  - Total: 13.24 sq mi (34.28 km^{2})
  - Land: 13.17 sq mi (34.12 km^{2})
  - Water: 0.062 sq mi (0.16 km^{2})
- Elevation: 5,712 ft (1,741 m)

Population (2020)
  - Total: 4,670
  - Density: 354.5/sq mi (136.89/km^{2})
- Time zone: UTC-7 (MST)
  - Summer (DST): UTC-6 (MDT)
- ZIP code: 86033
- Area code: 928
- FIPS code: 04-36990
- GNIS feature ID: 2408461

Kayenta (Navajo: Tó Dínéeshzheeʼ, meaning "Fingers of Water" because of how water runs down the local rock formations when it rains) is a U.S. town which is part of the Navajo Nation and is in Navajo County, Arizona, United States. Established November 13, 1986, the Kayenta Township is unique in currently being the only "township" existing under the laws of the Navajo Nation.

The population was 4,670 at the 2020 census, down from 5,189 at the 2010 census. Kayenta is located at the junction of U.S. Route 160 and the southern end of U.S. Route 163. It is 25 miles (40 km) south of Monument Valley and contains a number of hotels and motels which serve visitors to Monument Valley. Like other places on the Navajo Nation, it is illegal to serve alcohol. Greater Arizona does not observe Daylight saving time; however, the Navajo Nation does.

Kayenta Township is the only municipal-style government on the Navajo Nation. It is regarded as a political sub-division of the Navajo Nation. It is managed by a five-member elected town board, which hires the township manager.

Kayenta is the name for the chapter (a political division within the Navajo Nation that is analogous to a county within a state), as well as the township. Kayenta Chapter encompasses land in both Utah and Arizona. Thus, the Navajo Nation's census figures for Kayenta Chapter are significantly different from those of Kayenta proper.

Kayenta is also the name of one of the seven Navajo Nation Police districts.

== Geography ==
According to the United States Census Bureau, the CDP has a total area of 13.2 square miles (34 km^{2}), all land.

=== Climate ===
According to the Köppen Climate Classification system, Kayenta has a semi-arid climate, abbreviated "BSk" on climate maps.

Climate data for Kayenta, Arizona (Betatakin, 1991–2020 normals, extremes 1939–present)
Month	Jan	Feb	Mar	Apr	May	Jun	Jul	Aug	Sep	Oct	Nov	Dec	Year
Record high °F (°C)	61 (16)	69 (21)	76 (24)	90 (32)	94 (34)	101 (38)	100 (38)	98 (37)	96 (36)	93 (34)	70 (21)	78 (26)	101 (38)
Mean maximum °F (°C)	51.8 (11.0)	55.9 (13.3)	65.6 (18.7)	74.1 (23.4)	82.8 (28.2)	91.3 (32.9)	93.5 (34.2)	90.7 (32.6)	86.0 (30.0)	77.0 (25.0)	64.4 (18.0)	54.1 (12.3)	94.5 (34.7)
Mean daily maximum °F (°C)	39.9 (4.4)	43.8 (6.6)	52.5 (11.4)	60.7 (15.9)	70.8 (21.6)	82.1 (27.8)	85.7 (29.8)	82.9 (28.3)	76.2 (24.6)	63.9 (17.7)	50.7 (10.4)	40.3 (4.6)	62.5 (16.9)
Mean daily minimum °F (°C)	22.0 (−5.6)	24.5 (−4.2)	30.2 (−1.0)	35.1 (1.7)	44.3 (6.8)	54.6 (12.6)	60.1 (15.6)	58.2 (14.6)	51.7 (10.9)	41.2 (5.1)	30.2 (−1.0)	22.1 (−5.5)	39.5 (4.2)
Mean minimum °F (°C)	7.3 (−13.7)	10.3 (−12.1)	16.6 (−8.6)	20.4 (−6.4)	29.3 (−1.5)	41.0 (5.0)	51.0 (10.6)	49.0 (9.4)	38.4 (3.6)	25.4 (−3.7)	13.8 (−10.1)	7.8 (−13.4)	2.8 (−16.2)
Record low °F (°C)	−11 (−24)	−14 (−26)	2 (−17)	0 (−18)	19 (−7)	28 (−2)	31 (−1)	33 (1)	23 (−5)	7 (−14)	−2 (−19)	−14 (−26)	−14 (−26)
Average precipitation inches (mm)	1.17 (30)	1.03 (26)	0.79 (20)	0.64 (16)	0.58 (15)	0.18 (4.6)	1.23 (31)	1.45 (37)	1.23 (31)	0.96 (24)	0.69 (18)	1.16 (29)	11.11 (282)
Average snowfall inches (cm)	8.3 (21)	9.1 (23)	3.7 (9.4)	3.3 (8.4)	0.4 (1.0)	0.0 (0.0)	0.0 (0.0)	0.0 (0.0)	0.0 (0.0)	0.3 (0.76)	3.2 (8.1)	7.2 (18)	35.5 (90)
Average precipitation days (≥ 0.01 inch)	5.0	5.1	4.2	2.9	3.0	1.3	5.8	6.6	4.5	3.4	3.7	4.7	50.2
Average snowy days (≥ 0.1 inch)	4.1	3.4	2.0	1.0	0.1	0.0	0.0	0.0	0.0	0.3	2.1	3.8	16.8
Source: National Oceanic and Atmospheric Administration

== Demographics ==
Historical population
Census	Pop.	Note	%±
2020	4,670		—
U.S. Decennial Census

=== 2020 census ===
As of the 2020 census, Kayenta had a population of 4,670. The median age was 31.3 years. Almost a third of residents (32.3%) were under the age of 18 and 10.7% of residents were 65 years of age or older. For every 100 females there were 94.1 males, and for every 100 females age 18 and over there were 88.3 males age 18 and over.

According to the census, 0.0% of residents lived in urban areas, while 100.0% lived in rural areas.

There were 1,265 households in Kayenta, of which 49.6% had children under the age of 18 living in them. Of all households, 39.4% were married-couple households, 18.7% were households with a male householder and no spouse or partner present, and 35.5% were households with a female householder and no spouse or partner present. About 16.2% of all households were made up of individuals and 4.9% had someone living alone who was 65 years of age or older.

There were 1,403 housing units, of which 9.8% were vacant. The homeowner vacancy rate was 0.0% and the rental vacancy rate was 5.1%.

Racial composition as of the 2020 census
Race	Number	Percent
White	113	2.4%
Black or African American	5	0.1%
American Indian and Alaska Native	4,450	95.3%
Asian	0	0.0%
Native Hawaiian and Other Pacific Islander	0	0.0%
Some other race	6	0.1%
Two or more races	96	2.1%
Hispanic or Latino (of any race)	48	1.0%

=== 2010 census ===
As of the 2010 census, there were 5,189 people. The population density was 393.1 inhabitants per square mile (151.8/km^{2}) with a total of 1,375 housing units. The racial makeup of the CDP was 92.3% Native American, 4.6% White, 0.2% Black or African American, 0.2% Asian, less than 0.1% Pacific Islander, 0.3% from other races, and 2.5% from two or more races. Hispanics or Latinos of any race comprised 2.0% of the population.

In the CDP, the population was spread out, with 38.9% under the age of 18, 11.4% from 18 to 24, 11.9% from 25 to 34, 33.2% from 35 to 64, and 4.7% who were 65 years of age or older. The median age was 22 years. For every 100 females, there were 90.7 males.

== Events ==
The Kayenta Fourth of July Rodeo is an annual multi-day event taking place from July 1–4. Various events take place daily, while the "Best of the Best" and a fireworks show take place on the fourth. The Kayenta Fourth of July Rodeo has been recognized six times as the Rodeo of the Year and twice as the Outstanding Rodeo by the All Indian Rodeo Cowboys Association, making it one of the premier rodeos to attend in the Southwest.

== Education ==
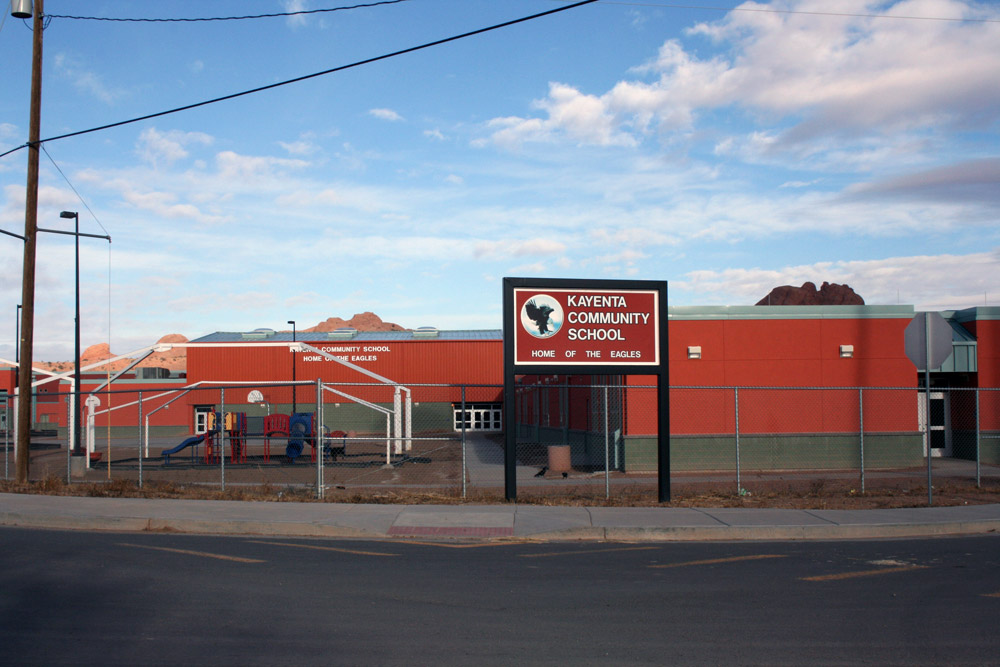
Kayenta Community School of the Bureau of Indian Education

Kayenta is served by the Kayenta Unified School District. The Kayenta Unified School District operates several schools serving the communities of Kayenta, Chilchinbeto, Dennehotso, and Shonto. These include Debbie Braff Elementary School (formerly Kayenta Intermediate School and Kayenta Elementary School), Baker Middle School (formerly Kayenta Middle School), Monument Valley High School, and the ABC Preschool (formerly Kayenta Primary School). Recent decisions to rename some schools have been made to honor specific individuals from the community. While the school board has cited community support for these changes, some public discussion and debate continue.

The Kayenta Unified School District #27 is governed by a five-member board of trustees elected by popular vote. The Governing Board consists of a President, Board Clerk, and three members operating within the laws of the Arizona State Legislature, rules and regulations of the Arizona State Board of Education and Navajo County Superintendent of Schools to set policies for management of the school district.

Iverna Parrish-John is the President of the governing board for the Kayenta Unified School District.

Kayenta Community School, a K-8 school operated by the Bureau of Indian Education, This facility, also known as Kayenta Boarding School, is a boarding school serving both day and dormitory students.

== Community ==
=== Local facilities ===
Kayenta has a large recreation center dedicated to serving the local community. Just outside the Recreation Center is a skating park, as well as an outdoor park with several playgrounds for children. On the east side of the community is Kayenta Airport; it can handle small single engine and twin engine aircraft used for air tours and air ambulance services.

In the western part of the township there is a Navajo Nation Police station and the Navajo Nation Department of Corrections has a facility that can house 84 inmates adjacent to it.

=== Churches ===
Many religious organizations are represented in Kayenta. There are churches for Baptists, Presbyterian Church, Lamb of God Pentecostal Church, Potter's House Christian Church, Kayenta Church of Christ, The Living Word Assembly of God Church Assemblies of God, Catholic Church (Our Lady of Guadalupe), a meetinghouse for the Church of Jesus Christ of Latter-day Saints, and a Kingdom Hall for Jehovah's Witnesses. Also there is a Bible church located on the hill of Kayenta.

== See also ==
- Kayenta Formation
- Monument Valley Film Festival
- All Indian Rodeo Cowboys Association
