= Native American genealogy =

Field of genealogy pertaining to Native Americans

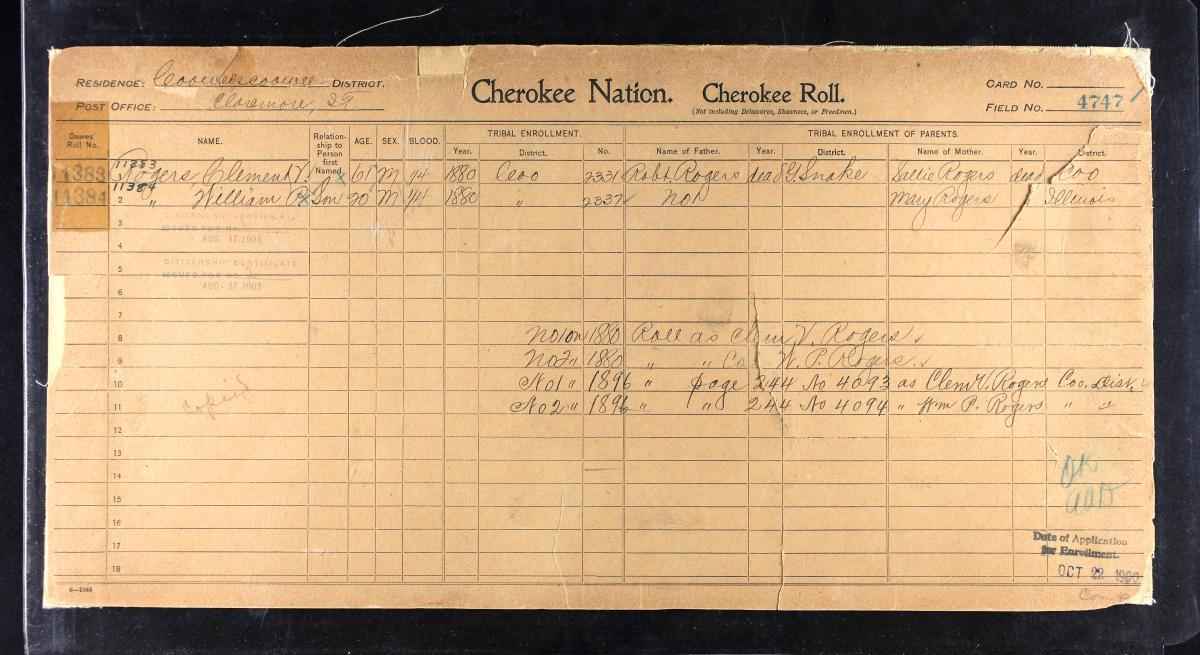
Approved Cherokee Nation roll of the Dawes Rolls, 1900. Clement Rogers and son, Will.

Native American genealogy is a field of genealogy pertaining specifically to Native Americans in the United States. Native American ancestry can be traced through genealogical research, most importantly documentation of ancestors on Native American tribal rolls. Native American ancestry may also be noted on other forms of documentation from 1774 and on, such as federal censuses, residential school records, and military service records. Eligibility for citizenship in federally recognized tribes in the United States is often determined by having an ancestor who is listed as Indian by blood or as a Native American Freedman on a tribal roll, particularly in the case of tribes that go by lineal descent rather than by blood quantum. Documents related to Native American genealogy have been extensively archived and digitized, with many records available for public view through websites including the National Archives, the Oklahoma Historical Society, Ancestry.com, Fold3, and many others.

Many Americans believe themselves to have Native American ancestry, but have no genealogical proof that any ancestors were Native Americans. The most commonly claimed Native American ancestry without documentation is Cherokee ancestry. While it is a common belief that Native American genealogy is poorly documented, Family Tree Magazine has stated that "massive collections...make Indians living with tribes the most extensively documented post-1885 US ancestors". The genealogist David Cornsilk has stated that "Cherokees are among the best documented people in the world" alongside "royalty and Mormons."

== About ==
The National Indian Child Welfare Association (NICWA) has published guidelines for researching Native American genealogy. According to NICWA, the best ways to research Native American genealogy are to "Research and identify as many members of a family tree as possible", to "Search Indian-specific records to confirm relationship to tribe", and to "Seek assistance from the tribe to establish a relationship or enroll."

According to the Library of Congress, many families have lore about Native American ancestry, but that genealogy can be used to prove or disprove these family traditions.

Not all Americans who have some Native American ancestry are citizens of tribes or eligible for tribal citizenship. Some non-enrolled descendants from federally recognized tribes may qualify for a Certificate of Degree of Indian Blood even if they are not eligible for citizenship in any tribe.

=== Native American genealogical resources ===
Vital records that may contain documentation of Native American genealogy may include tribal rolls, state and federal censuses, birth and death records, marriage records, military records including draft cards, church records, hospital records, school records, cemetery records, and other sources of documentation. Native Americans may find genealogical information about their ancestors from family Bibles, letters, photographs, deeds, wills, diaries, newspapers, library and university collections, and other public or personal items and papers.

==== Native American tribal rolls ====
Beginning in 1885, US agents and superintendents of American Indian reservations began to submit annual census rolls. Because of this, much of Native American genealogy following 1885 is better documented compared to Americans who are not Native.

The Dawes Rolls has been digitized in searchable form by the Oklahoma Historical Society. The Dawes Rolls list individuals who are Choctaw, Cherokee, Chickasaw, Seminole and Muscogee, including Freedmen, Delaware Indians, and Mississippi Choctaw.

The digitized Guion Miller Roll is available on Fold3, a website owned by Ancestry.com.

==== Federal censuses ====
Because American Indians were typically not citizens of the United States prior to the Indian Citizenship Act of 1924, American Indians were not included in census data between 1790 and 1840 and few are included prior to 1900. Individuals are rarely listed as American Indians on the 1850 United States census. The first Americans Indians living in the general population to be counted were listed on the 1860 United States census. Beginning with the 1900 census, both American Indians living on reservations and in the general population are counted.

In 1921, a fire at the Department of Commerce destroyed almost all records from the 1890 United States census, including some records relating to American Indians.

==== Tribal services ====
Some tribes, such as the Eastern Band of Cherokee Indians, provide research services for searching genealogical records. Such research does not necessarily aid a person's eligibility for or enrollment in the tribe.

=== False beliefs about ancestry ===
According to Family Tree Magazine, the "Indian princess myth" is a genealogical myth that many American families have that a female ancestor was a Cherokee or otherwise Native American princess. However, royalty did not exist among the Cherokee or any other American Indian tribe.

== See also ==
- African American genealogy
- Cherokee descent
- Índia pega no laço
- Indigenous identity fraud in Canada and the United States
- Native American identity in the United States
- Native American tribal rolls
- Pretendian
- Racial isolates in the United States
