= Baker Roll =

The Baker Roll of the Eastern Band of Cherokee Indians was created by the Eastern Cherokee Enrolling Commission after it was commissioned by the United States Congress on June 4, 1924. The purpose of the Baker Roll was to collect and compile data from older Eastern Cherokee censuses and determine tribal affiliation. The roll is named after Special Agent Fred A. Baker.

== Eastern Band Cherokee enrollment ==
In order for a person to be or become a citizen of the Eastern Band of Cherokee Indians, they must:

1. Have a direct lineal ancestor who appears on the Baker Roll of 1924.
2. Have a blood quantum of at least 1/16th Eastern Band Cherokee ancestry.

Blood quantum is traced from the ancestor listed on the 1924 Baker Roll. A person with a blood quantum of less than 1/16th is an Eastern Band Cherokee descendant, but not a tribal citizen. The Eastern Band Cherokee nation does not allow DNA testing to be used to determine tribal citizenship, unless the test is to determine parentage. Individuals who are not citizens of the Eastern Band but who believe they have Eastern Band heritage can fill out a Baker Roll search form with the Eastern Band's tribal enrollment office. The form must list the applicant's ancestors as well as their dates of birth and death. Applicants must also submit a DNA test to prove a biological connection to a recent ancestor, such as a parent or a grandparent, who was an enrolled citizen.

== See also ==
- 1896 Applications for Enrollment, Five Tribes (Overturned)
- Blood quantum laws
- Cherokee descent
- Dawes Rolls
- Guion Miller Roll
- Hester Roll
- Native American identity in the United States
- Native American tribal rolls
- United Keetoowah Band Base Roll
