= United Keetoowah Band Base Roll =

The 1949 United Keetoowah Band Base Roll is a tribal roll of the United Keetoowah Band of Cherokee Indians.

== History ==
The United Keetoowah Band of Cherokee Indians was federally recognized as an American Indian tribe by an Act of Congress on August 10th, 1946. All individuals listed on the 1949 UKB Base Roll were identified by an April 19th, 1949 resolution that was certified by the Superintendent of the Bureau of Indian Affairs' Five Civilized Tribes Agency.

The roll is displayed at the John Hair Cultural Center and Keetoowah Museum in Cherokee County, Oklahoma.

== United Keetoowah Band enrollment ==
In order to be eligible for citizenship in the United Keetoowah Band of Cherokee Indians, an individual must prove descent from the 1949 UKB Base Roll or the Dawes Rolls and have a blood quantum of at least 1/4th Keetoowah Cherokee.

== See also ==
- 1896 Applications for Enrollment, Five Tribes (Overturned)
- Baker Roll
- Cherokee descent
- Dawes Rolls
- Hester Roll
- Guion Miller Roll
- Native American tribal rolls
