= Hester Roll =

The Hester Roll is a Cherokee census roll that was taken in 1883 by Joseph G. Hester. The census listed new citizens of the Eastern Band of Cherokee Indians, whether by birth or by adoption.

Other Cherokee census rolls include:

- 1835 Census of Cherokees Living East of the Mississippi River (also known as the Henderson Roll)
- 1848 Mullay Roll
- 1851 Siler Roll
- 1852 Chapman Roll
- 1854 Act of Congress Roll
- 1867 Powell Roll
- 1869 Swetland Roll
- 1898–1914 Dawes Rolls
- 1924 Baker Roll
- 1949 United Keetoowah Band Base Roll

== See also ==
- 1896 Applications for Enrollment, Five Tribes (Overturned)
- Cherokee descent
- Guion Miller Roll
- Native American tribal rolls
