= Guion Miller Roll =

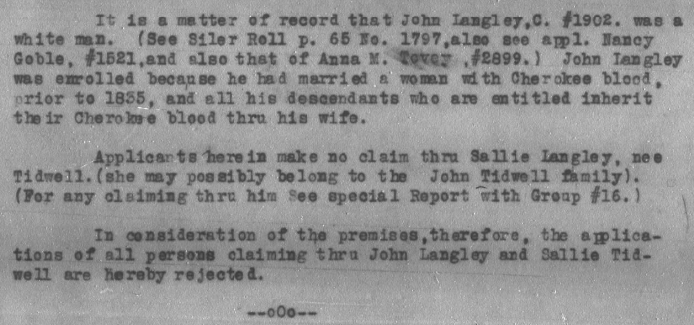
Excerpt from a rejected Guion Miller Roll application: "It is a matter of public record that John Langley, C. #1902. was a white man...the applications of all persons claiming thru John Langley and Sallie Tidwell are hereby rejected."

The Guion Miller Roll is a roll created by the US government between 1906 and 1911 to document Eastern Cherokee people, for the purposes of distributing money paid as restitution for the violation of treaties.

== History ==
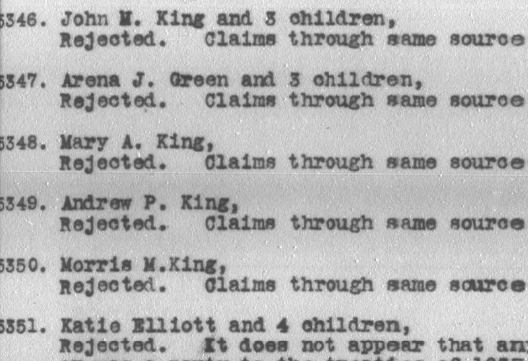
Rejected applications for the Guion Miller Roll.

In 1902, Congress authorized the U.S. Court of Claims to began hearing cases related to the violation of Cherokee treaties. The Eastern Cherokee filed three claims alleging that the US government had violated the 1835 and 1846 Cherokee treaties. The Court of Claims consolidated the three complaints into one case and eventually, on 18 May 1905, the court ruled in favor of the tribe. Eligible tribal citizens were awarded over $1 million. The roll was compiled by Interior Department Special Commissioner Guion Miller. Miller used previous applications and rolls in order to verify the tribal citizenship of applicants to the roll.

About 90,000 individuals applied for the Guion Miller Roll. Only 30,254 individuals, about one-third of all applicants, were enrolled as entitled to funds. Of the accepted applicants, 3,203 lived east of the Mississippi River and 30,254 lived west of the river.

The Cherokee Nation and the United Keetoowah Band of Cherokee Indians (UKB) use the Guion Miller Roll and the Dawes Rolls in order to determine eligibility for tribal citizenship. The UKB also uses the 1949 United Keetoowah Band Base Roll. The Eastern Band of Cherokee Indians only uses the Baker Roll to determine eligibility for tribal citizenship.

The digitized Guion Miller Roll is available on Fold3, a website owned by Ancestry.com.

== See also ==
- 1896 Applications for Enrollment, Five Tribes (Overturned)
- Blood quantum laws
- Cherokee descent
- Baker Roll
- Dawes Rolls
- Hester Roll
- Indigenous identity fraud in Canada and the United States
- Native American identity in the United States
- Native American tribal rolls
- United Keetoowah Band Base Roll
