= Certificate of Degree of Indian Blood =

U.S. Document

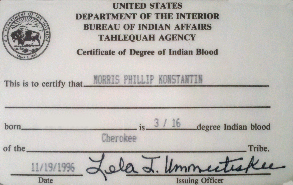
Certificate Degree of Indian Blood issued in 1996

A Certificate of Degree of Indian Blood or Certificate of Degree of Alaska Native Blood (both abbreviated CDIB) is an official U.S. document that certifies an individual possesses a specific fraction of Native American ancestry of a federally recognized Indian tribe, band, nation, pueblo, village, or community. They are issued by the Bureau of Indian Affairs after the applicant supplies a completed genealogy with supporting legal documents such as birth certificates, showing their descent, through one or both birth parents, from an enrolled Indian or an Indian listed in a base roll such as the Dawes Rolls. Blood degree cannot be obtained through adoptive parents. The blood degree on previously issued CDIBs or on the base rolls in the filer's ancestry are used to determine the filer's blood degree (unless they challenge them as inaccurate). Information collected for the filing is held confidential by privacy laws, except if the CDIB is related to assigned duties.

A CDIB can show only the blood degree of one tribe or the total blood degree from all tribes in the filer's ancestry. Some tribes require a specific minimum degree of tribal ancestry for membership, which might require the first type of certificate, while some federal benefits programs require a minimum total Indian blood degree so an individual might require the second type of certificate to qualify. For example, the Eastern Band of Cherokee Indians requires at least 1/16 degree of Eastern Cherokee blood for tribal membership, whereas the Bureau of Indian Affairs' Higher Education Grant for college expenses requires a 1/4 degree minimum.

A Certificate of Degree of Indian Blood does not establish membership in a tribe. Tribal membership is determined by tribal laws and may or may not require a CDIB or may require a separate tribal determination of ancestry or blood degree.

Absent enrollment or membership in a tribe, an CDIB may be used to access Indian Health Services and determine State or Federal criminal jurisdiction over an individual in Indian Country.

The CDIB is controversial, from a racial politics perspective, and because non-federally recognized tribes are neither eligible for the card nor for the benefits which require one. Some groups, such as the Cherokee freedmen, were often not eligible for a CDIB because they are not Native American by blood or their degree of blood was not recorded in the base rolls (where Freedman was used instead of stating a degree).

== See also ==
- Blood quantum laws
- Pedigree chart
- Judicial aspects of race in the United States
