= Native American tribal rolls =

Record of citizens of Native American tribes

Native American tribal rolls are records created by the US federal government or by federally recognized American Indian tribes that document citizens of American Indian and Alaska Native tribes and bands, including Freedmen. The Bureau of Indian Affairs historically created a variety of tribal rolls, including allotment rolls, annuity rolls, census rolls, judgement rolls, and removal rolls. Today, tribal rolls are created and maintained directly by tribes themselves. Many tribal rolls have been digitized and are available on the internet, such as the Dawes Rolls, which documents historic citizens of the Five Tribes: the Cherokee, Chickasaw, Choctaw, Seminole, and Muscogee.

== Rolls by type ==
The US federal government has never created a roll listing all individuals who have American Indian ancestry. However, the Bureau of Indian Affairs has created rolls relating to numerous American Indian and Alaska Native tribes. There are varying types of rolls, including allotment rolls, census rolls, annuity rolls, judgement rolls, removal rolls, and others. In contemporary times, tribal rolls are created and maintained directly by tribes themselves rather than by the federal government.

=== Allotment rolls ===
Allotment rolls have to do with land allotment to American Indians. The federal government used land allotment rolls to determine how communally held American Indian lands and American Indian reservations would be divided into parcels to be distributed to American Indian individuals.

=== Annuity rolls ===
Annuity rolls related to payments to tribes that had signed treaties with the federal government. These payments were called "annuities" and annuity rolls were used to determine the eligibility of American Indian individuals for annuity payments. Some payments were money, some were goods, and other times were a combination of money and goods.

=== Census rolls ===
Census rolls refer to tribal rolls recording the general population of American Indian and Alaska Native tribes and bands. Between 1885 and 1940, the Bureau of Indian Affairs created annual census rolls of citizens of federally recognized tribes. These rolls are known as "Indian Census Rolls". The Baker Roll and the Dawes Rolls are examples of census rolls. The 1896 Applications for Enrollment in the Five Tribes were fought by the tribes and ultimately overturned by the Department of the Interior.

=== Judgment rolls ===
Judgment Rolls are tribal rolls created by the U.S. federal government to award monetary damages to tribes, including for damages awarded due to treaty violations. The Indian Affairs Commission and the U.S. Court of Claims sometimes ruled in favor of American Indians causing Congress to appropriate funds for the restitution of American Indians who had been harmed. The Guion Miller Roll is an example of a judgment roll.

=== Removal rolls ===
Removal rolls were rolls created by the federal government in order to list American Indians who were scheduled for expulsion from American Indian land, as part of the process of the ethnic cleansing of American Indians. Removal rolls are sometimes referred to as "muster rolls" or "emigration rolls". The Cherokee Emigration Rolls, 1817–1838, are an example of removal rolls.

== Rolls by tribe ==
=== Catawba Indian Nation ===
Citizens of the Catawba Indian Nation must be of lineal descent from a tribal citizen listed on at least one of the three tribal rolls taken in 1943, 1961, and 2000.

=== Cherokee tribes ===
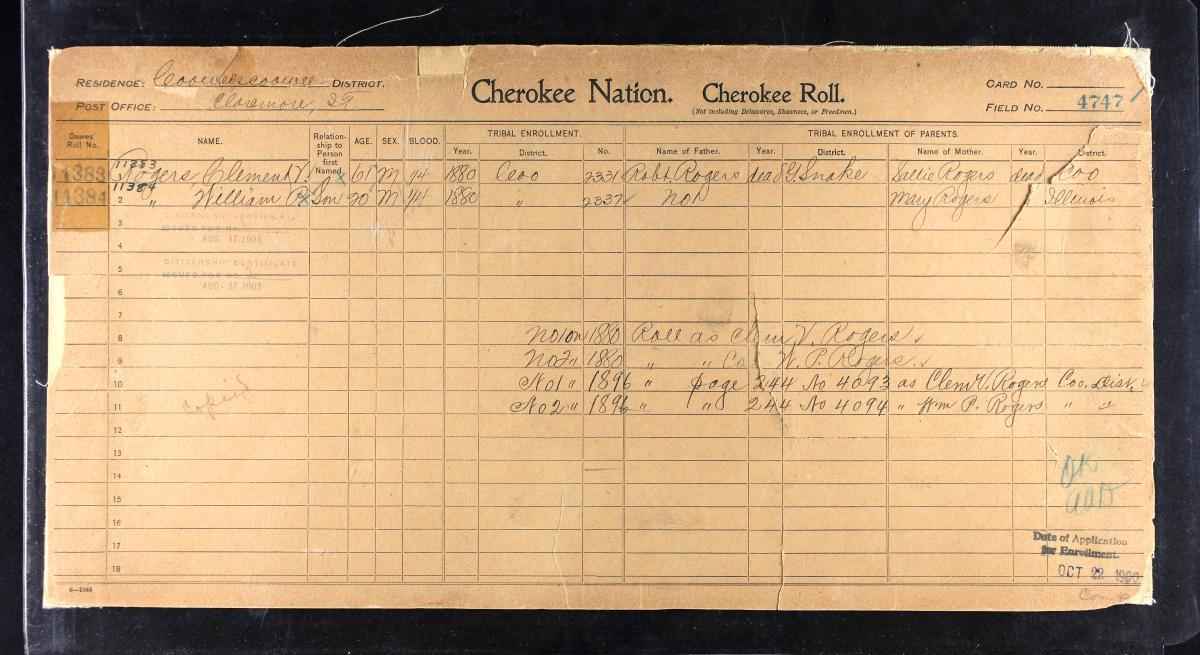
Approved Cherokee Nation roll, 1900.

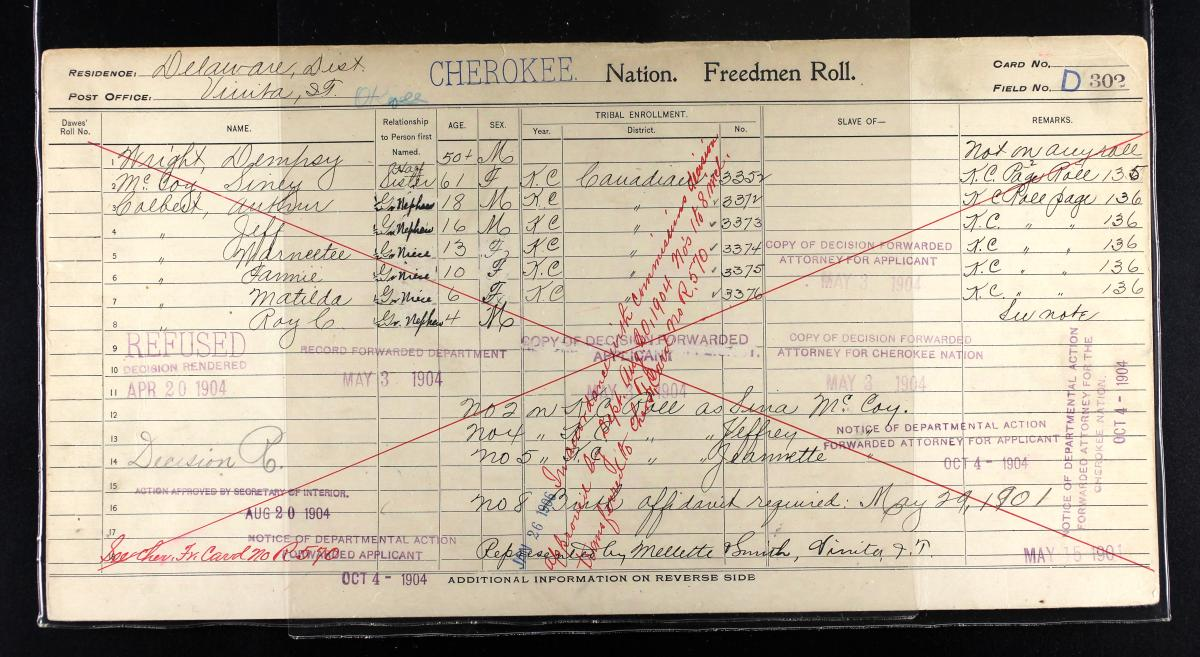
Denied Cherokee Nation Freedmen roll, 1901.

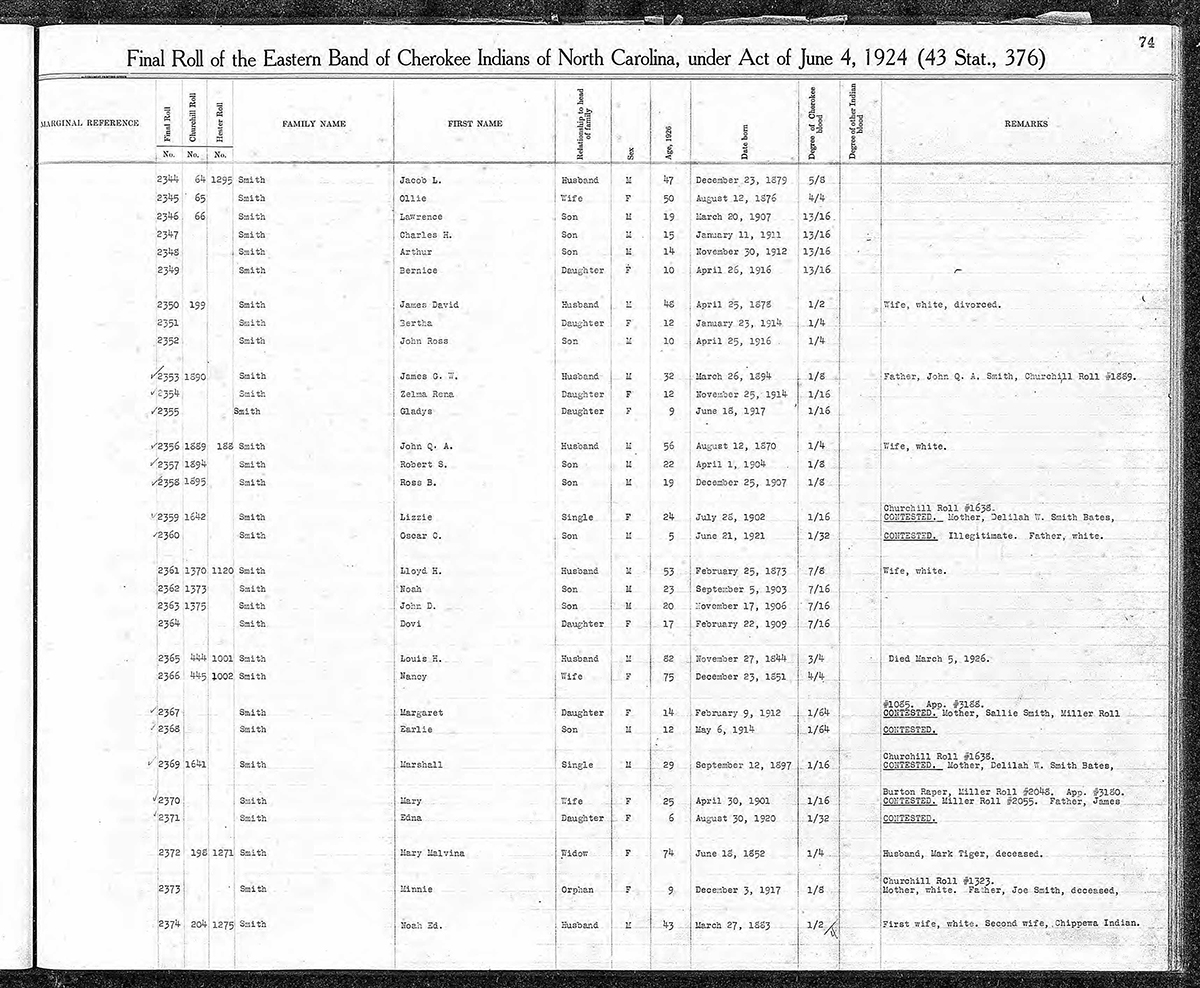
A sample page from the 1924 Baker Roll of the Eastern Band of Cherokee Indians, provided by the National Archives.

There are three federally recognized Cherokee tribes: the Eastern Band of Cherokee Indians (EBCI), the United Keetoowah Band of Cherokee Indians (UKB), and the Cherokee Nation. EBCI uses the Baker Roll to determine eligibility for tribal citizenship. The Cherokee Nation uses the Dawes Rolls to determine tribal citizenship. The UKB uses both the Dawes Rolls and the United Keetoowah Band Base Roll of 1949 to determine tribal citizenship.

The Dawes Rolls has been digitized and is searchable on the website of the Oklahoma Historical Society.

Cherokee tribal rolls include:

- 1817 Reservation Rolls
- 1817-1835 Emigration Rolls
- 1835 Census of Cherokees Living East of the Mississippi River (Henderson Roll)
- 1848 Mullay Roll
- 1851 Siler Roll
- 1851 Old Settler Roll
- 1852 Chapman Roll
- 1852 Drennen Roll
- 1854 Act of Congress Roll
- 1867 Powell Roll
- 1869 Swetland Roll
- 1883 Hester Roll
- 1888 Wallace Roll
- 1896-1897 Kern-Clifton Roll
- 1896 Applications for Enrollment (Overturned)
- 1898-1907 Dawes Roll
- 1908 Churchill Roll
- 1909 Guion Miller Roll
- 1924 Baker Roll
- 1949 United Keetoowah Band Base Roll

=== Chickasaw Nation ===
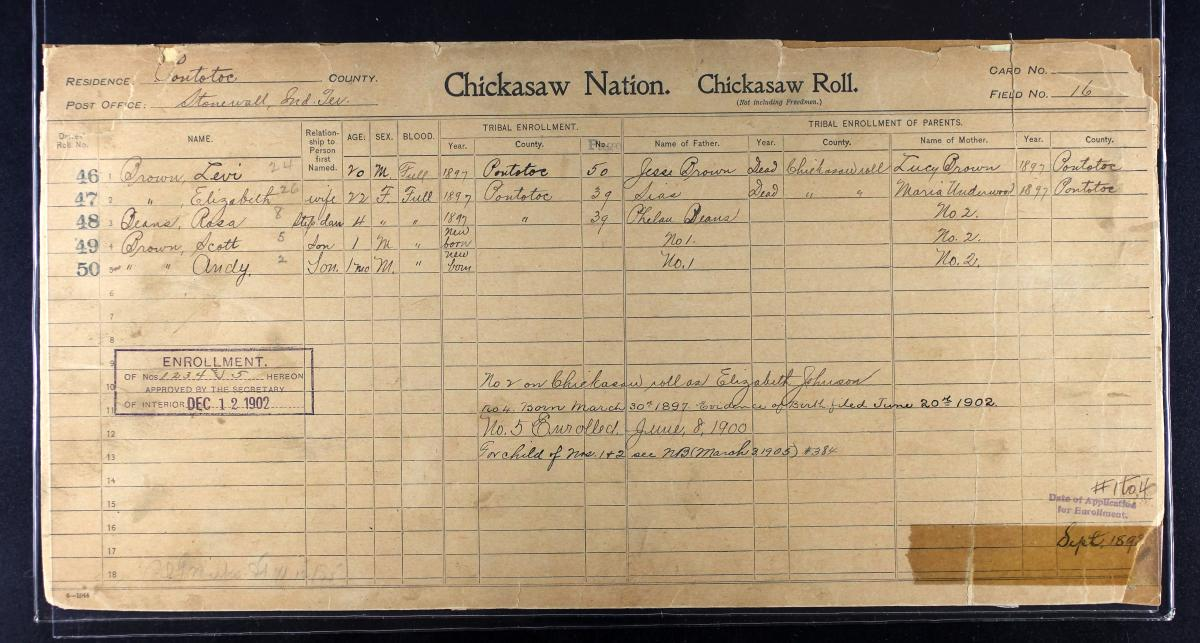
Chickasaw Nation approved roll, 1902.

The Chickasaw Nation uses the Dawes Rolls to determine eligibility for Chickasaw citizenship.

=== Choctaw tribes ===
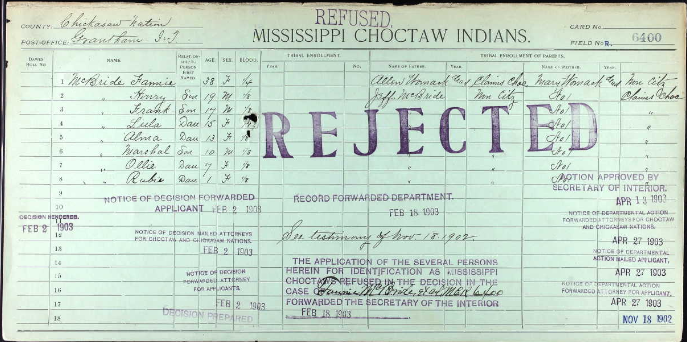
Rejected application for citizenship in the Mississippi Band of Choctaw Indians, 1903.

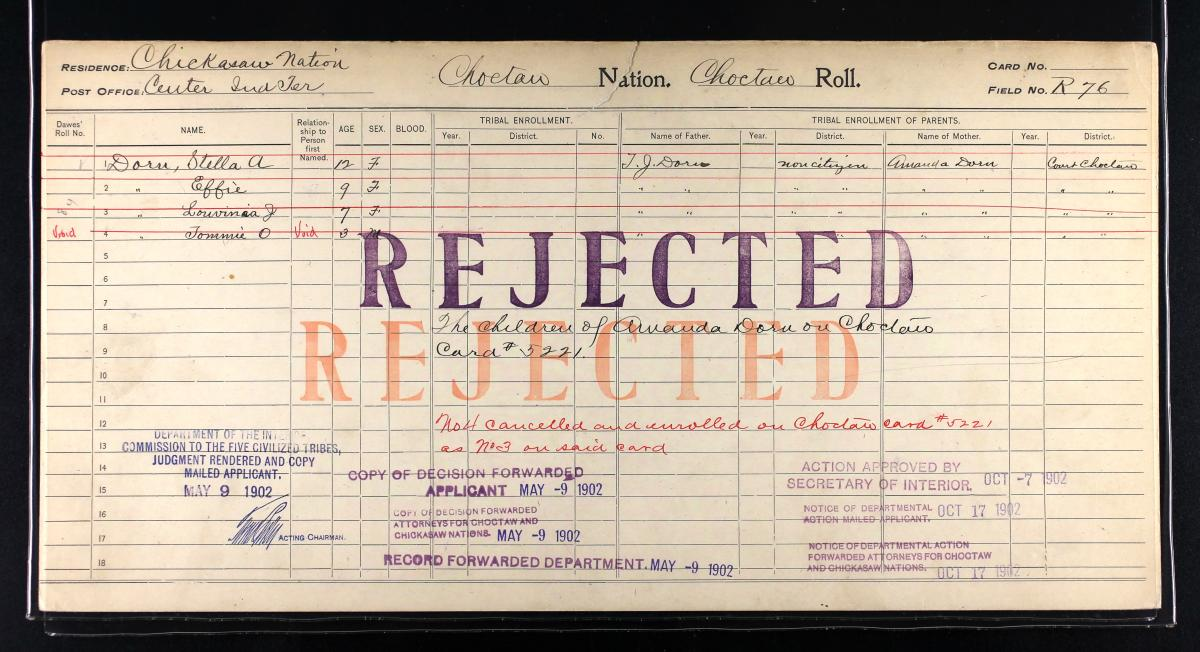
Choctaw Nation of Oklahoma rejected roll, 1902.

There are three federally recognized Choctaw tribes: the Choctaw Nation of Oklahoma (CNO), the Mississippi Band of Choctaw Indians (MBCI), and the Jena Band of Choctaw Indians (JBCI). CNO uses the Dawes Rolls to determine tribal citizenship. According to MBCI, "To be eligible for membership in the Mississippi Band of Choctaw Indians...a person must either: (1) appear on the census roll prepared by the Bureau of Indian Affairs at the Choctaw Agency of all Choctaw Indians resident in Mississippi on January 1, 1940 (commonly referred to as MBCI’s “base roll”); or (2) be the biological child of a MBCI tribal member and have a MBCI blood quantum of one-half (1/2) or more." JBCI requires that a person eligible for citizenship "must be a direct descendant of a member listed on the Official 1995 Tribal Roll."

=== Coeur d'Alene Tribe ===
Eligibility for citizenship in the Coeur d'Alene Tribe is determined by the tribe's official July 1, 1940 census roll.

=== Comanche Nation ===
Beginning in 1869, annual census rolls were taken of Comanche Nation citizens. The last census roll was taken in 1939. Many of the annual Comanche Nation census rolls have been transcribed and are available in book form.

=== Hopi Tribe of Arizona ===
The Hopi Tribe of Arizona states that a person eligible for citizenship must be "one-fourth (1/4) Hopi-Tewa Indian blood or more and be a lineal descent from any Hopi-Tewa Indian person whose name appears on the 12/31/37 Hopi Basic Membership Roll."

=== Houlton Band of Maliseet Indians ===
The Houlton Band of Maliseet Indians use their base roll of October 10, 1980, to determine eligibility for tribal citizenship.

=== Laguna Pueblo ===
The Laguna Pueblo uses its 1940 census roll to determine eligibility for tribal citizenship.

=== Iroquois tribes ===
==== Seneca–Cayuga Nation ====
The Seneca–Cayuga Nation's base roll is their census roll of January 1, 1937.

==== Seneca Nation of Indians ====
The Seneca Nation of Indians conducted yearly census rolls between 1882 and 1940. Starting in 1906, these census rolls were based on New York birth certificates. The base roll of the Seneca Nation of Indians is the roll used on August 31, 1964, for the per capita distribution.

=== Mandan ===
The Mandan are enrolled citizens of the Mandan, Hidatsa, and Arikara Nation, also known as the Three Affiliated Tribes. Eligibility for tribal citizenship is determined by the tribe's base roll, the Three Affiliated Tribes Indian Census Roll of January 1, 1936.

=== Muscogee tribes ===
Muscogee people are enrolled as citizens of several federally recognized tribes, including the Muscogee Nation, Alabama–Quassarte Tribal Town, Kialegee Tribal Town, Thlopthlocco Tribal Town, Poarch Band of Creek Indians, Coushatta Tribe of Louisiana, and Alabama–Coushatta Tribe of Texas. The Muscogee Nation uses the Dawes Rolls to determine eligibility for tribal citizenship. Citizenship in the Alabama–Quassarte Tribal Town is based on lineal descent from the tribe's 1890 and 1895 rolls. The Thlopthlocco Tribal Town uses the 1890 Creek Census Roll and the 1895 Creek Payroll to determine eligibility for tribal citizenship. Eligibility for Poarch Band of Creek Indians citizenship is based on three tribal rolls: the 1870 U.S. Census of Escambia County, Alabama; the 1900 U.S. Census of Escambia County, Alabama; and the 1900 U.S. Special Indian Census of Monroe County, Alabama. Creek Indians listed on the 1870 Census for Escambia County constitute the base roll of the Poarch Band.

=== Narragansett Indian Tribe ===
Eligibility for citizenship in the Narragansett Indian Tribe is determined by descent from persons listed on the 1880-1884 Rolls, also known as the Detribalization Rolls.

=== Pascua Yaqui Tribe ===
Eligibility for citizenship in the Pascua Yaqui Tribe is determined by whether a person or their ancestor's "name appears on the original base roll dated September 18, 1980, or applied for and was approved for membership under the Open Enrollment Act of 1994, Public Law 103-357", is an American citizen, and possesses 1/4th Pascua Yaqui Indian blood.

=== Quapaw Nation ===
Eligibility for citizenship in the Quapaw Nation is determined by the tribe's citizenship roll of January 4, 1890.

=== Seminole tribes ===
There are three federally recognized Seminole tribes: the Seminole Tribe of Florida, the Miccosukee Tribe of Indians of Florida, and the Seminole Nation of Oklahoma. Enrolled citizens of the Seminole Tribe of Florida must be directly related to an individual listed on the 1957 Tribal Roll, the Base Roll of the Seminole Tribe of Florida. The tribe requires citizens to have a documented blood quantum of at least one-quarter Seminole ancestry. The Seminole Nation of Oklahoma uses the Dawes Rolls to determine tribal citizenship.

=== Shinnecock Indian Nation ===
The Shinnecock Indian Nation uses the March 18, 2010, membership list that they submitted as part of their federal petition with the Office of Federal Acknowledgment as their base roll.

=== Sioux tribes ===
There are several federally recognized Sioux tribes in the United States, including the Rosebud Sioux Tribe, the Lower Brule Sioux Tribe, the Oglala Lakota Nation, Cheyenne River Sioux Tribe, the Standing Rock Sioux Tribe, and others. Eligibility for Rosebud Sioux Tribe citizenship is determined by the tribe's official census roll of April 1, 1935. Eligibility for Lower Brule Sioux Tribe citizenship is determined by the tribe's Official Census Roll of September 2, 1958. Eligibility for Oglala Lakota Nation citizenship is determined by the tribe's official roll of April 1, 1935, and corrections to the roll made within 5 years of the adoption of the Oglala Constitution in January, 1936. Elibility for Cheyenne River Sioux Tribe citizenship is determined by the tribe's official census roll of June 18, 1934. Eligibility for citizenship in the Standing Rock Sioux Tribe is determined by the tribe's official roll of June 15, 1957.

=== Wampanoag tribes ===
There are two federally recognized Wampanoag tribes. To be eligible for citizenship in the Mashpee Wampanoag Tribe, individuals must have a direct lineal ancestor listed on the 1861 Earle Report. Citizens of the Wampanoag Tribe of Gay Head must have direct lineal descent from Wampanoag Indians listed on the 1870 census.

== See also ==
- Blood quantum laws
- Cherokee descent
- Native American genealogy
- Native American identity in the United States
- Native American recognition in the United States
- Tribal disenrollment
