= Louis Owens =

American novelist

- Born: July 18, 1948; Lompoc, California
- Died: July 25, 2002 (aged 54); Albuquerque
- Occupation: Novelist
- Awards: Josephine Miles PEN Oakland Award, 1993; Roman Noir Award, 1995; American Book Award, 1997; Writer of the Year Award, Wordcraft Circle of Native Writers & Storytellers, 1998

Louis Dean Owens (July 18, 1948 - July 25, 2002) was a novelist and scholar who claimed Choctaw, Cherokee, and Irish-American descent. He is known for a series of Native-themed mystery novels and for his contributions to the then-fledgling field of Native American Studies. He was also a professor of English and Native American studies, and frequently contributed articles, literary criticism and reviews to periodicals. Owens died by suicide in 2002.

== Biography ==
Louis Owens was born in Lompoc, CA on July 18, 1948. He was one of nine children born to Hoey and Ida Owens. He self-identified as being of Choctaw and Cherokee descent. Despite not being a citizen in any Native nation, or naming any tribal ancestors or relatives, and writing that "I'm not enrolled and did not grow up on a reservation", he still identified as Native American. He grew up in rural Mississippi and California. His first job, at the age of nine, was picking beans. From 1969 - 1974 Owens worked as a forest ranger and firefighter for the United States Forest Service in Washington State. He received his B.A. and M.A. from the University of California, Santa Barbara and his Ph.D. in 1981 from the University of California, Davis. Owens taught at the University of California, Davis and at University of California, Santa Cruz, California State University at Northridge, and the University of New Mexico. Owens wrote five novels in total, often featuring the relationship of Native Americans and contemporary American society, and exploring identity and mixed ancestries. He had reputation for combining thriller plots with more universal themes. He also completed five collections of essays and literary criticism and was one of the leading American scholars on Native American fiction. Owens was also considered an expert on John Steinbeck's work.

Owens was a member of the editorial board of the Steinbeck Quarterly. He was also on the editorial board of New America, associate editor of American Literary Realism, and co-editor of American Literary Scholarship: An Annual, 1990. He was a member of the national committee for the Native American Literature Award and the Native American Prose Award, a member of the governing board of the Native American International Prize in Literature and a nominator for the National Medal of Arts. He had also been a member of the advisory board of the Southwest Indian Polytechnic Institute. He contributed more than a hundred articles and reviews to periodicals, including Northeast Indian Quarterly, Arizona Quarterly, San Jose Studies, American Indian Quarterly, and USA Today.

Owens died of a self-inflicted gunshot wound on July 26, 2002, in Albuquerque. He was survived by his wife and two daughters. At the time of his death, he was professor of English and Native American studies, and the director of creative writing at the University of California, Davis.

== Awards ==
Owens was named Writer of the Year Award from Wordcraft Circle of Native Writers & Storytellers for Mixedblood Messages in 1998. He received the American Book Award for Nightland in 1997.

The books The Sharpest Sight and Other Destinies were co-winners of the Josephine Miles, PEN Oakland Award for 1993 and The Sharpest Sight won the 1995 Roman Noir Award, France's equivalent of the Edgar Award. Bone Game was selected by an independent panel of judges as the winner of the Julian J. Rothbaum Prize for the best book published by the University of Oklahoma Press in 1994.

Owens was a Fulbright lecturer in American literature at the University of Pisa, Italy (1980–1). He was awarded a National Endowment for the Arts Creative Writing Fellowship in 1989 and a National Endowment for the Humanities Fellowship in 1987. He also received a New Mexico Humanities Grant (1987) and been named Outstanding Teacher of the Year by the International Steinbeck Society in 1985-6 and received the Distinguished Teaching Award at the University of California, Santa Cruz in 1992.

== Novels ==
- Wolfsong. Norman: University of Oklahoma Press, 1995.
- The Sharpest Sight. Norman: University of Oklahoma Press, 1995.
- Bone Game. Norman: University of Oklahoma Press, 1996.
- Nightland. Dutton, 1996. (Winner of an American Book Award).
- Dark River. Norman: University of Oklahoma Press, 1999.

== Anthologies and Literary Criticism ==
- Jacquelyn Kilpatrick, "Louis Owens: literary reflections on his life and work," University of Oklahoma Press, 2004
- "I Hear the Train: Reflections, Inventions, Refractions," (American Indian Literature and Critical Studies Series, v. 39) University of Oklahoma Press.
- "Mixed Blood Messages: Literature, Film, Family, Place," (American Indian Literature and Critical Studies Series, v. 26) University of Oklahoma Press.
- "Gerald Vizenor," a special issue of SAIL, V 9, No. 1, Spring 1997.
- Other Destinies, (American Indian Literature and Critical Studies Series, v.3) University of Oklahoma Press.
- The Grapes of Wrath: Trouble in the Promised Land, Twayne Pub.
- John Steinbeck's Re-Vision of America, University of Georgia Press.
- American Indian Novelists : An Annotated Critical Bibliography, with Tom Colonnese, Garland Reference Library of the Humanities, Vol 384, Garland Press.
- American Literary Scholarship : An Annual, 1990, as Editor, Duke Univ Press.

== Interviews & Essays ==
"Grave Concerns Trickster Turns: The Novels of Louis Owens," Chris LaLonde, Univ. Oklahoma Press. (American Indian Literature and Critical Studies Series, v. 43). Special Issue of SAIL on Louis Owens edited by Chris LaLonde, v. 10, no. 2, Summer 1998, containing:

- Preface by Chris LaLonde;
- Clear Waters: A Conversation with Louis Owens by John Purdy;
- Bone Game's Terminal Plots and Healing Stories by Rochelle Venuto;
- The Syncretic Impulse: Louis Owens' Use of Autobiography, Ethnology, and Blended Mythologies in The Sharpest Sight by Margaret Dwyer;
- Nightland and the Mythic West by Linda Lizut Helstern;
- Wilderness Conditions: Ranging for Place and Identity in Louis Owens' Wolfsong by Susan Bernardin;
- Landscape and Cultural Identity in Louis Owens' Wolfsong by Lee Schweninger.

That the People Might Live: Native American Literatures and Native American Community, Jace Weaver, Oxford University Press.

Mixedbloods and Mystery: Crises of Identity in Two Native American Novels, Amy Lerman, Kishwaukee College, in Publication of the Illinois Philological Association.

Everything Matters : Autobiographical Essays by Native American Writers, Arnold Krupat & Brian Swann (Editors), Random House.

Native North American Literature: Biographical and Critical Information on Native Writers and Orators from the United States and Canada, Janet Witalec, Jeffery Chapman (Editors), Gale Research.

== Writing Online ==
Finding Gene in Weber Studies The Song Is Very Short": Native American Literature and Literary Theory in Weber Studies

== See also ==
- A short biography is available from the Internet Public Library's Native American Author's Project.
- In Memoriam, UC Santa Cruz News Service
- Suicide/ The Aftermath, Glen Martin, San Francisco Chronicle.
