= 1896 Applications for Enrollment, Five Tribes (Overturned) =

The 1896 Applications for Enrollment, Five Tribes (Overturned) were applications in 1896 for citizenship in the Five Tribes: the Cherokee, Chickasaw, Choctaw, Muscogee (Creek), and Seminole. Authorized by the Dawes Commission, the applications were disputed by the Five Tribes as fraudulent and ultimately overturned by the Department of the Interior. The overturned 1896 applications have been digitized and are available online on multiple websites, including Ancestry.com and the Oklahoma Historical Society.

== About ==
The Dawes Commission authorized applications for tribal enrollment in the Five Tribes on March 3, 1893, in an attempt to convince the tribes to cede Indian lands to the federal government. The 1896 Applications for Enrollment were commissioned at the insistence of the Dawes Commission, not at the insistence of the Five Tribes themselves. Some of the families and individuals who applied were enrolled by US federal courts, which had no jurisdiction to determine tribal citizenship. This resulted in the inclusion of many non-American Indian individuals, who were fraudulent intruders within the tribes. The Five Tribes rejected the authority of federal courts in Indian Territory and fought against the tribal enrollment of these individuals. Following lengthy deliberations, the Secretary of the Interior sided with the Five Tribes and the 1896 Applications for Enrollment were overturned. Although the applications were rejected due to inaccurate data, the rejected applicants were not given individual notification that their applications had been rejected.

Because the 1896 applications were ruled invalid, the Dawes Commission started all over again two years later with new tribal rolls called the Dawes Rolls. The rolls were primarily created between 1898 and 1907, with a small number of applicants approved in 1914. The Dawes Rolls were authorized by the Curtis Act of 1898. If rejected applicants from 1896 still desired tribal citizenship, they had to apply again on the Dawes Rolls.

Digitized records relating to the overturned 1896 applications are available on multiple websites, including Ancestry.com and the Oklahoma Historical Society. Prior to the digitization of the rejected applications, they were available on microfilm at the National Archives and Records Administration via the microfilm publication M1650.

== See also ==
- Baker Roll
- Cherokee descent
- Dawes Commission
- Dawes Rolls
- Guion Miller Roll
- Indigenous identity fraud in Canada and the United States
- Native American tribal rolls
