= Kim TallBear =

Sisseton Wahpeton Oyate scholar (born 1968)

- TallBear in 2026
- Born: 1968 (age 57–58); Pipestone, Minnesota, Minnesota, U.S.
- Citizenship: Sisseton Wahpeton Oyate and U.S.
- Title: Canada Research Chair in Indigenous Peoples, Technoscience and Environment

Academic background
- Education: University of Massachusetts at Boston, Massachusetts Institute of Technology, University of California, Santa Cruz, Texas Christian University
- Doctoral advisor: Donna Haraway

Academic work
- Discipline: Indigenous studies, Anthropology
- Institutions: University of Alberta
- Website: kimtallbear.com

Kim TallBear (born 1968) is a Sisseton Wahpeton Oyate professor at the University of Minnesota – Twin Cities, specializing in racial politics in science. Holding the first ever Canada Research Chair in Indigenous Peoples, Technoscience and Environment, TallBear has published on DNA testing, race science and Indigenous identities, as well as on polyamory as a decolonization practice.

== Early life ==
TallBear was born in 1968 at a public hospital in Pipestone, Minnesota. She grew up moving back and forth between the Sisseton and Flandreau reservations in South Dakota. During this time, she was mostly raised by her maternal grandmother and great-grandmother, until the age of fourteen when she went to live full time with her mother in St. Paul, Minnesota.

TallBear is a citizen of the Sisseton-Wahpeton Oyate in South Dakota, as well as a descendant of the Cheyenne and Arapaho tribes of Oklahoma through her maternal grandfather. Her Indigenous descent comes from her mother's side. She also has some Cree and Métis ancestry from Canada. Her father, who was only present in her life up to age three, is white. TallBear has two sisters and one brother, whose father is Floyd Westerman, a Dakota Sioux musician, actor and political activist.

TallBear's household growing up was a politically active environment and TallBear says her mother in particular helped to shape her understanding of research and academic thought as being a part of a colonial project. Nevertheless her mother also emphasized thinking practically about education, viewing it as the only way out of poverty.

== Education and career ==
TallBear pursued post-secondary education for the first two years at the Texas Christian University in Texas then later switched to the University of Massachusetts in Boston to obtain an undergraduate degree in community planning. She then completed her master's degree in environmental planning at Massachusetts Institute of Technology.

After graduating, TallBear worked for 10 years as an environmental planner for United States federal agencies, tribal governments, and national tribal organizations. She later worked for a non-governmental, Indigenous environmental research organization in Denver. This organization started holding workshops that researched the implications of mapping of the human genome and the genetic research on Indigenous peoples. It was through this workshop that TallBear found a desire to continue her education, and subsequently completed her PhD at the University of California, Santa Cruz in History of Consciousness in 2005.

In 2010, TallBear was elected to be a member of the Council of the Native American and Indigenous Studies Association (NAISA), and served in the position until 2013. In late 2016, she became the first ever Canada Research Chair in Indigenous Peoples, Technoscience and Environment. As she is an anthropologist specializing in the cultural intersection of science and technology, TallBear is a frequent media commentator on issues of Tribal membership, genetics and identity.

She has taught in the Native Studies department of the University of Alberta since 2014, and has been a full professor since 2020.

== Areas of study ==
=== DNA and Indigenous identities ===
TallBear's first book, Native American DNA: Tribal Belonging and the False Promise of Genetic Science, was released in 2013 by the University of Minnesota Press. Described as a "provocative and incisive work of interdisciplinary scholarship", the book examines the science of hereditary genetics and the problematic consequences for Indigenous identities. Specifically, TallBear's critique focuses on the ways the language employed by genetic scientists—and its subsequent marketing of DNA testing—can reduce what it means to be Indigenous to genetically determined characteristics. TallBear’s research shows how this often relies on traditions of scientific racism historically directed at Indigenous populations. The assertion of genetic determinism, TallBear argues, is often at odds with generations of cultural traditions Indigenous communities have used to collectively self-identify—traditions that focus on relationships, and shared value systems negotiated by social relations.

TallBear's work documents Indigenous communities across a diverse range of contexts in order to demonstrate the ways Indigenous identities are muted and amplified to the advantage of settler populations. In defending the ethics of Indigenous jurisdiction over their own identities, TallBear argues Indigenous peoples know their history better than settlers. In light of this, TallBear has drawn attention to the problems of the settler scientific community attempting to direct the boundaries of Indigenous identities. TallBear points to the history of the scientific community negatively impacting Indigenous communities as a reason for researchers to approach issues of Indigenous identity with deep care and respect for these histories. TallBear has criticized researchers who do not invest considerable time in building relationships with the Indigenous populations with which they wish to study. For TallBear, the need for embedded research stems from the important role cultural practices and specific relational contexts play in shaping Indigenous identity.

==== Critiques of Elizabeth Warren's claims to Indigenous ancestry ====
In 2018, Senator Elizabeth Warren released the results of a DNA test to prove her claim to Cherokee Native American ancestry. This raised many questions surrounding how one can claim Native American ancestry and who can decide if these claims are true or false.

In Native American DNA: Tribal Belonging and the False Promise of Genetic Science, TallBear argues that genetic testing is a scientifically unreliable method. Since much of her work coincides with much of this situation, TallBear published a post to her Twitter in 2018 titled "Statement on Elizabeth Warren's DNA Test". In the statement, she claims the situation ultimately as settler-colonial definitions of who is Indigenous.

TallBear and Cherokee Nation citizens have defended their arguments by explaining how tribal governments do not use genetic ancestry tests, instead using forms of biological and political relationships to define their citizenries. Despite Cherokee Nation citizens' challenging Warren’s claims, and TallBear's academic research and work on the subject, Warren initially defended her ancestry claims. She later apologized.

=== "The Critical Polyamorist" and decolonizing relationships ===
In her later work, TallBear is focused on sexuality, specifically on decolonizing the valourization of monogamy that she characterizes as emblematic of "settler sexualities". She pursued this topic of study through a blog written under an alter ego, "The Critical Polyamorist". TallBear was part of a panel discussing decolonizing institutions such as relationships, at the National Women's Studies Association meeting in 2016.

TallBear's critiques of monogamous, heteronormative colonial relations focus on their incompatibility with an environmentally sustainable world. For TallBear, moving beyond the current environmental problems of the neoliberal nation state requires expanding understandings and practices of kinship. She argues Indigenous conceptions of kin provide opportunities for this transition. TallBear's critical polyamory places emphasis on looking beyond human-centric intimacy to also incorporate relational ways of being with place and other non-human dimensions to relationships. TallBear's focus on kin goes to the "decolonization" of intimacy: relationships outside of what she describes as settler-colonial relationship structures.

== Selected works ==
=== Articles ===
- "Dossier: Theorizing Queer Inhumanisms: An Indigenous Reflection on Working Beyond the Human/Not Human" in GLQ: A Journal of Lesbian and Gay Studies, Vol. 21(2–3), 2015: 230–235.
- "The Emergence, Politics, and Marketplace of Native American DNA" in The Routledge Handbook of Science, Technology, and Society, eds. Daniel Lee Kleinman and Kelly Moore. London: Routledge, 2014: 21–37.
- "Tribal Housing, Co-Design & Cultural Sovereignty" in Edmunds, David S., Ryan Shelby, Angela James, Lenora Steele, Michelle Baker, Yael Valerie Perez, and Kim TallBear Science, Technology, & Human Values 38 (6) (2013): 801–828.
- "Genomic Articulations of Indigeneity" in Social Studies of Science 43(4) (August 2013): 509–534.
- "Your DNA is Our History." Genomics, Anthropology, and the Construction of Whiteness as Property," co-authored with Jenny Reardon in Current Anthropology 53(S12) (April 2012): S233–S245.
- "The Illusive Gold Standard in Genetic Ancestry Testing," co-authored with Lee, S. S-J., D. Bolnick, T. Duster, P. Ossorio in Science 325 (5943) (July 3, 2009): 38–39.
- "Commentary" (on Decoding Implications of the Genographic Project for Archaeology and Cultural Heritage)" in International Journal of Cultural Property 16 (2009): 189–192
- "The Science and Business of Genetic Ancestry," co-authored with Bolnick, Deborah A., Duana Fullwiley, Troy Duster, Richard S. Cooper, Joan H. Fujimura, Jonathan Kahn, Jay Kaufman, Jonathan Marks, Ann Morning, Alondra Nelson, Pilar Ossorio, Jenny Reardon, and Susan M. Reverby in Science, 318(5849) (October 19, 2007): 399–400
- "Narratives of Race and Indigeneity in the Genographic Project" in Journal of Law, Medicine & Ethics, Vol. 35(3) (Fall 2007): 412–424.

=== Books ===
- "Beyond the Life/Not Life Binary: A Feminist-Indigenous Reading of Cryopreservation, Interspecies Thinking and the New Materialisms." in Joanna Radin and Emma Kowal's edited Cryopolitics, published 2017 by MIT Press
- "Dear Indigenous Studies, It's Not Me, It's You. Why I Left and What Needs to Change." in Aileen Moreton-Robinson's edited Critical Indigenous Studies: Engagements in First World Locations, published 2016 by Tucson: University of Arizona Press, 2016: 69–82
- Native American DNA: Tribal Belonging and the False Promise of Genetic Science, published 2013 by Minneapolis: University of Minnesota Press
- “DNA, Blood and Racializing the Tribe,” in Jayne O. Ifekwunige's ‘Mixed Race’ Studies: A Reader, published 2003 in Wicazo Sá Review Vol. 18(1) (2003): 81–107, then in 2004 by London and New York: Routledge
