= Daniel Munduruku =

Brazilian writer and educator

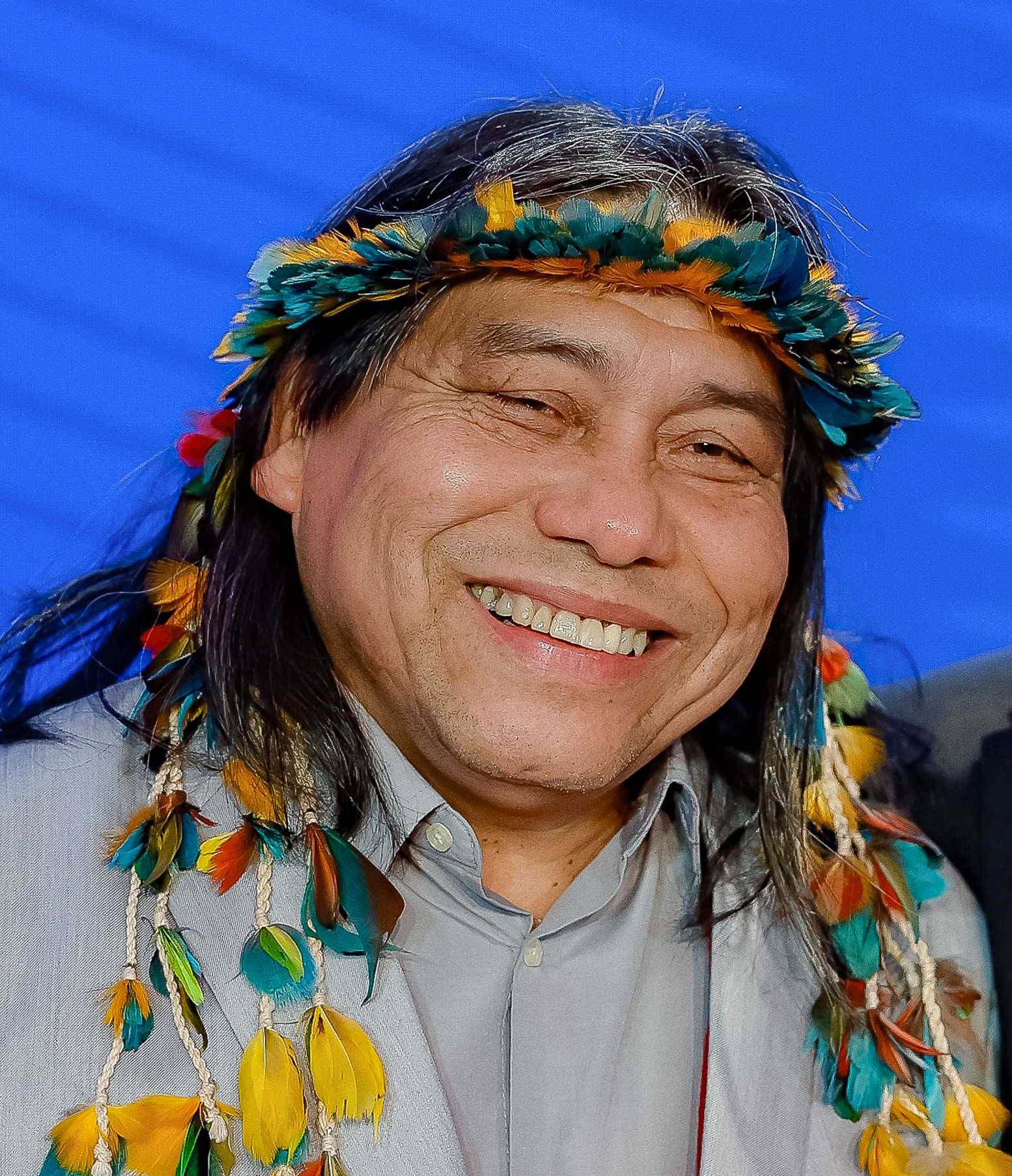
Munduruku in May 2025

Daniel Munduruku (Belém do Pará, February 28, 1964) is a Brazilian writer and educator. He is member of the Munduruku indigenous people. His children's books deal about traditional indigenous life and tales and have been awarded several prizes. Munduruku holds three undergraduate degrees in philosophy, History and Psychology. He has a master's degree in Social Anthropology and a doctorate in education by the University of São Paulo.

Besides being a writer, he worked as a teacher and is involved in many organizations that strive for the culture and literature of the indigenous people of Brazil. Munduruku is president of the Instituto Indígena Brasileiro da Propriedade Intellectual (Brazilian Indigenous Institute of Intellectual Property), director of the Instituto Uk'a – A Casa dos Saberes Ancestrais (Uk'a Institute – The House of Ancient Knowledge) and president of the Academy of Letters of Lorena. He is managing director of the Museu do Índio of Rio de Janeiro.

== Works ==
- A primeira estrela que vejo é an estrela do meu desejo e outras histórias indígenas de amor
- Você lembra, pai?, Global Editora, 2005, ISBN 9788526008052
- Sabedoria das águas, Global Editora, 2004 ISBN 9788526008946
- Contos indígenas brasileiros, Global Editora, 2005 ISBN 9788526009363
- Parece que foi ontem
- Outras tantas histórias indígenas de origem das coisas e do universo, Global Editora, 2008 ISBN 9788526012561
- A caveira-rolante, a mulher-lesma e outras histórias indígenas de assustar, Global Editora, ISBN 8526013890
- O banquete dos deuses, 2000, Editora Angra, ISBN 8585969156
- A velha árvore, Editora Salesiana, 2002, ISBN 9788575470411
- As peripécias do jabuti, Mercuryo Jovem, 2007, ISBN 9788572722285
- As serpentes que roubaram a noite, 2001, Peiropolis, ISBN 8585663588
- Caçadores de aventuras, CARAMELO, ISBN 9788573404692
- Catando piolhos contando histórias, Brinque-Book, 2006 ISBN 9788574121451
- Coisas de índio, 2000, Callis Editora,
- Crônicas de São Paulo, Callis Editora Limited, 2011, ISBN 9788574166087
- O diário de Kaxi, Editora Salesiana, 2001, ISBN 9788587997579
- Um estranho sonho de futuro, FTD, 2004, ISBN 9788532252234
- Os filhos do sangue do céu, Landy Editora, 2005
- Histórias de índio, Companhia das Letrinhas, 1997
- Histórias que eu ouvi e gosto de contar, 2004, Callis Editora Ltd, ISBN 8574162264
- Histórias que eu vivi e gosto de contar, Callis Editora Ltd.
- Kabá Darebü
- Meu vô Apolinário, 2001, Studio Nobel, ISBN 8585445955
- O homem que roubava horas
- O olho bom do menino, Brinque-Book, 2007 ISBN 9788574122090
- O onça
- O segredo da chuva, Ed. Ática, 2006, ISBN 9788508087440
- O sinal do pajé, 2003, Peiropolis, ISBN 8575960067
- O sumiço da noite, 2006, Caramelo, ISBN 8573405058
- Parece que foi ontem
- Sobre piolhos e outros afagos
- Tempo de histórias, Ed. Moderna, 2005, ISBN 9788516047627
- O sonho que não parecia sonho, Caramelo livros educativos, 2007, ISBN 9788573405231
- Uma aventura na Amazônia, Caramelo, ISBN 9788573405781

Books published in English

- Amazonia-Indigenous Tales from Brazil, 2013, Groundwood Books, ISBN 9781554981854
- Tales of the Amazon-How the Munduruku Indians Live, 2000, Groundwood Books, ISBN 978-0-88899-392-2

== Awards ==
- Honorable Mention in the UNESCO Prize for Children's and Young People's Literature in the Service of Tolerance (2003)
- Prêmio Jabuti de Literatura (Jabuti Literature Prize)(2004).
- Prize of the National Foundation for Children and Young People's Books Fundação Nacional para o Livro Infantil e Juvenil (FNLIJ) (2005)
- Prize of the Academia Brasileira de Letras (Brazilian Academy of Literature)
- Érico Vannucci Mendes Prize, of the Conselho Nacional de Desenvolvimento Científico e Tecnológico (National Council for Scientific and Technological Development)
