= Índia pega no laço =

Phrase in Brazil that translates to "an Indian woman caught by the lasso"

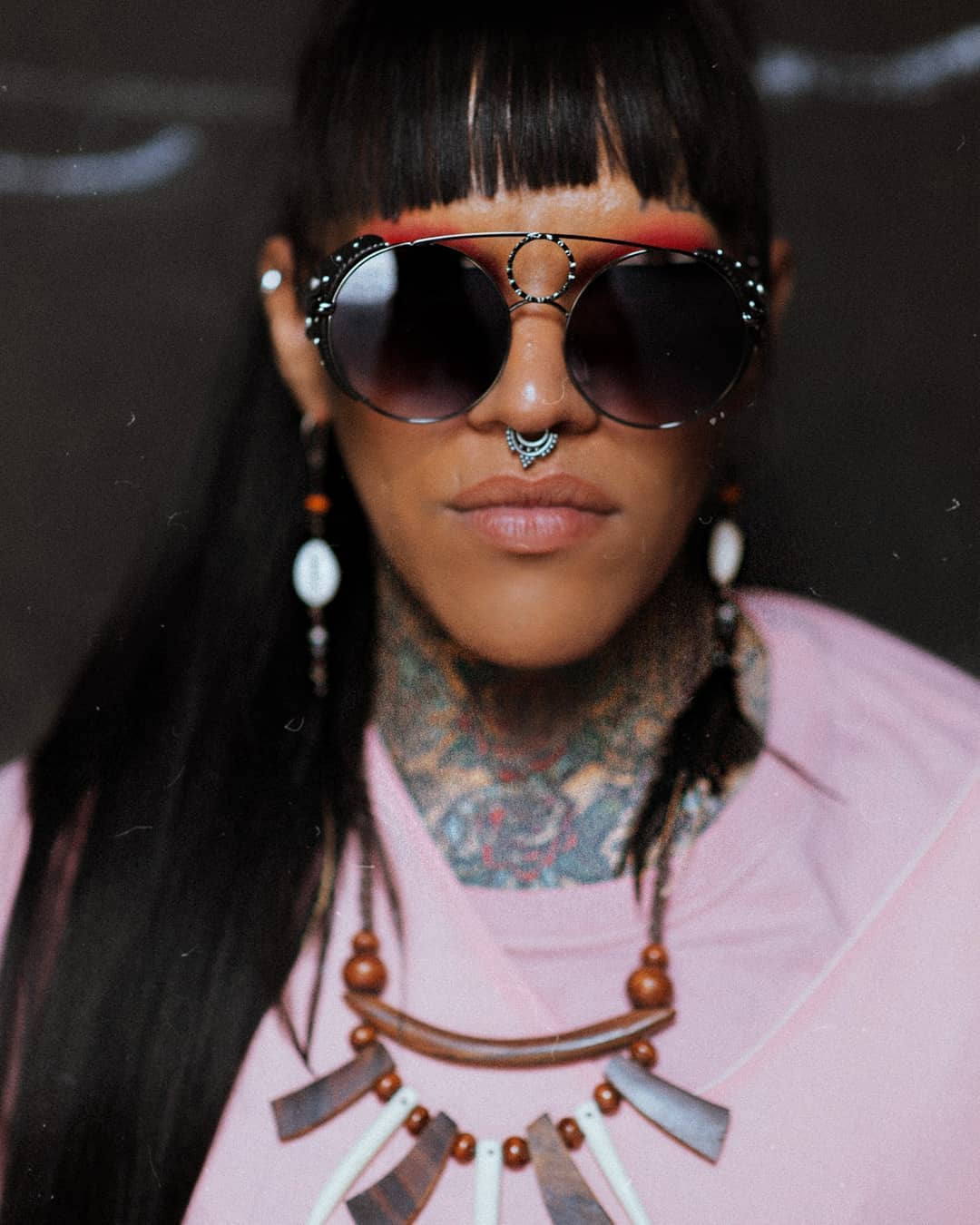
Rapper Katú Mirim is among many Indigenous Brazilians who have discussed the phrase: "People say 'I have a grandmother who was pega no laço' and I say, 'So? Do you know the name of your people? What memory do you look for in your ancestry?'"

Índia pega no laço is a phrase used in Brazil that translates to "an Indian woman caught by the lasso". The phrase is used by non-Indigenous Brazilians who claim they have an Indigenous female ancestor and is a reference to the male settlers of Brazil allegedly using lassos to capture Indigenous women.

The phrase is particularly used in the South and South-East of Brazil; the phrases "pega a dente de cachorro" (caught in the teeth of a dog) or "pega a casco de cavalo" (horseback) are also used to the same effect in the North, North-East and Centre-West of Brazil.

The phrase has been discussed particularly by Brazilian anthropologists, as well as by Indigenous people themselves. It is regarded as racist and misogynistic, because it is often used to romanticise or make a joke of the supposed abduction and rape of an Indigenous ancestor.

== Critiques of the phrase ==
=== Historicity ===
The trope of the captured Indigenous (great, great-great) grandmother is a standard origin myth for many Brazilian families but also reflects "in part" the reality of the origins of Brazil's ethnically mixed population. For example, in a paper discussing the phrase, Indigenous academic Mirna P Marinho da Silva Anaquiri reports a quote from a teacher in Goiânia interviewed as part of her fieldwork:

As a child I witnessed an Indian woman arriving at the farm where my father worked, tied to the tail of a horse. The guy riding on the horse, and her, tied with a rope to the horse's tail; this—for me—is that image. And this "pega no laço" [caught in the lasso] is so generalized that it seems common, natural—nobody is shocked.... ..They... locked her in this wooden box.. ..This happened in 1961, I was four years old.

— A teacher in Goianápolis, reported in Anaquiri, 2018

Recent genetic analysis has found that a high proportion of white Brazilians, at least one third, are descended from Indigenous women on the maternal line. Though geneticists found this high level of Indigenous maternal ancestry surprising at first, anthropologist Suelen Siqueira Julio argues that is it "echoed" in the stories of the ancestor who was "pega no laço".

=== Identity ===
Anthropologist Julie A Cavignac describes how Brazilian families repeat the same story, down the generations: of an Indigenous young woman, kidnapped by a white man, taken far from her in home (in the forest or on the sierra), kept isolated from the rest of the family until she is "tamed" by having children. The image of the wild Indian woman merges with the representation of the natural world—the feminine world corresponding to the primordial time of the Indigenous ascendancy.

Alcida Rita Ramos believes that claiming a distant Indigenous ancestor is a way of claiming an authentic Brazilian identity:

The man in the street may often say that his Indian grandmother was caught with a lasso, by which he means to authenticate his Brazilianness with a metonymic bond with the proverbial "first inhabitants of the land."

— Alcida Rita Ramos

Ramos observes that the claim to "Indian blood" is "somewhat of an abstraction with no material cost"; she writes, "The Indian grandmother is like an ornament that one wears one day and puts away the next." Ramos argues that in the Brazilian national imagination, a "good Indian" is one who remotely contributed her blood to the soil of the Brazilian nation but who is far removed from modern day life.

=== Normalising violence against women ===
Many other commentators have criticised the phrase as normalizing and trivializing rape and violence against Indigenous women. For example, the Indigenous Brazilian writer and educator Daniel Munduruku, a member of the Munduruku people, has written that it is bizarre for non-Indigenous Brazilians to be proud that their great-grandfather supposedly had raped and enslaved their great-grandmother and forced her to bear unwanted children and make jokes about the pain and suffering she endured. Other critics analyse the violence implicit in the phrase as reflecting an ongoing culture of violence against women, Indigenous and non-Indigenous. For example, Purí commentator, Raial Orutu Puri in a Ted X talk entitled My grandmother was "pega no laço" moves from discussing the violence against her female ancestors, to the violence against her nation, to the violence committed against all Indigenous women and nations, and from there to contemporary violence against women in Brazil. Similarly, in her paper about the phrase, academic Mirna P Marinho da Silva Anaquiri discusses the availability in Brazil of car bumper stickers showing a cowboy lassoing women. She writes:

What is behind, or even at the forefront, of this image is the discourse of rape culture, the implication of taking or roping a woman by force, without consent, reaffirming the place of the man as the owner of the woman's body.

— Mirna P Marinho da Silva Anaquiri

== See also ==
- Indian princess
- Indigenismo
  - Indigenismo in Mexico
  - Indigenismo in the United States
- Indigenous peoples in Brazil
- La Malinche
- Pardo Brazilians
- Race and ethnicity in Brazil
- Rape culture
- Sexual victimization of Native American women
- White Brazilians
