= Native American identity in the United States =

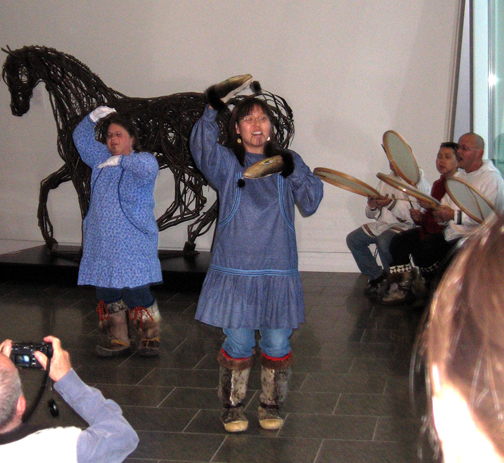
Alaska Native dancers at the University of Alaska, Fairbanks Art Museum, 2006

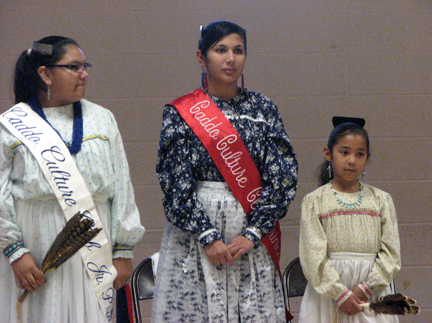
Caddo members of the Caddo Cultural Club, Binger, Oklahoma, 2008

Native American identity in the United States is a community identity, determined by the tribal nation the individual or group belongs to. While it is common for non-Natives to consider it a racial or ethnic identity, for Native Americans in the United States it is considered a political identity, based on citizenship and immediate family relationships. As culture can vary widely between the 575 extant federally recognized tribes in the United States, the idea of a single unified "Native American" racial identity is a European construct that does not have an equivalent in tribal thought.

While some groups and individuals self-identify as Native American, self-identification on its own does not make one eligible for membership among recognized tribes. There are a number of different factors which have been used by non-Natives to define "Indianness", and the source and potential use of the definition play a role in what definitions have been used in their writings, including culture, society, genes/biology, law, and self-identity. Peroff asks whether the definition should be dynamic and changeable across time and situation, or whether it is possible to define "Indianness" in a static way, based in how Indians adapt and adjust to dominant society, which may be called an "oppositional process" by which the boundaries between Indians and the dominant groups are maintained. Another reason for dynamic definitions is the process of "ethnogenesis", which is the process by which the ethnic identity of the group is developed and renewed as social organizations and cultures evolve. The question of identity, especially Indigenous identity, is common in many societies worldwide.

== Factors and terminology ==
Preferred terminology for Indigenous peoples of the Americas, Native Americans in the United States, or Indigenous Canadians as a whole varies regionally, as well as by age and other sociological factors. Most individuals prefer to be known as citizens or descendants of the exact tribes/nations they are from. As for general, overarching terms, the United States Census Bureau defines Native American as "all people indigenous [sic] to the United States and its territories—including Native Hawaiian and Other Pacific Islanders—whose data are published separately from American Indians and Alaska Natives".

The use of Native American or native American to refer to Indigenous peoples who live in the Americas came into widespread, common use during the civil rights era of the 1960s and 1970s. This term was considered to represent historical fact more accurately (i.e., "Native" cultures predated European colonization). In addition, activists also believed it was free of negative historical connotations that had come to be associated with previous terms. However, not all Native people accepted the change. In 1968, the American Indian Movement (AIM) was founded in the United States. In 1977, a delegation from the International Indian Treaty Council, an arm of AIM, elected to collectively identify as "American Indian", at the United Nations Conference on Indians in the Americas in Geneva, Switzerland.

Some Indigenous activists and public figures, particularly those from the Plains nations, such as Russell Means (Oglala Lakota), have preferred "Indian" to the more recently adopted "Native American". Means spoke frequently of his fear of the loss of traditions, languages, and sacred places. He was concerned that there may soon be no more Native Americans, only "Native American Americans, like Polish Americans and Italian Americans." As the number of self-reported "Indians" has grown (ten times as many today as in 1890), the number who carry on tribal traditions has reportedly shrunk (one fifth as many as in 1890), as has been common among many cultural groups over time. Means said, "We might speak our language, we might look like Indians and sound like Indians, but we won’t be Indians."

Between 1982 and 1993, most American manuals of style came to agree that "color terms" referring to ethnic groups, such as Black, should be capitalized as proper names, as well as Native American. By 2020, "Indigenous" was also included in these capitalization guidelines.

During the late 20th century the term "Indigenous peoples" evolved into a political term that refers to ethnic groups with historical ties to groups that existed in a territory prior to colonization or formation of a nation state. The "I" is capitalized as it refers to a group of people. In the Americas, the term "Indigenous peoples of the Americas" was adopted, and the term is tailored to specific geographic or political regions, such as "Indigenous peoples of Panama". "'Indigenous peoples' ... is a term that internationalizes the experiences, the issues and the struggles of some of the world's colonized peoples", writes Māori educator Linda Tuhiwai Smith. "The final 's' in 'Indigenous peoples' ... [is] a way of recognizing that there are real differences between different Indigenous peoples." Many younger Native Americans now prefer "Indigenous" as a unifying term, over previous options.

=== Blood quantum or lineal descent ===
Some tribes have a blood quantum requirement for citizenship. Others use other methods, such as lineal descent. While almost two-thirds of all federally recognized Indian tribes in the United States require a certain blood quantum for citizenship, tribal nations are sovereign nations, with a government to government relationship with the United States, and set their own enrollment criteria. The Indian Reorganization Act of 1934 used three criteria: tribal membership, ancestral descent, and blood quantum (one half).

=== Traditional ===
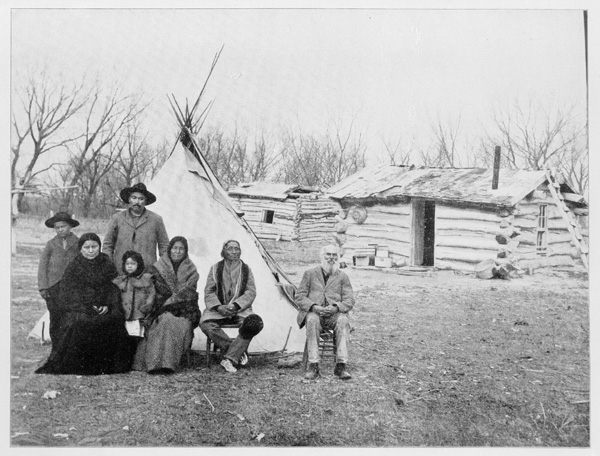
Reservation life has often been a blend of the traditional and the contemporary. In 1877, this Lakota family living at South Dakota's Rose Bud Agency had both tipis and log cabins.

While traditional definitions of Native American identity can vary between Native communities, such definitions usually refer to those who observe, preserve, and teach about the community's ancestral language, culture and ceremonies, and who protect and maintain the community's sacred sites and inherited landbase. The term is defined by Indigenous cultural standards, rather than mainstream academic and legal terminology. Language preservation in particular, and doing one's part to preserve the Native language of one's community, especially for young people, is seen as contributing to cultural survival, and is an important part of being "traditional". Those who maintain Native American traditions are often referred to as "traditional" or "traditionals".

Some Indian artists find traditional definitions especially important. Crow poet Henry Real Bird offers his own definition, "An Indian is one who offers tobacco to the ground, feeds the water, and prays to the four winds in his own language." Pulitzer Prize-winning Kiowa author N. Scott Momaday gives a definition that is less spiritual but still based in the traditions and experience of a person and their family, "An Indian is someone who thinks of themselves as an Indian. But that's not so easy to do and one has to earn the entitlement somehow. You have to have a certain experience of the world in order to formulate this idea. I consider myself an Indian; I've had the experience of an Indian. I know how my father saw the world, and his father before him."

=== Connection to ancestral landbase ===
Indian reservations

The preservation and revitalization of language, cultural and ceremonial traditions is often seen as central to Native American identity. While these ways are also maintained by urban Indians and those who live in other Native communities, residence on tribal lands is often seen as important as well, with even those who are not permanent residents returning to their homelands for ceremonies and family functions. Many Native American elders live on their ancestral land bases, which may be Indian reservations, reserves or land allotments, and may work in cultural centers in their communities. The Land Back movement, and other Native American civil rights organizations, prioritizes the protection and preservation of sacred sites, as well as the landbase that provides traditional foods, housing and cultural meaning to the people. Many Native Americans feel the connection to ancestral lands is an important part of identity.

=== Construction by others ===
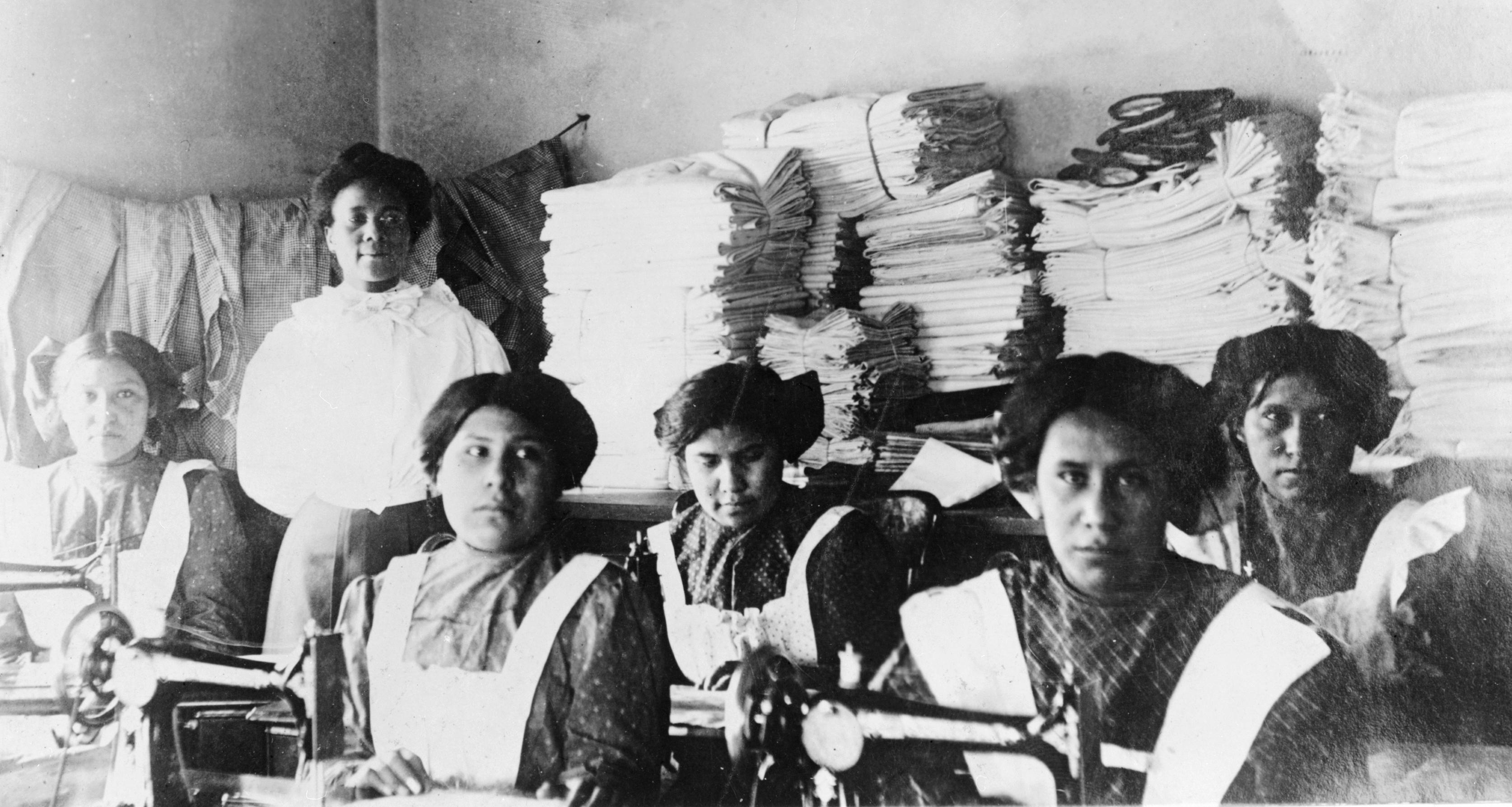
Students at the Bismarck Indian School in the early twentieth century.

European and settler conceptions of "Indianness" have influenced how some Native Americans see themselves, and have created persistent stereotypes which may negatively affect treatment of Indians. The noble savage stereotype is famous, but American colonists held other stereotypes as well. For example, some colonists imagined Indians as living in a state similar to their own ancestors, for example the Picts, Gauls, and Britons before "Julius Caesar with his Roman legions (or some other) had ... laid the ground to make us tame and civil".

In the 19th and 20th century, particularly until John Collier's tenure as Commissioner of Indian Affairs began in 1933, various policies of the United States federal and state governments amounted to an attack on Indian cultural identity and an attempt to force assimilation. These policies included but were not limited to the banning of traditional religious ceremonies; forcing traditional hunter-gatherer people to begin farming, often on land that was unsuitable and produced few or no crops; forced cutting of hair; coercing "conversion" to Christianity by withholding rations; coercing Indian parents to send their children to boarding schools where the use of Native American languages was met with violence and where many children died under suspicious circumstances; freedom of speech restrictions; and restriction on travel between reservations. In the Southwest sections of the U.S. under Spanish control until 1810, where the majority (80%) of inhabitants were Indigenous, Spanish government officials had similar policies.

=== United States government definitions ===
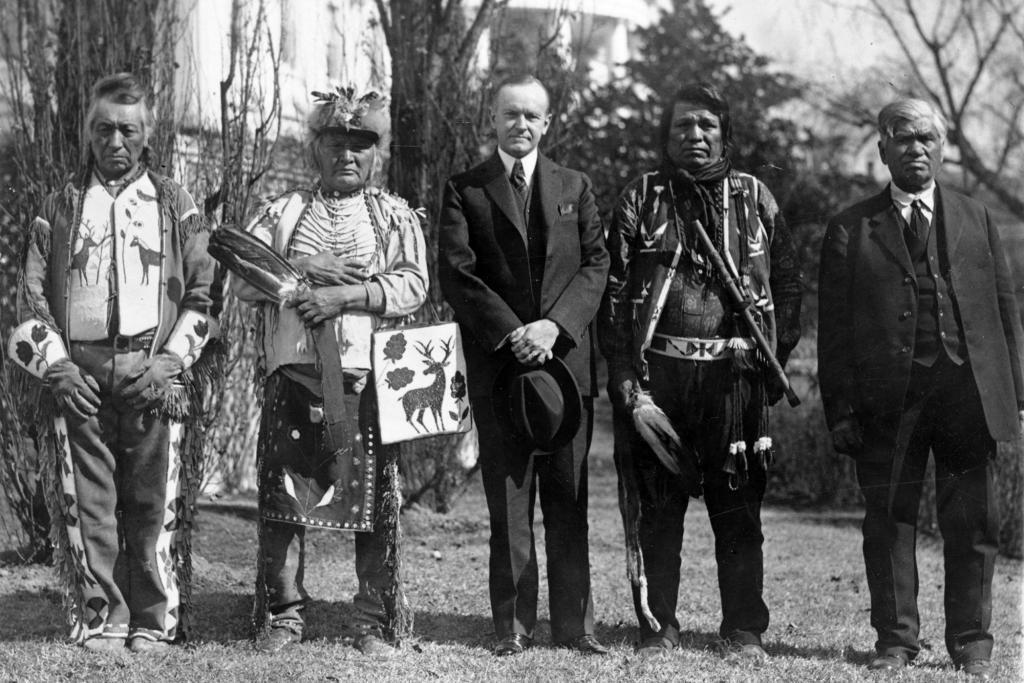
President Coolidge stands with four Osage Indians at a White House ceremony

Some authors have pointed to a connection between the social identity of Native Americans and their political status as members of a tribe. There are 561 federally recognized tribal governments in the United States, which have the right to establish their own legal requirements for membership. In recent times, legislation related to Indians uses the "political" definition, identifying as Indians those who are members of federally recognized tribes. Most often given is the two-part definition: an "Indian" is someone who is a member of an Indian tribe and an "Indian tribe" is any tribe, band, nation, or organized Indian community recognized by the United States.

The government and many tribes prefer this definition because it allows the tribes to determine the meaning of "Indianness" in their own membership criteria. However, some still criticize this, saying that the federal government's historic role in setting certain conditions on the nature of membership criteria means that this definition does not transcend federal government influence. Thus in some sense, one has greater claim to a Native American identity if one belongs to a federally recognized tribe, recognition that many who claim Indian identity do not have. Holly Reckord, an anthropologist who heads the BIA Branch of Acknowledgment and Recognition, discusses the most common outcome for those who seek membership: "We check and find that they haven't a trace of Indian ancestry, yet they are still totally convinced that they are Indians. Even if you have a trace of Indian blood, why do you want to select that for your identity, and not your Irish or Italian? It's not clear why, but at this point in time, a lot of people want to be Indian".

The Indian Arts and Crafts Act of 1990 attempts to take into account the limits of definitions based in federally recognized tribal membership. In the act, having the status of a state-recognized Indian tribe is discussed, as well as having tribal recognition as an "Indian artisan" independent of tribal membership. In certain circumstances, this allows people who identify as Indian to legally label their products as "Indian made", even when they are not members of a federally recognized tribe. In legislative hearings, one Indian artist, whose mother is not Indian but whose father is Seneca and who was raised on a Seneca reservation, said, "I do not question the rights of the tribes to set whatever criteria they want for enrollment eligibility; but in my view, that is the extent of their rights, to say who is an enrolled Seneca or Mohawk or Navajo or Cheyenne or any other tribe. Since there are mixed bloods with enrollment numbers and some of those with very small percentages of genetic Indian ancestry, I don't feel they have the right to say to those of us without enrollment numbers that we are not of Indian heritage, only that we are not enrolled.... To say that I am not [Indian] and to prosecute me for telling people of my Indian heritage is to deny me some of my civil liberties...and constitutes racial discrimination."

Some critics believe that using federal laws to define who is "Indian" allows continued government control over Indians, even as the government seeks to establish a sense of deference to tribal sovereignty. Critics say Indianness becomes a rigid legal term defined by the BIA, rather than an expression of tradition, history, and culture. For instance, some groups which claim descendants from tribes that predate European contact have not been able to achieve federal recognition. On the other hand, Indian tribes have participated in setting policy with BIA as to how tribes should be recognized. According to Rennard Strickland, an Indian Law scholar, the federal government uses the process of recognizing groups to "divide and conquer" Indians: "the question of who is 'more' or 'most' Indian may draw people away from common concerns".

Writers and scholars all describe Native American identity in the United States as a political status rather than a simple label. In this perspective, being a Native is connected to membership or citizenship in a tribal nation, and the tribal government reserves the power to decide the requirement for belonging. Additionally, this perspective emphasizes the relationship between the Native and the United States, and as well as, challenging the categorization of the "Native American."

The government data, as well as health systems reveal the other side of the Native identity and how it is defined and sometimes twisted. Many studies of cancer and health surveillance have shown that many American Indian and Alaskan people are often classified in the wrong racial group in medical records, which in turn, lead to the undercount of the Native populations and hiding the disparities within the Native communities. Problems such as misclassification and undercounting the Native populations prevents it from receiving proper benefits and makes it difficult to understand the conditions of the Natives.

The Native identity is also defined by how the people see themselves in everyday life. Studies with the Native people in the Southwestern United States have concluded that the languages, family relationships, as well as the communities they grew up in all influence how strong they feel about their identity as a Native and how they understood their place in the United States. This also helps to highlight that the "Native" identity isn't about blood, but rather about their daily lives, traditions, and the bond within people and community they grew up with.

=== Self-identification ===
In some cases, individuals and groups self-identify as Native American. A "self-identified Indian" is a person who may not satisfy the legal requirements which define a Native American according to the criteria set by the tribe or Nation in which they claim citizenship or heritage. Individuals may identify as Indian without outside verification in different settings, such as when filling out a census form or college application, or writing a letter to the editor of a newspaper. The United States census allows citizens to self-identify as any ethnicity, including "Native American/Alaska Native", without requiring validation. For proponents of self-identification, it allows both uniformity and includes many different ideas of "Indianness".

In 1990, only about 60 percent of the more than 1.8 million persons identifying themselves in the census as American Indian were actually enrolled in a federally recognized tribe. University of Kansas sociologist Joane Nagel traces the tripling in the number of Americans reporting American Indian as their race in the U.S. Census from 1960 to 1990 (from 523,591 to 1,878,285) to federal Indian policy, American ethnic politics, and American Indian political activism. She suggests much of the purported growth in numbers was due to "ethnic switching", where people who previously marked one group later mark another. She suggests this is made possible by American society's increasing focus on ethnicity as a social construct. In addition, since 2000, self-identification in U.S. censuses has allowed individuals to check multiple ethnic categories, which is a factor in the increased American Indian population since the 1990 census.

Many people who do not satisfy tribal citizenship or heritage requirements identify themselves as Native American due to their own ideas of biology or culture. Those who self-identify may consider identity to be a personal issue, based on the way they feel about themselves and their experiences. Horse (2001) proposes five influences on self-identity as Indian:

- "The extent to which one is grounded in one’s Native American language and culture, one’s cultural identity";
- "The validity of one’s American Indian genealogy";
- "The extent to which one holds a traditional American Indian general philosophy or worldview (emphasizing balance and harmony and drawing on Indian spirituality)";
- "One’s self-concept as an American Indian"; and
- "One’s enrollment (or lack of it) in a tribe."

Individuals may also self-identify because:

- they are not enrolled members of a federally recognized tribe, or
- they are members of groups which are not recognized as tribes
- they are members of tribes whose recognition was terminated by the government during assimilation and elimination programs in the 1950s and 1960s.

Some individuals who self-identify as Native American, or who seek to define "Indianness" differently than the tribes they claim to belong to, may do so for reasons such as "a longing for recognition." Cynthia Hunt, who self-identifies as a member of the state-recognized Lumbee tribe, says: "I feel as if I'm not a real Indian until I've got that BIA stamp of approval .... You're told all your life that you're Indian, but sometimes you want to be that kind of Indian that everybody else accepts as Indian." Louis Owens, who said his parents were both Native American although they were recorded as white, also expressed feelings of "not being a real Indian" because he was not enrolled in a tribe. (Note: If Louis Owens' father had been 1/2 Choctaw, and his mother 1/2 Cherokee, as he reported, both Owens and his parents would have qualified for enrollment. However, census, military and other official documents all list his parents and grandparents as white.) Despite this, he also wrote, "I am not a real Indian. ... Because growing up in different times, I naively thought that Indian was something we were, not something we did or had or were required to prove on demand. Listening to my mother's stories about Oklahoma, about brutally hard lives and dreams that cut across the fabric of every experience, I thought I was Indian."

Others whose careers involve Native American topics may self-identify for perceived advantages in academia, or to justify claims to land and territory. Journalist Helen Lewis suggests that personal trauma from unrelated events in someone's life, such as a difficult upbringing, may motivate them to reject identification with people they see as perpetrators of oppression (e.g., white people) and to identify with those they see as victims instead. Patrick Wolfe suggests that the problem is more structural, stating that the ideology of settler colonialism actively needs to erase and then reproduce Indigenous identity in order to create and justify claims to land and territory.

Self-identification alone is insufficient for membership in most recognized tribes. Judge Steve Russell (Cherokee Nation) has said, "The important issue is not who you claim but rather who claims you." Similarly, academic Kim TallBear (Sisseton Wahpeton Oyate) also says it's "a matter of who claims you". She suggests that self-identification by people without connections to or recognition from a tribe is "another kind of claim to own indigeneity", and may be motivated by "a moral claim or sense of belonging on the North American continent".

Garroutte says there are some practical problems with self-identification as a policy. She refers to the struggles of Indian service providers who deal with many people who claim Indian ancestors, some steps removed, which may strain or divert resources. She also writes that by privileging an individual's claim over a tribe's right to define its own citizenship, self-identification can be a threat to tribal sovereignty.

=== Pan-Indianism and pretendians ===
In 1911, Arthur C. Parker, Carlos Montezuma, and others founded the Society of American Indians, an early national Native American rights advocacy organization, founded and run primarily by Native Americans. The group campaigned for full U.S. citizenship for Indians, and other reforms, goals similar to other groups and fraternal clubs, which led to blurred distinctions between the different groups and their members. In 1918, Southern Arapaho Cleaver Warden testified in hearings related to Indian religious ceremonies, "We only ask a fair and impartial trial by reasonable white people, not half-breeds who do not know a bit of their ancestors or kindred. A true Indian is one who helps for a race and not that secretary of the Society of American Indians."

In the 1920s fraternal clubs based on "Indian" themes but open to, founded by, and sometimes solely consisting of, white people were common in New York City. Some included Native Americans in their leadership, and were dedicated to civil rights for Native Americans. Others were formed by non-Natives and included activities such as Playing Indian and bestowed titles such as "princess" and "chief" to non-Natives, allowing non-Natives to "try on" Indian identities. A non-Native woman calling herself "Princess Chinquilla" (who claimed to have been separated from her Cheyenne parents at birth) and her associate Red Fox James (aka Skiuhushu) (Blackfoot) created a fraternal club which they claimed was "founded by white people to help the red race". A court case was set to investigate their identities. Bureau of Indian Affairs Commissioner, John Collier also formed a similar club.

This 1848 drawing of Tecumseh was based on a sketch done from life in 1808

Questions of Native American identity experienced a resurgence and expanded meaning in the 1960s and 1970s with Native American civil rights movements. Groups like the American Indian Movement unified nationalist identity, in contrast to the "brotherhood of tribes" nationalism of groups like the National Indian Youth Council and the National Congress of American Indians. This pan-Indian approach to identity has been cited to the teachings of 19th-century Shawnee leader Tecumseh as an effort to unify all Indians against white oppression. (Note: Particularly cited is Tecumseh's concern with the alienation of Indian lands and his 1812 statement about Indian unity as discussed in Bonney (1977), p. 229.) The political and social movements of the 1960s and 1970s led to a dramatic change in how many Native Americans saw their identity, both as separate from non-Natives, as members of tribal nations, and as members of a unified category encompassing all Indians.

=== Genetic research ===
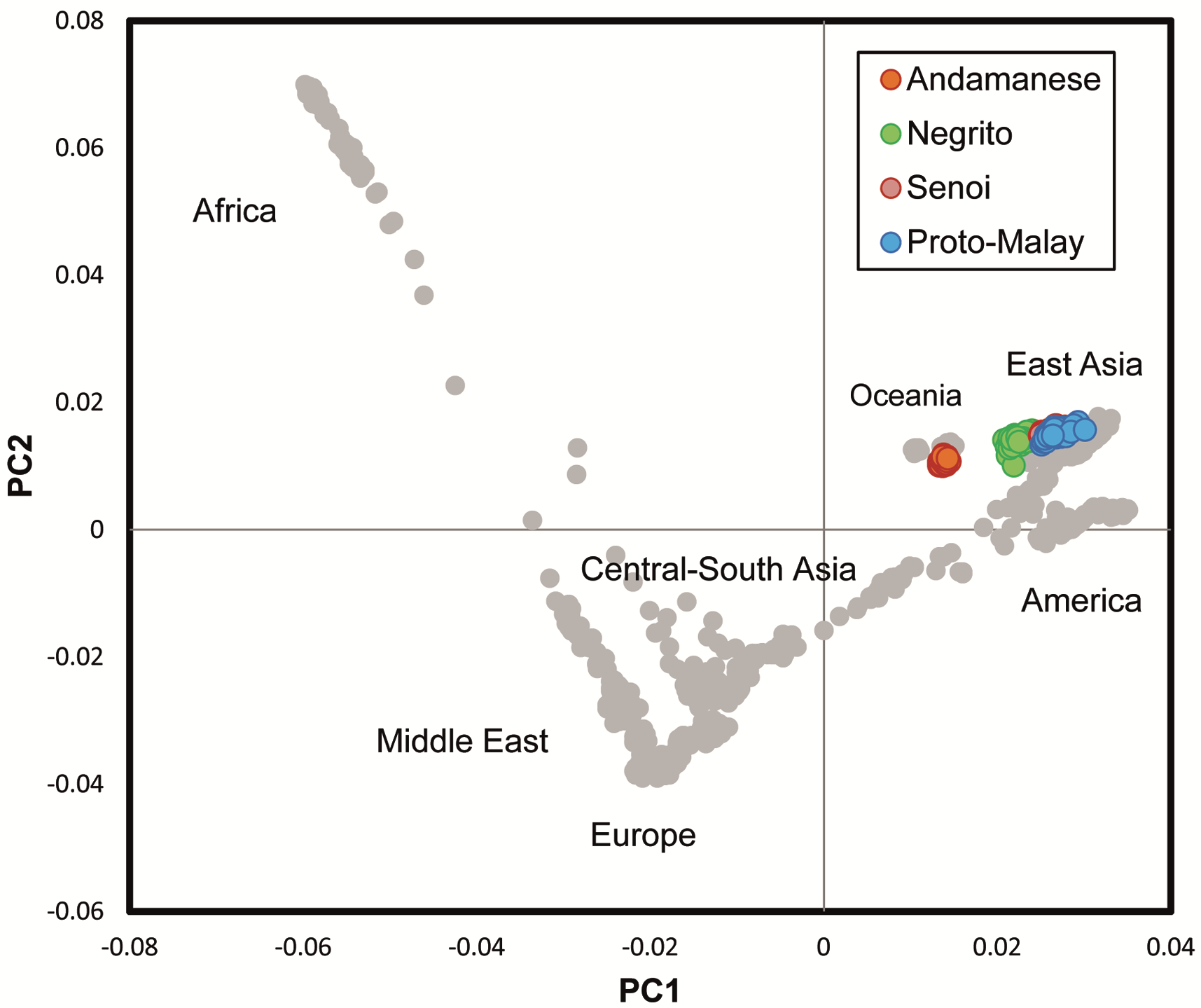
PCA of worldwide populations in HGDP.

In human population genetics, Native American ancestry results are based largely on genetic databases collected from people from South and Central America as well as Central Asian populations, and not on data isolated to Native Americans in the United States, due to a lack of Native American participants in these studies. These genetic indicators have also been detected in non-Indigenous populations. The accuracy of the results in these studies remains unclear.

Genetic research of Native American ancestry, as well as consumer DNA testing, has been heavily criticized by Native American academics such as geneticist and bioethicist Krystal Tsosie (Navajo) and academic Kim TallBear (Dakota), who have said that genetic tests cannot pinpoint descent from specific Native American tribes, and that tests cannot determine whether someone is Native American or not. Bioethicist and geneticist Náníbaaʼ Garrison (Diné) also said that no genetic test can determine who is Native American, nor can the tests definitively prove Native American ancestry, largely because of an insufficient number of North American Indigenous people in genetic databases. This concern is also shared by National Human Genome Research Institute (NHGRI) Bioethics Core Director Sara Hull and National Institute of Health (NIH) bioethicist Hina Walajahi, who adds that direct-to-consumer (DTC) genetic ancestry kits "fall short on accuracy because they only offer a probability toward a certain ancestry. So, a test that claims an individual has Native American ancestry, could be wrong." The Indigenous Peoples Council on Biocolonialism has also said that haplogroup testing is not a valid means of determining Native American ancestry, and that the concept of using genetic testing to determine who is or is not Native American threatens tribal sovereignty.

Genetically, Native Americans are most closely related to East Asian people, while approximately 37% of their ancestry is derived from Ancient North Eurasians. According to Jennifer Raff, Native Americans descend from admixture between Ancient North Eurasian populations and a daughter population of ancient East Asians, which lead to the emergence of the ancestral populations of the Indigenous peoples of the Americas. The exact location of where the admixture took place is unknown, and the migratory movements that united the two populations are a matter of debate.

==== Ethnicity admixture ====
A 2014 study analyzed the genetic ancestry profiles of more than 150,000 customers of the DNA testing company 23andMe. The ethnicity and identity data for the reference panels obtained from Durand, et al. was logged based on the participants' self-identification as Native American, European and African. The authors said that, on average, African Americans and White Americans had less than 1% of what they considered Native American ancestry, although some variation was observed, with those living west of the Mississippi River being more likely to have >1% of these indicators. Latinos averaged 18.0%, although there was a significant amount of variation by geographic and ethnic origin: Latinos from the Southwest had considerably higher percentage results than those from the East Coast of the United States or Caribbean.

==== Limitations of DNA research ====
Within the field of human population genetics, some genetic studies are considered more accurate than others. According to Bryc, et al., studies using genotype data can reliably detect Native American ancestry at low proportions; however, other studies have given results that vary greatly, and their estimates of ancestry are poorly quantified. Indigenous scholars have stated that DNA tests cannot reliably confirm Native American ancestry or tribal origin. While some genetic markers are considered more common among Native Americans, these markers are also found in Asia and other parts of the world. The most popular companies have no Indigenous North American DNA samples, and have stated that they use Central Asian and South or Central American populations as a reference instead; smaller companies may have a very small pool from one tribe who participated in a medical study. The exploitation of Indigenous genetic material – such as the theft of human remains, land and artifacts – has led to widespread distrust and even boycotts of DNA testing companies by Native communities. Attempts by non-Natives to racialize Indigenous identity by DNA tests have also been seen by Indigenous people as insensitive, racist, politically and financially motivated, and dangerous to the survival of Indigenous cultures.

Navajo geneticist and bioethicist Krystal Tsosie and Dakota academic Kim TallBear have written about individuals discovering purported Native American ancestry through DNA testing, who then self-identify as Native American in general, or as members or descendants of a specific tribe. Both have said that Native American identity is cultural and not biological, and have defended Indigenous sovereignty, and Indigenous cultural and political identities that they feel could be threatened when non-Natives use DNA testing to self-identify as Indigenous people. Tsosie states that commercial DNA testing companies do not have sufficient population samples to identify Native American ancestry, and suggests that those who subsequently claim to belong to specific tribes based on these results are not respecting those tribes' rules regarding citizenship status. Tsosie also says that "'Native American' is a political designation that confers rights" which are subsequently threatened when those rights are tied to DNA tests. TallBear states that not only is there no DNA test that can indicate a tribe, but "there is no DNA-test to prove you're Native American", and that white non-Natives with such DNA test results mostly continue to identify as white. Despite the limitations of commercial DNA tests and the position tribes have taken on them, many non-Natives still seek commercial DNA test services as they may feel they have no other way to confirm whether or not they have Indigenous ancestry.

== Specific tribes ==
=== Cherokee ===
Non-Native constructs of race and blood quantum are not factors in Cherokee Nation tribal citizenship eligibility (like the majority of Oklahoma tribes). To be considered a citizen in the Cherokee Nation, an individual must be a direct descendant of a Cherokee person, or a Cherokee freedmen ancestor, listed on the Dawes Rolls. The tribe currently has members who also have African, Latino, Asian, white and other ancestry. The other two Cherokee tribes, the Eastern Band of Cherokee Indians and the United Keetoowah Band of Cherokee Indians, do have a minimum blood quantum requirement. Numerous Cherokee heritage groups, only some of which are authorized by Cherokee communities, operate in the Southeastern U.S.

The Cherokee, like most other Southeastern tribes, are historically matrilineal, with kinship and clan membership being determined through the mother's line. In 1825, when the Cherokee National Council extended citizenship to biracial children of Cherokee men, the strictly matrilineal definition of clans was altered. The constitution also stated that "No person who is of negro or mulatlo [sic] parentage, either by the father or mother side, shall be eligible to hold any office of profit, honor or trust under this Government", with an exception for, "negroes and descendants of white and Indian men by negro women who may have been set free". From the initial constitution, the Cherokee have reserved the right to define who is and is not Cherokee as a political rather than racial distinction.

=== Navajo ===
There were 158,633 people who identified as Navajo enumerated in the 1980 census, and 219,198 in the 1990 census. The Navajo Nation is the Native American nation with the largest number of enrolled citizens. According to Thornton, there are only a small number of people who self-identify as Navajo who are not citizens.

=== Lumbee ===
In 1952, Lumbee people who were organized under the name Croatan Indians voted to adopt the name of "Lumbee," for the Lumber River near their homelands. The US federal government acknowledged them as being Indians in the 1956 Lumbee Act but not as a federally recognized tribe. The Act withheld the full benefits of federal recognition from the tribe. Since then, the Lumbee people have tried to appeal to Congress for legislation to gain full federal recognition. Their effort has been opposed by several federally recognized tribes.

When the Lumbee of North Carolina petitioned for recognition in 1974, many federally recognized tribes adamantly opposed them. These tribes made no secret of their fear that passage of the legislation would dilute services to historically recognized tribes. The Lumbee were at one point known by the state as the Cherokee Indians of Robeson County and applied for federal benefits under that name in the early 20th century. The Eastern Band of Cherokee Indians has been at the forefront of the opposition of the Lumbee. If granted full federal recognition, the designation would bring tens of millions of dollars in federal benefits, and also the chance to open a casino along Interstate 95 (which would compete with a nearby Eastern Cherokee Nation casino).

== See also ==
- Determining Native American and Indigenous Canadian identities
- Native American genealogy
- Pretendian
- Racial isolates in the United States
- Australian Aboriginal identity
