= Cherokee descent =

Sociocultural identification

Individuals with some degree of documented Cherokee descent who do not meet the criteria for Cherokee tribal citizenship may describe themselves as "being of Cherokee descent" or as "being a Cherokee descendant". These terms are also used by non-Native individuals whose ancestry has not been independently verified.

According to Gregory D. Smithers, a large number of Americans describe themselves in this way: "In 2000, the federal census reported that 729,533 Americans self-identified as Cherokee. By 2010, that number increased, with the Census Bureau reporting that 819,105 Americans claimed at least one Cherokee ancestor." By contrast, as of 2012 there were only 330,716 enrolled Cherokee citizens (Cherokee Nation: 288,749; United Keetoowah Band: 14,300; Eastern Band: 14,667).

== Citizenship ==
There are three federally recognized Cherokee tribes: the Eastern Band of Cherokee Indians (EBCI) in North Carolina, the United Keetoowah Band of Cherokee Indians (UKB) in Oklahoma, and the Cherokee Nation (CN) in Oklahoma. Enrollment criteria are different for each nation.

- Eastern Band citizenship requirements are as follows:

"1. A direct lineal ancestor must appear on the 1924 Baker Roll of the Eastern Band of Cherokee Indians.
"2. You must possess at least 1/16 degree of Eastern Cherokee blood. Please note: Blood quantum is calculated from your ancestor listed on the 1924 Baker Roll."

- United Keetoowah Band requirements are as follows:

"To be eligible for UKB membership, Cherokees must be able to provide documentation that they are a descendant of an individual listed on the 1949 United Keetoowah Band Base Roll or of an individual listed on the final Dawes Roll."
"The UKB has a minimum blood quantum requirement of one quarter (1/4) degree Keetoowah Cherokee blood."

- Cherokee Nation requirements are as follows:

The applicant must "provide documents that connect you to an enrolled lineal ancestor, who is listed on the 'DAWES ROLL' FINAL ROLLS OF CITIZENS AND FREEDMEN OF THE FIVE CIVILIZED TRIBES, Cherokee Nation with a blood degree."

== Social recognition ==
Kim TallBear (Dakota), author of Native American DNA: Tribal Belonging and the False Promise of Genetic Science, says that Indigenous identity is not about any distant ancestor, but rather political citizenship, culture, kinship, and daily, lived experience as part of an Indigenous community.

There are very specific tribal enrollment rules from tribe to tribe, it's pretty complicated. Those rules sit within a broader idea though, that one needs to have relatively close or lived social relations with other tribal kin that you are claiming. Being able to produce the genealogical documentation to access tribal citizenship is one way of showing that a tribe claims you. They can claim you through official legal means. But you can also have your tribal community claim you through social means that are not official legal means.

She states that while DNA can indicate one's biological relatives, actual tribal membership is a legal category based on complex understandings of family relations, governmental and tribal rules, and reservation histories.

== Reasons for self-identification without citizenship or social recognition ==
Self-identification occurs when a person states that they have Indigenous identity or descent with no confirmation or acceptance from the tribe they claim. There are many reasons people may self-identify as Cherokee or as Cherokee descendants without meeting enrollment criteria and without being part of the Cherokee community:

- Many Cherokee heritage groups, organizations that explore and appropriate aspects of Cherokee history and culture, exist across the US, as well as unrecognized tribes and other organizations, with one estimate putting the combined number as high as 200. Membership in these groups, in some cases, requires genealogical proof of Cherokee ancestry, but many others have no requirements at all.
- Many non-Indigenous American families, especially those with roots in the South, have a family folklore and oral histories of Cherokee ancestry. This has sometimes been called "Cherokee Princess Syndrome" or having a "blood myth". The academic Joel W. Martin noted that "an astonishing number of southerners assert they have a grandmother or great-grandmother who was some kind of Cherokee, often a princess", and that such myths serve settler purposes in aligning American frontier romance with southern regionalism and pride.
- Many Americans suggest Cherokee descent to explain physical traits that they believe are evidence of non-European or non-African ancestries, such as "high cheek bones", tan skin, straight dark hair, and keloid scars. Henry Louis Gates Jr. suggests that, in the case of African Americans, this can sometimes be a more tolerable explanation for these physical features than the realities of slavery and rape.
- TallBear describes some individuals asserting Native American ancestry based on DNA testing, who begin searching for "Cherokee ancestral lines" after this. She states, however, "There is no DNA test to prove you're Native American", and that this group mostly continues to identify as white.

== Issues with descent-based identity claims ==
Individuals who claim Cherokee descent do not meet the criteria necessary to claim Native American identity under the provisions of the American Indian Arts and Crafts Act, except for those enrolled in one of the seven state-recognized tribes who identify as Cherokee.

== See also ==
- Cherokee Nation Truth in Advertising for Native Art
- Croatan descent
- Índia pega no laço
- Native American genealogy
- Native American identity in the United States
- Native American tribal rolls
- Plastic shaman
- Pretendian
