= Steve Russell (writer) =

Cherokee journalist and academic

- Born: 1947 (age 78–79); Bristow, Oklahoma
- Citizenship: Cherokee Nation
- Education: Master of Judicial Studies, University of Nevada at Reno, 1993. Thesis: Ethnic Cleansing and Land Ownership: Why the Native American Graves Protection and Repatriation Act Does Not Protect Native American Graves in Texas. J.D.,University of Texas at Austin, 1975. B.S.Ed., magna cum laude, University of Texas at Austin, 1972. High school dropout (9th grade).
- Occupations: Professor Emeritus, Author
- Website: https://steverussell-9575.medium.com

Steve Russell, an enrolled member of the Cherokee Nation, was a poet, journalist and academic, as well as a former trial court judge and Associate Professor Emeritus of Criminal Justice, Indiana University Bloomington.

== Early life and education ==
Despite being Cherokee, Russell was raised in the Muscogee Creek Nation in Oklahoma.

== Cherokee politics ==
Russell was frequently critical of "wannabe" Indians - that is to say, people who claim falsely and without tribal recognition to have a Native American identity. He was one of the earliest critics of Andrea Smith, calling her out in a 2008 editorial in the major American Indian new outlet, Indian Country Media Network. He has also long documented corruption and bullying within Cherokee tribal politics.

The Native American Journalists Association twice recognized Russell's work, honoring his op-ed columns "Full-Blooded Indians—Face the Most Anti-Indian Racism" in 2013 and "Blacks and Indians Should Stand Together Against a Common Oppressor" in 2014 as the best Native op-eds in those years.

== Academic writing ==
Russell's Sequoyah Rising: Problems in Post-Colonial Tribal Governance is probably his best-known work. Described by the American Indian Quarterly as being concerned "with the bases of tribal citizenship," the book discusses the problems of Indian identity in the context of continuing US occupation and encroachment. Tom Holm wrote in Wíčazo Ša Review that "Russell's concise and insightful presentation of the course of American Indian policy is exceptional and should immediately be adopted by all who teach courses on Native American history and law," while the European Journal of American Studies noted that "Although clear that much of the blame for this must lie with a combination of federal government attempts to destroy Native control over Native affairs and a colonial culture of welfare dependency, nonetheless Russell argues that the power to self-organize means that many of the solutions lie in Indian hands."

Books

- World War ISIS: How to Kill a Death Cult and Avoid the End of Days (Dog Iron Press 2016).
- Ray Sixkiller’s Cherokee Nation: U.S. Election 2012 (Dog Iron Press 2014).
- American Indians Dream: A Movement of Our Own (Dog Iron Press 2014).
- Wicked Dew (Dog Iron Press 2012).
- Ceremonies of Innocence: Essays from the Indian Wars (Dog Iron Press 2012).
- Sequoyah Rising: Problems in Post-Colonial Tribal Governance (Carolina Academic Press 2010).

== See also ==
- List of Native American jurists
