= Dawes Rolls =

1893 registry of citizens living on US tribal lands

The Dawes Rolls (also known as the Final Rolls of Citizens and Freedmen of the Five Civilized Tribes or the Dawes Commission of Final Rolls) were created by the United States Dawes Commission. The commission was authorized by United States Congress in 1893 to execute the General Allotment Act of 1887.

Traditionally, the land in these tribal communities had been held communally. With the establishment of the Dawes Commission, the ruling was made by the colonial agents to divide the land into parcels and institute a system of individual ownership in accordance with US laws, overriding the treaty and tribal laws of the region. To allot the communal lands, citizens of the Five Tribes (Cherokee, Chickasaw, Choctaw, Creek, and Seminole) were to be enumerated and registered by the US government. These counts also included the Freedmen – formerly enslaved African-Americans who had been emancipated after the American Civil War, and their descendants.

The rolls were used to assign allotments to heads of household and to provide an equitable division of all monies obtained from sales of surplus lands. These rolls became known as the Dawes Rolls. When word got out that people could get land, many non-Natives appeared at the offices and falsely claimed to be Native. Most of these false claimants claimed to be Cherokee. Family myths still persist of "hiding in the hills", or of being "rejected from the rolls", or "refusing to enroll" when the reason for having not been enrolled is that the applicants were simply not Native American.

== Enumeration and enrollment ==
The Dawes Commission went to the individual tribes to obtain the membership lists, but it took a series of attempts to gain anything approaching an accurate count. In 1898, Congress passed the Curtis Act, which provided that a new roll would be taken and supersede all previous rolls. Difficulties in enumerating the population included the forced migrations of the period as well as the American Civil War. Additionally, non-Native census takers introduced the idea of Blood Quantum, a concept previously foreign to the tribal communities. Those recording this percentage of ancestry wrote down an estimation, based on physical appearance and personal opinion if the individual was present.

Tribal citizens were listed under several categories:

- Citizen by Blood
  - New Born Citizen by Blood
  - Minor Citizens by Blood
- Citizen by Marriage
- Freedmen (persons formerly enslaved by Native Americans or adopted by the Cherokee tribe)
  - New Born Freedmen
  - Minor Freedmen
- Delaware Indians (those adopted by the Cherokee tribe were enrolled as a separate group within the Cherokee)

More than 250,000 people applied for membership, and the Dawes Commission enrolled just over 100,000. Most were rejected because they were non-Natives who showed up demanding land, but could not prove any connection to an existing Native community, such as naming living relatives or speaking the Native language. Overrun with prospective claimants, the commission was overwhelmed and instituted guidelines:

It rejected the unconscionable claim that a white person once admitted into the tribe by marriage to an Indian could confer citizenship upon any white person whom he might afterwards marry and upon his white descendants. It also uncovered a great mass of nauseous evidence, and rejected a large number of claims upon the ground they had been advanced through perjury and forgery.

An act of Congress on April 26, 1906 closed the rolls on March 5, 1907. An additional 312 persons were enrolled under an act approved August 1, 1914.

While some initially refused to be enumerated, almost all were later arrested and enrolled against their will; enrollment was not a matter of "choice". Refusing to be enumerated, and even fleeing, would mean warrants being issued for the person's arrest; they could then be treated brutally and imprisoned in the process of being enrolled by force. Still, due to understandable distrust of the government, there were those who tried to avoid enumeration. Notable among those who resisted were Muscogee Chitto Harjo (Crazy Snake), and Cherokee Redbird Smith. But both Harjo and Smith were eventually coerced into enrolling. According to Cherokee professor Steve Russell, some Natives hiding in the Cookson Hills never enrolled, but some of them were later arrested and forcibly enrolled, while others were enrolled on their behalf by people in their communities. Additionally all individuals on the Census Roll of 1896 were enrolled without notification to the parties involved. The only real choice to avoid enumeration entirely meant completely leaving one's community and assimilating. Since that period, the tribes have relied on the Dawes Rolls as part of the membership qualification process, using them as records of citizens at a particular time, and requiring new members to document direct descent from a person or persons on these rolls. Courts have upheld this rule even when it has been proven that a brother or sister of an ancestor was listed on the rolls but not the direct ancestor himself/herself.

Another issue on the Dawes Rolls are people termed "Five-Dollar Indians". Some white people bribed government officials to obtain land allotments, but this was not as widespread as some would believe.

Gregory Smithers, associate professor of history at Virginia Commonwealth University stated, "These were opportunistic white men who wanted access to land or food rations. ... These were people who were more than happy to exploit the Dawes Commission – and government agents, for $5, were willing to turn a blind eye to the graft and corruption." For the small minority that managed this, this fraudulent enrollment may have earned white people potential benefits for themselves and their descendants, but also could have subjected them to further removal, relocation or incarceration. There were also land runs during this era, and other methods for white people to obtain land. Most of the white people on the Dawes Rolls are noted as included due to marrying a member of the tribe and having Indian children.

The Dawes Rolls, though recognized as flawed, are still essential to the citizenship process of the Nations that include them in their laws. The federal government uses them in determining blood-quantum status of individuals for Certificate of Degree of Indian Blood. Blood quantum listed on the Dawes Rolls ranges from 4/4th (sometimes known as "full blood" to 1/256th).

== See also ==
- 1896 Applications for Enrollment, Five Tribes (Overturned)
- Baker Roll
- Blood quantum laws
- Dawes Act
- Guion Miller Roll
- Native American Freedmen
  - Cherokee Freedmen
  - Chickasaw Freedmen
  - Choctaw Freedmen
  - Muscogee Freedmen
- Native American tribal rolls
- Sooner
- United Keetoowah Band Base Roll
