= Blood quantum laws =

Laws on Native American status

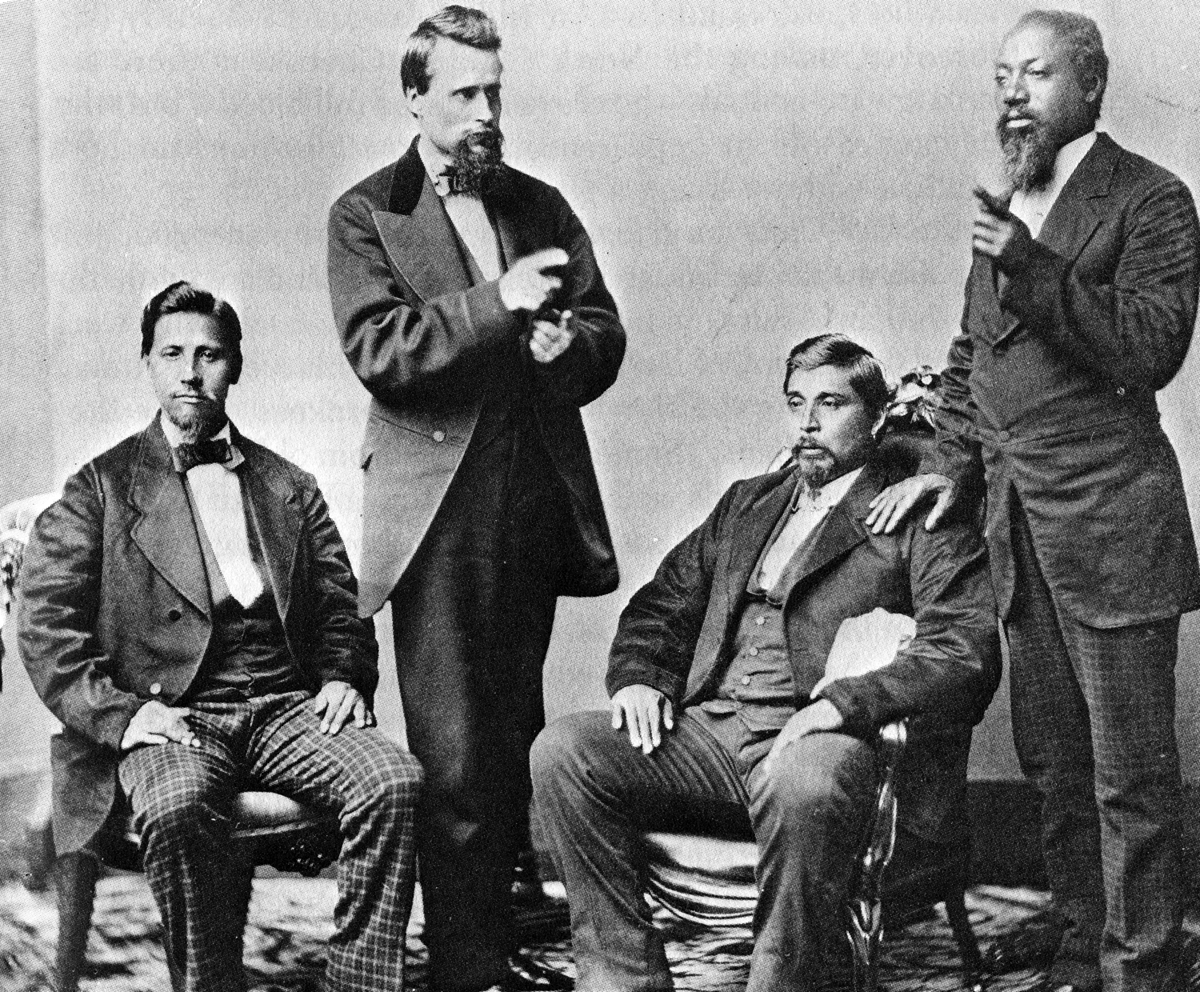
Members of the Muscogee (Creek) Nation in Oklahoma around 1877, including some with partial European and African ancestry

Blood quantum laws or Indian blood laws are laws that define Native Americans in the United States status by fractions of Native American ancestry. These laws were enacted by the federal government and state governments as a way to establish legally defined racial population groups. By contrast, many tribes do not include blood quantum as part of their own enrollment criteria. Blood quantum laws were first imposed by white settlers in the 18th century. Blood quantum (BQ) continues to be a controversial topic.

== History ==
In 1705, the Colony of Virginia adopted the "Indian Blood law" that limited the civil rights of Native Americans and persons of one-half or more Native American ancestry. This also had the effect of regulating who would be classified as Native American. In the 19th and 20th centuries, the US government believed tribal members had to be defined for the purposes of federal benefits or annuities paid under treaties resulting from land cessions. According to the Pocahontas Clause of the Racial Integrity Act of 1924, a white person in Virginia could have a maximum blood quantum of one-sixteenth Native American ancestry without losing his or her legal status as white.

The Indian Removal Act and the Trail of Tears led to a major enumeration of Native Americans as well as controversies and misunderstandings about blood quantum that persist to this day. As they were being forcibly driven out of their ancestral homelands and subjected to genocide, many Natives understandably feared and distrusted the government and attempted to avoid enumeration. The only way to do this was to completely flee the Native American community during a time of widespread persecution. Native Americans who tried to refuse, if they were not already in a prison camp, had warrants issued for their arrests; they were forcibly rounded up and documented against their will. It is a modern misconception that this enumeration was equivalent to contemporary tribal enrollment, or in any way optional.

The concept of blood quantum was not widely applied by the United States government until the Indian Reorganization Act of 1934. At the time, the federal government required persons to have a certain BQ to be recognized as Native American, and thus eligible for financial and other benefits under treaties or sales of land. The Indian Reorganization Act of 1934 marked the beginning of the US government's widespread application of the blood quantum idea. At the time, for someone to be recognized as Native American and be qualified for financial and other benefits under treaties or land sales, they had to meet a specific BQ requirement set by the federal government.

Native American tribes did not formally use blood quantum law until the government introduced the Indian Reorganization Act of 1934, instead determining tribal status on the basis of kinship, lineage, and family ties. Some tribes, such as the Navajo Nation, did not adopt the type of written constitution suggested in that law until the 1950s. Given intermarriage among tribes, particularly those that are closely related and have settled near each other, critics object to the federal requirement that individuals identify as belonging to only one tribe when defining blood quantum. They believe this reduces an individual's valid membership in more than one tribe, as well as costing some persons their qualification as Native American because of having ancestry from more than one tribe but not 1/4 or more from one tribe. Overall, the number of registered members of many Native American tribes has been reduced because of tribal laws that define and limit the definition of acceptable blood quantum.

Native American nations have continued to assert sovereignty and treaty rights, including their own criteria for tribal membership, which vary among them. In the early 21st century, some nations, such as the Wampanoag tightened their enrollment criteria and excluded persons who had previously been considered members. Challenges to such policies have been pursued by those excluded. Native American tribes have maintained their claims to sovereignty and treaty rights, as well as their own membership requirements. By the early 21st century, many Native American tribes had modified their enrollment requirements and banned people who were already considered members. Those who are not members had tried to challenge policies to become a member.

== Measuring an individual's blood quantum ==
A person's blood quantum (BQ) is defined as the fraction of their ancestors, out of their total ancestors, who are documented as full-blood Native Americans. For instance, a person who has one parent who is a full-blood Native American and one who has no Native ancestry has a BQ of 1/2. Nations that use blood quantum often do so in combination with other criteria. There are different BQ that are required for enrollment in different tribes. For example, to be eligible for enrollment, the Omaha Tribe of Nebraska requires a BQ of 1/4 Native American and descent from a registered ancestor, while the Cherokee Nation of Oklahoma just requires lineal descent from a proven Cherokee ancestor recorded on the Dawes Rolls and has no BQ requirements at all. Others use a tiered system, with the Choctaw Nation of Oklahoma using lineal descent for general enrollment, but requiring a BQ of "at least one-fourth" for all tribal council candidates.

== Tribe requirements for citizenship ==
Prior to colonization, individual tribes had established their own requirements for citizenship, including the practice of banishment for those who had committed unforgivable crimes. Some traditional communities still hold to these precontact standards. Tribes that follow lineal descent may require a Native American ancestor who is listed on a prior tribal rations-issue roll, such as the Dawes Rolls for the Five Civilized Tribes in Oklahoma or a late 19th-century census. In some cases, they may also require a certain percentage of Native American ancestry and demonstrated residence with a tribe or commitment to the community. Few tribes allow citizens to claim ancestry in more than one tribe. The Little Traverse Bay Bands of Odawa Indians accept persons of 1/4 Native American ancestry plus documented descent from an ancestor listed in specific records. In part, this recognizes that the Odawa people historically had a territory on both sides of what is now the border between the US and Canada. Each federally recognized tribe has established its own criteria for membership. Given the new revenues that many tribes are realizing from gambling casinos and other economic development, or from settlement of 19th-century land claims, some have established more restrictive rules to limit membership. Between 1904 and 1919, tribal members of mixed African and Native American ancestry were disenrolled from the Chitimacha tribe of Louisiana, and their descendants have since then been denied tribal membership.

In 2007 the Cherokee Nation voted in the majority to exclude as citizens those Cherokee Freedmen who had no documented ancestors on the Cherokee-by-blood list of the Dawes Rolls. However, the Cherokee Supreme Court ruled in 2005 that they were legitimate citizens of the nation at that time. After the Civil War, the US required the Cherokee and other Native American tribes that had supported the Confederacy to make new treaties. They also required them to emancipate their slaves and to give full tribal citizenship to those freedmen who wanted to stay in tribal territory. The Cherokee Freedmen often had intermarried and some had Cherokee ancestry at the time of the Dawes Rolls, qualifying as Cherokee by blood, but registrars typically classified them as Freedmen.

Similarly, in 2000, the Seminole Nation of Oklahoma attempted to exclude two bands of Seminole Freedmen from citizenship to avoid including them in the settlement of land claims in Florida, where Seminole Freedmen had also owned land taken by the US government.

Since 1942, the Seminole have, at times, tried to exclude Black Seminoles from the tribe. The freedmen were listed separately on the Dawes Rolls and suffered segregation in Oklahoma. More recently, the Seminole refused to share with them the revenues of 20th-century US government settlements of land claims. The Center for Constitutional Rights has filed an amicus brief, taking up the legal case of the Black Seminoles and criticizing some officials of the Bureau of Indian Affairs for collaborating in this discrimination by supporting tribal autonomy in lawsuits. By treaty, after the American Civil War, the Seminole were required to emancipate slaves and provide Black Seminoles with all the rights of full-blood Indian members.

"American Indian tribes located on reservations tend to have higher BQ requirements for membership than those located off reservation....[reference to table] [O]ver 85 percent of tribes requiring more than a one-quarter BQ for membership are reservation based, as compared with less than 64 percent of those having no minimum requirement. Tribes on reservations have seemingly been able to maintain exclusive membership by setting higher blood quanta, since the reservation location has generally served to isolate the tribe from non-Indians and intermarriage with them."

== Impact ==
Many Native Americans have become used to the idea of "blood quantum". The blood quantum laws have caused problems in Native American families whose members were inaccurately recorded as having differing full or partial descent from particular tribes. In some cases, blood quantum has strained families and relationships.

At certain times, some state governments classified persons with African American and Native American admixture solely as African American, largely because of racial discrimination related to slavery history and the concept of the one drop rule. This was prevalent in the South after Reconstruction, when white-dominated legislatures imposed legal segregation, which classified the entire population only as white or colored (Native Americans, some of whom were of mixed race, were included in the latter designation).

It related to the racial caste system of slavery before the American Civil War. Some critics argue that blood quantum laws helped create racism among tribal members. The historian Tony Seybert contends that was why some members of the so-called Five Civilized tribes were slaveholders. The majority of slave owners were of mixed-European ancestry. Some thought they were of higher status than full-blood Indians and people of African ancestry. Other historians contend that the Cherokee and other tribes held slaves because it was in their economic interest and part of the general southeastern culture. Cherokee and other tribes had also traditionally taken captives in warfare to use as slaves, though their institution differed from what developed in the southern colonies.

=== Population decline due to exogamy ===
Nationwide, 54-61% of all Native Americans marry non-Natives, which is a much higher rate than for any other racial group. It is projected that the Minnesota Chippewa Tribe will experience a gradual population decrease in the coming decades, unless it lowers its current membership requirement of at least 25% Native ancestry, as a consequence of tribal members having children with non-Native Americans for several generations.

=== DNA ancestry testing ===
No federally recognized tribe enrolls citizens solely based on DNA testing, as it generally cannot distinguish among tribes. Some tribes may require DNA testing only to document that a child is related to particular parents. Many researchers have published articles that caution that genetic ancestry DNA testing has limitations and should not be depended on by individuals to answer all their questions about heritage.

Many African Americans assume they have some Native American ancestry. But, in the PBS series led by historian Henry Louis Gates Jr., called African American Lives, geneticists said DNA evidence shows that Native American ancestry is far less common than previously assumed; of the group tested in the series, only two of the people showed likely Native ancestry.

Only 5 percent of African Americans have at least one-eighth Native American ancestry (equivalent to one great-grandparent). On the other hand, nearly 78 percent of African Americans have at least one-eighth European ancestry (the equivalent to one great-grandparent), and nearly 20 percent have at least one-quarter European ancestry (the equivalent to one grandparent.)

In response, one critic asserted the percentage must be higher because there are so many family stories (the reasons for which Gates and, notably, Chris Rock explored in the documentary), but felt that many people did not always talk about it because to acknowledge it would be to deny their African heritage.

Some critics thought the PBS series African American Lives did not sufficiently explain such limitations of DNA testing for assessment of heritage. In terms of persons searching for ethnic ancestry, they need to understand that Y-chromosome and mtDNA (mitochondrial DNA) testing looks only at "direct" line male and female ancestors, and thus can fail to pick up many other ancestors' heritage. Newer DNA tests can survey all the DNA that can be inherited from either parent of an individual, but at a cost of precision. DNA tests that survey the full DNA strand focus on "single nucleotide polymorphisms" or SNPs, but SNPs might be found in Africans, Asians, and people from every other part of the world. Full survey DNA testing cannot accurately determine an individual's full ancestry. Though DNA testing for ancestry is limited, more recent genetic testing research in 2015, have found that varied ancestries show different tendencies by region and sex of ancestors. These studies found that on average, African Americans have 73.2–82.1% West African, 16.7%–29% European, and 0.8–2% Native American genetic ancestry, with large variation between individuals.

A notable debate in 2019 over the validity of DNA testing for Native American ancestry arose over the controversies surrounding Elizabeth Warren's ancestry.

=== Tribal rolls ===
Basing citizenship off specific enrollment rolls, like the Dawes Rolls (that were taken after more than 80 years after Removal, after the American Civil War, and after tribal government restructuring), is what scholar Fay A. Yarbrough calls "dramatically different from older conceptions" of tribal identity based on clan relationships, "in which individuals could be fully," for example, "Cherokee without possessing any Cherokee ancestry." And that by the tribe later "developing a quantifiable definition of Cherokee identity based on ancestry," this "would dramatically affect the process of enrollment late in the nineteenth century and the modern procedure of obtaining citizenship in the Cherokee Nation, both of which require tracing an individuals' lineage to a 'Cherokee by blood.'" Thus, the Dawes Roll still upholds "by blood" language and theory of its time even though the tribe does not require blood quantum. Author Robert J. Conley has stated that if a tribe like the Cherokee Nation are "really serious about exercising its sovereignty and determining its membership," then it should not use the roll that "was put together by the U.S. government and then closed by the U.S. government," meaning that a tribal nation is still subject to the settler definitions of its citizens when other outside nations do not require rolls, ethnicity, race, or blood quantum for citizenship, but rather birth location and descendance.

== U.S. Census ==
The U.S. Census is conducted every 10 years and is used to get a population count. The National Research Council noted in 1996, "The U.S. census decennial enumerations indicate a Native American population growth for the United States that has been nearly continuous since 1900 (except for the 1918 flu pandemic that caused serious losses), to 1.42 million by 1980 and to over 1.9 million by 1990." In the 2000 census, there were 2.5 million Native Americans. Since 1960, people may self-identify their ancestry on the US Census. Native American activism and a rising interest in Native American history appear to have resulted in more individuals identifying as having Native American ancestry on the census.

== Implementation ==
Many Native American tribes continue to employ blood quantum in current tribal laws to determine who is eligible for membership or citizenship in the tribe or Native American nation. These often require a minimum degree of blood relationship and often an ancestor listed in a specific tribal census from the late 19th century or early 20th century. The Eastern Band of Cherokee Indians of North Carolina, for example, require an ancestor listed in the 1924 Baker census and a minimum of 1/16 Cherokee blood inherited from their ancestor(s) on that roll. Meanwhile, the Cherokee Nation requires applicants to descend from an ancestor in the 1906 Dawes roll (direct lineal ancestry), but does not impose minimum blood quantum requirement. The United Keetoowah Band requires a minimum 1/4 blood quantum.

The Mashantucket Pequot tribe on the other hand, base their tribal membership on an individual proving descent, by recognized genealogical documentation from one or more members of the eleven families included on the 1900 US census of the tribe.

The Northern Ute Tribe require a 5/8 blood quantum, making them the only tribe to require a number greater than 1/2. The Miccosukee of Florida, the Mississippi Choctaw, and the St. Croix Chippewa of Wisconsin all require one-half "tribal blood quantum", also among the higher percentages.

At the other end of the scale, some tribes, such as the Kaw Nation, have no blood quantum requirement.

Many tribes, such as Alabama-Quassarte Tribal Town and the Wyandotte Nation, require an unspecified amount of Indian ancestry (known as "lineal descendancy") documented by descent from a recognized member. Others require a specified degree of Indian ancestry but an unspecified share of ancestry from the ancestral tribe or tribes from which the contemporary tribal entity is derived, such as the Grand Traverse Band of Ottawa and Chippewa Indians and the Poarch Band of Creek Indians. Many tribes today are confederations of different ethnic groups joined into a single political entity making the determination of blood quantum challenging.

Other tribes require a minimum blood degree only for tribal members born "off" (outside) the nominal reservation. This is a concept comparable to a combination of the legal principles of Jus soli and Jus sanguinis in the nationality laws of modern sovereign states.

The Red Lake Nation of Minnesota declared in 2019 that all original enrollees on the tribe's 1958 roll were to be "considered full-bloods", regardless of their actual blood quantum as recorded on the roll. Since the tribal blood requirement for membership was (and still is) 1/4, the implication of this "resetting" of the original tribal members' blood quantum is that the grandchild of a person on the 1958 roll who was recorded as 1/4 Chippewa is now eligible for tribal membership.

== Tribes requiring to a certain degree blood quantum for citizenship ==
5/8 (equivalent to five great-grandparents)	1/2 (equivalent to one parent)	1/4 (equivalent to one grandparent)	1/8 (equivalent to one great-grandparent)	1/16 (equivalent to one great-great-grandparent)	1/32 (equivalent to one great-great-great-grandparent)
Northern Ute Tribe	Chippewa Cree, Montana	Absentee-Shawnee Tribe of Indians, Oklahoma	Agua Caliente Band of Cahuilla Indians, California	Caddo Nation	Jena Band of Choctaw Indians, Louisiana
	Kialegee Tribal Town	Ak-Chin Indian Community, Arizona	Apache Tribe of Oklahoma	Confederated Tribes of the Grand Ronde Community of Oregon	Wichita and Affiliated Tribes (Wichita, Keechi, Waco and Tawakonie)
	Miccosukee Tribe of Indians of Florida	Blackfeet Tribe of the Blackfeet Indian Reservation of Montana	Comanche Nation, Oklahoma	Confederated Tribes of Siletz Indians	
	Mississippi Band of Choctaw Indians, Mississippi	Cheyenne and Arapaho Tribes, Oklahoma	Delaware Nation, Oklahoma	Eastern Band of Cherokee Indians, North Carolina	
	Pueblo of Isleta, New Mexico	Colville Confederated Tribes, Washington	Fort Belknap Indian Reservation, Aaniiih and Nakoda, Montana	Fort Independence Indian Community of Paiute Indians of the Fort Independence Reservation, California	
	St. Croix Chippewa Indians of Wisconsin	Confederated Tribes and Bands of the Yakama Nation, Washington	Fort Sill Apache Tribe of Oklahoma	Fort Sill Apache Tribe	
	Confederated Tribes of the Chehalis Reservation, Washington	Hoopa Valley Tribe of California	Iowa Tribe of Oklahoma		
	White Mountain Apache Tribe, Arizona	Coushatta Tribe of Louisiana	Karuk Tribe of California		
	Yomba Shoshone Tribe, Nevada	Forest County Potawatomi Community, Wisconsin	Klamath Tribes, Oregon		
		Ho-Chunk Nation of Wisconsin	Muckleshoot Indian Tribe of the Muckleshoot Reservation, Washington		
		Hopi Tribe of Arizona	Northwestern Band of Shoshoni Nation of Utah (Washakie)		
		Keweenaw Bay Indian Community, Michigan	Otoe-Missouria Tribe of Indians, Oklahoma		
		Kickapoo Traditional Tribe of Texas	Pawnee Nation of Oklahoma		
		Kickapoo Tribe of Oklahoma, Oklahoma	Ponca Nation, Oklahoma		
		Kiowa Tribe of Oklahoma	Sac and Fox Nation, Oklahoma		
		Fort McDowell Yavapai Nation, Arizona	Sac & Fox Nation of Missouri in Kansas and Nebraska		
		Fort Peck Assiniboine and Sioux Tribes, Montana	Squaxin Island Tribe of the Squaxin Island Reservation, Washington		
		Lac du Flambeau Band of Lake Superior Chippewa, Wisconsin	Three Affiliated Tribes of the Fort Berthold Reservation		
		Laguna Pueblo, New Mexico	Upper Skagit Indian Tribe of Washington		
		Menominee Nation of Wisconsin	Yurok Tribe of California		
		Mohawk Tribe, New York and Ontario/Quebec, Canada			
		Navajo Nation, Arizona, Utah and New Mexico			
		Oneida Indian Nation, Wisconsin			
		Pascua Yaqui Tribe, Arizona			
		Passamaquoddy Tribe, Maine			
		Penobscot Tribe, Maine			
		Poarch Band of Creek Indians, Alabama			
		Prairie Band Potawatomi Nation, Kansas			
		Seminole Tribe of Florida			
		Shoshone Tribe of the Wind River Reservation, Wyoming			
		Spokane Tribe of Indians, Idaho and Washington			
		Standing Rock Sioux Tribe, North and South Dakota			
		Turtle Mountain Band of Chippewa, North Dakota			
		United Keetoowah Band of Cherokee Indians, Oklahoma			
		Utu Utu Gwaitu Paiute Tribe, California			
		Yavapai-Prescott Tribe, Arizona			
		Zuni Pueblo (Ashiwi), New Mexico			

=== Tribes determining membership by both blood quantum and lineal descent ===
These tribes require both a specified blood quantum and lineal descent from an individual on a designated tribal roll.

- Confederated Tribes of the Umatilla Indian Reservation – Since 1993, have required 1/4 descent from any federally recognized Native American tribe, plus being the biological child or grandchild of an already-enrolled member.
- Grand Traverse Band of Ottawa and Chippewa Indians
- Little Traverse Bay Bands of Odawa Indians
- Little River Band of Ottawa Indians
- Poarch Band of Creek Indians

== Other examples ==
The U.S Territory of American Samoa restricts the alienation of non-freehold land to any person who has less than one-half native blood. "'Native' means a full-blooded Samoan person of Tutuila, Manu'a, Aunu'u, or Swains Island."

== Similar usage ==
In Australia, the racial laws inflicted on the Stolen Generations have been compared to blood quantum laws, as mixed-race Indigenous Australian children were removed from their families to biologically absorb them into the white population under the assumption that full-blooded individuals were doomed to extinction.

== See also ==
- Castizo, in colonial Hispano-America, a person of 3/4 White (usually Spanish) ancestry and 1/4 Native ancestry
- Dawes Act (1887)
- Dawes Rolls
- Impact of Native American gaming
- Indian Register – the list of First Nations Canadians who are eligible for treaty benefits
- Kamehameha Schools Admission Policy, Hawaii
- Multiracial Americans
- Native American genealogy
- Native American identity in the United States
- Native American reservation politics
- Native American self-determination
- Native American tribal rolls
- One-drop rule
- Quadroon
- Tribal disenrollment
- Tribal sovereignty
- Walter Plecker
