= Indigenous identity fraud in Canada and the United States =

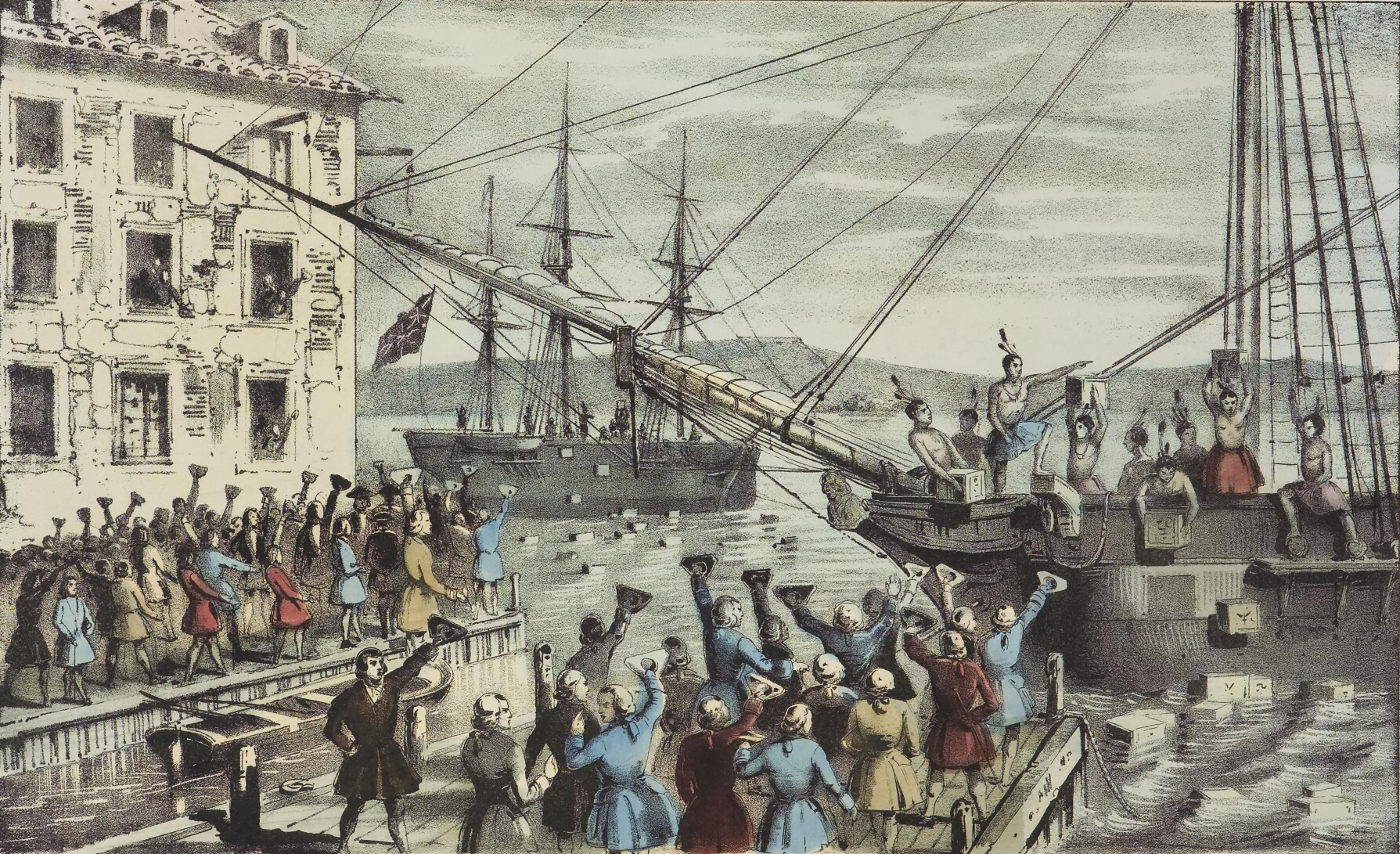
The Sons of Liberty protestors dressed up as Native Americans in the 1773 Boston Tea Party

Indigenous identity fraud is the practice of non-Indigenous people incorrectly claiming Indigenous identity. The Indigenous Chamber of Commerce states, "For Indigenous peoples, identity is not a self-declared label but is instead grounded in ancestry, kinship, community recognition, and lived experience, among other things." Indigenous identity fraud also refers to an individual who makes such incorrect claims.

Individuals who practice Indigenous identity fraud are often called "pretendians", a pejorative portmanteau of "pretend" and "Indian"; similarly a "pretenduit" is a portmanteau of "pretend" and "Inuit". Philip Deloria (Standing Rock Sioux) called the practice "playing Indian," and anthropologist Circe Sturm coined the term "race shifting". Indigenous identity fraud is considered an extreme form of cultural misappropriation, especially if that individual then asserts that they can represent, and speak for, communities from which they do not originate.

Early false claims to Native identity date back at least as far as the Boston Tea Party. According to the Oklahoma Historical Society, the Dawes Commission was "bombarded with fraudulent applicants from across the US trying to secure an allotment" during the creation of the Dawes Rolls. The Guion Miller Roll, which determined eligibility for financial restitution to Eastern Cherokee people for treaty violations, was also inundated with applications, two-thirds of which were rejected as fraudulent. Fraud in Native American art was so common that the U.S. federal government had to pass the Indian Arts and Crafts Act of 1935, which created a $2,000 fine or six months in prison for selling goods falsely claimed to be American Indian-made. States and tribes later passed their own Indian arts and crafts laws. Indigenous identity fraud increased after the 1960s for several reasons, such as the reestablishment of tribal sovereignty following the era of Indian termination policy, the media coverage of the Occupation of Alcatraz and the Wounded Knee Occupation, and the formation of Native American studies as a distinct form of area studies which led to the establishment of publishing programs and university departments specifically for or about Native American culture. At the same time, hippie and New Age subcultures marketed Native cultures as accessible, spiritual, and as a form of resistance to mainstream culture, leading to the rise of the plastic shaman or "culture vulture". By 1990, many years of pushback by Native Americans against Indigenous identity fraud resulted in the successful passage of the Indian Arts and Crafts Act of 1990 (IACA) – a truth-in-advertising law which prohibits misrepresentation in marketing of American Indian or Alaska Native arts and crafts products within the United States. Indian arts and crafts laws have also been enacted by some states and tribes.

While Native communities have always self-policed and spread word of frauds, mainstream media and arts communities were often unaware, or did not act upon this information, until more recent decades. Since the 1990s and 2000s, a number of controversies regarding ethnic fraud have come to light and received coverage in mainstream media, leading to a broader awareness of pretendians in the world at large.

== History of false claims to Indigenous identity ==
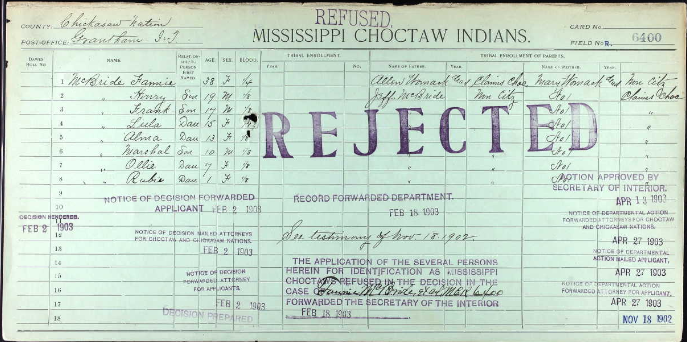
Rejected application for citizenship in the Mississippi Band of Choctaw Indians, 1903.

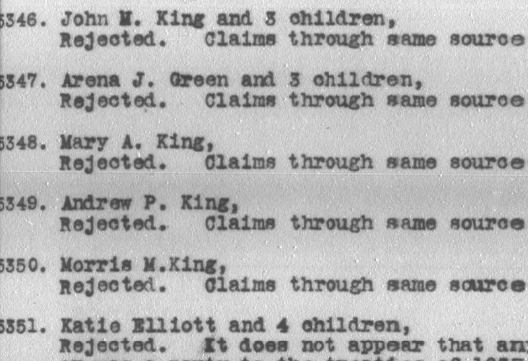
Rejected applications for the Guion Miller Roll.

=== Early claims ===
Historian Philip J. Deloria has noted that European Americans "playing Indian" is a phenomenon that stretches back at least as far as the Boston Tea Party.

In his 1998 book Playing Indian, Deloria argues that white settlers have always played with stereotypical imagery of the peoples that were replaced during colonization, using these tropes to form a new national identity that can be seen as distinct from previous European identities. Early examples of white people playing Indian include, according to Deloria, the Improved Order of Red Men, Tammany Hall, and scouting societies like the Order of the Arrow.

Individuals who made careers out of pretending an Indigenous identity include James Beckwourth, Chief Buffalo Child Long Lance, and Grey Owl.

The academic Joel W. Martin noted that "an astonishing number of southerners assert they have a grandmother or great-grandmother who was some kind of Cherokee, often a princess", and that such myths serve settler purposes in aligning American frontier romance with southern regionalism and pride.

=== Post-1960s: Rise of Indigenous identity fraud in academia, arts, and political positions ===
Several factors influenced the rise of Indigenous identity fraud after the 1960s. The reestablishment and exercise of tribal sovereignty among tribal nations (following the era of Indian termination policy) meant that many individuals raised away from tribal communities sought, and still seek, to reestablish their status as tribal citizens or to recover connections to tribal traditions. Other tribal citizens, who had been raised in American Indian boarding schools under genocidal policies designed to erase their cultural identity, also revived tribal religious and cultural practices.

At the same time, in the years following the Occupation of Alcatraz, the formation of Native American studies as a distinct form of area studies, and the awarding of the Pulitzer Prize for Fiction to Kiowa author N. Scott Momaday, publishing programs and university departments began to be established specifically for or about Native American culture. At the same time, hippie and New Age cultures marketed Native cultures as accessible, spiritual, and as a form of resistance to mainstream culture, leading to the rise of the plastic shaman or "culture vulture". All of this added up to a culture that was not inclined to disbelieve self-identification, and a wider societal impulse to claim Indigeneity.

Elizabeth Cook-Lynn wrote of the influence of Indigenous identity frauds in American academia and political positions:

[U]nscrupulous scholars in the discipline who had no stake in Native nationhood but who had achieved status in academia and held on to it through fraudulent claims to Indian Nation heritage and blood directed the discourse. This phenomenon took place following the "Indian Preference" regulations in new hiring practices at the Bureau of Indian Affairs in the early 1970s. Sometimes unprepared for such outright aggression or suffering polarization from the conflicts in the system, Native scholars in the academy often seemed to be silent witnesses to such occurrences. Their silence has not meant complicity. It has meant, more than anything, a feeling of utter powerlessness within the structures of strong mainstream institutions.

By 1990, as noted in The New York Times Magazine, many years of "significant pushback by Native Americans against so-called Pretendians or Pretend Indians" resulted in the successful passage of the Indian Arts and Crafts Act of 1990 (IACA) – a truth-in-advertising law which prohibits misrepresentation in the marketing of American Indian or Alaska Natives arts and crafts products within the United States. The IACA makes it illegal for non-Natives to offer or display for sale, or sell, any art or craft product in a manner that falsely suggests it is Indian produced, an Indian product, or the product of a particular Indian, Indian tribe, or Indian arts and crafts organization. For a first-time violation of the act, an individual can face civil or criminal penalties up to a $250,000 fine or a five-year prison term, or both. If a business violates the act, it can face civil penalties or can be prosecuted and fined up to $1,000,000.

== Contemporary controversies: 21st century ==
United States Poet Laureate Joy Harjo (Mvskoke) writes:

We ... have had to contend with an onslaught of what we call 'Pretendians', that is, non-Indigenous people assuming a Native identity. DNA tests are setting up other problems involving those who discover Native DNA [sic] in their bloodline. When individuals assert themselves as Native when they are not culturally Indigenous, and if they do not understand their tribal nation's history or participate in their tribal nation's society, who benefits? Not the people or communities of the identity being claimed. It is hard to see this as anything other than an individual's capitalist claim, just another version of a colonial offense.

While modern DNA testing can confirm some degree of Native American ancestry, as well as family relatedness, it is less able to indicate tribal belonging or Native American identity, which is based on culture as well as biology. Attempts by non-Natives to racialize Indigenous identity through DNA tests have been seen by some Indigenous people, such as Kim TallBear, as insensitive at best, though often racist, politically and financially motivated, and dangerous to the survival of Indigenous cultures. (Note: While there are some genetic markers that are more common among Native Americans, these markers are also found in Asia, and in other parts of the world. The commercial DNA companies that offer ethnicity tests do not have a large enough pool of North American DNA to provide reliable matches. The most popular companies have admitted to having no North American DNA, and that their "matches" are to Central Asian and South or Central American populations; smaller companies may have a very small pool from one tribe who participated in a medical study. The exploitation of Indigenous genetic material, like the theft of human remains, land and artifacts, has led to widespread distrust to outright boycotts of these companies by Native communities. While a DNA test may bring up some markers associated with some Indigenous or Asian populations (and the science there is fairly problematic, as TallBear describes in her book Native American DNA), as Indigenous identity is based in citizenship, family and community, a genetic marker does not make a person Indigenous.)

While Indigenous communities have always self-policed and spread word of frauds, mainstream media and arts communities were often unaware or did not act upon this information, until recent decades. However, since the 1990s and 2000s, a number of controversies regarding ethnic fraud have come to light and received coverage in mainstream media, leading to a broader awareness of Indigenous identity fraud in the world at large.

In April 2018, APTN National News in Canada investigated how Indigenous identity frauds – in the film industry and in real life – promote "stereotypes, typecasting, and even, what is known as 'redface'." Rebecca Nagle (Cherokee Nation) voiced a similar position in 2019, writing for High Country News that:

Pretendians perpetuate the myth that Native identity is determined by the individual, not the tribe or community, directly undermining tribal sovereignty and Native self-determination. To protect the rights of Indigenous people, pretendians like Wages and Warren must be challenged and the retelling of their false narratives must be stopped.

=== Controversies in media ===
On September 13, 2021, the CBC News reported on their ongoing investigation into a "mysterious letter", dated 1845 (but never seen before 2011) that is now believed to be a forgery. Based solely on the one ancestor listed in this letter, over 1,000 people were enrolled as Algonquin people, making them "potential beneficiaries of a massive pending land claim agreement involving almost $1 billion and more than 500 sq. kilometres of land". The CBC investigation used handwriting analysis, and other methods of archival and historical evaluation to conclude the letter is a fake. This has led to the federally recognized Pikwakanagan First Nation to renew efforts to remove these "pretendian" claimants from their membership. In a statement to CBC News, the chief and council of the Algonquins of Pikwakanagan First Nation say that those they are seeking to remove "are fraudulently taking up Indigenous spaces in high academia and procurement opportunities".

In October 2021, the CBC published an investigation into the status of Canadian academic Carrie Bourassa, who works as an Indigenous health expert and has claimed Métis, Anishinaabe and Tlingit status. Research into her claims indicated that her ancestry is wholly European. In particular, the great-grandmother she claimed was Tlingit, Johanna Salaba, is well-documented as having emigrated from Russia in 1911; she was a Czech-speaking Russian. In response, Bourassa admitted that she does not have status in the communities that she claimed but insisted that she does have some Indigenous ancestors and that she has hired other genealogists to search for them. Bourassa was placed on immediate leave from her post at the Canadian Institutes of Health Research after her claims of Indigenous ancestry were found to be baseless.

In November 2021, writing for the Toronto Star about the Bourassa situation as well as the actions of Joseph Boyden and Michelle Latimer, K. J. McCusker wrote:

Stolen identities undermine us to the point where we end up fodder for the tabloids the likes of Daily Mail. We become a spectacle for those who at best think of us as a Halloween costume idea. To people like Bourassa, we are indeed a costume, except one you get to wear all year long and benefit from professionally because it checks that box that was created to even-out the field that cannot ever be evened out just by a box.

In October 2022, Macleans magazine published a detailed article that elaborated on Carrie Bourassa, in addition to a detailed look at Gina Adams. The article also discusses the questioned identities of Amie Wolf, Cheyanne Turions, and Michelle Latimer.

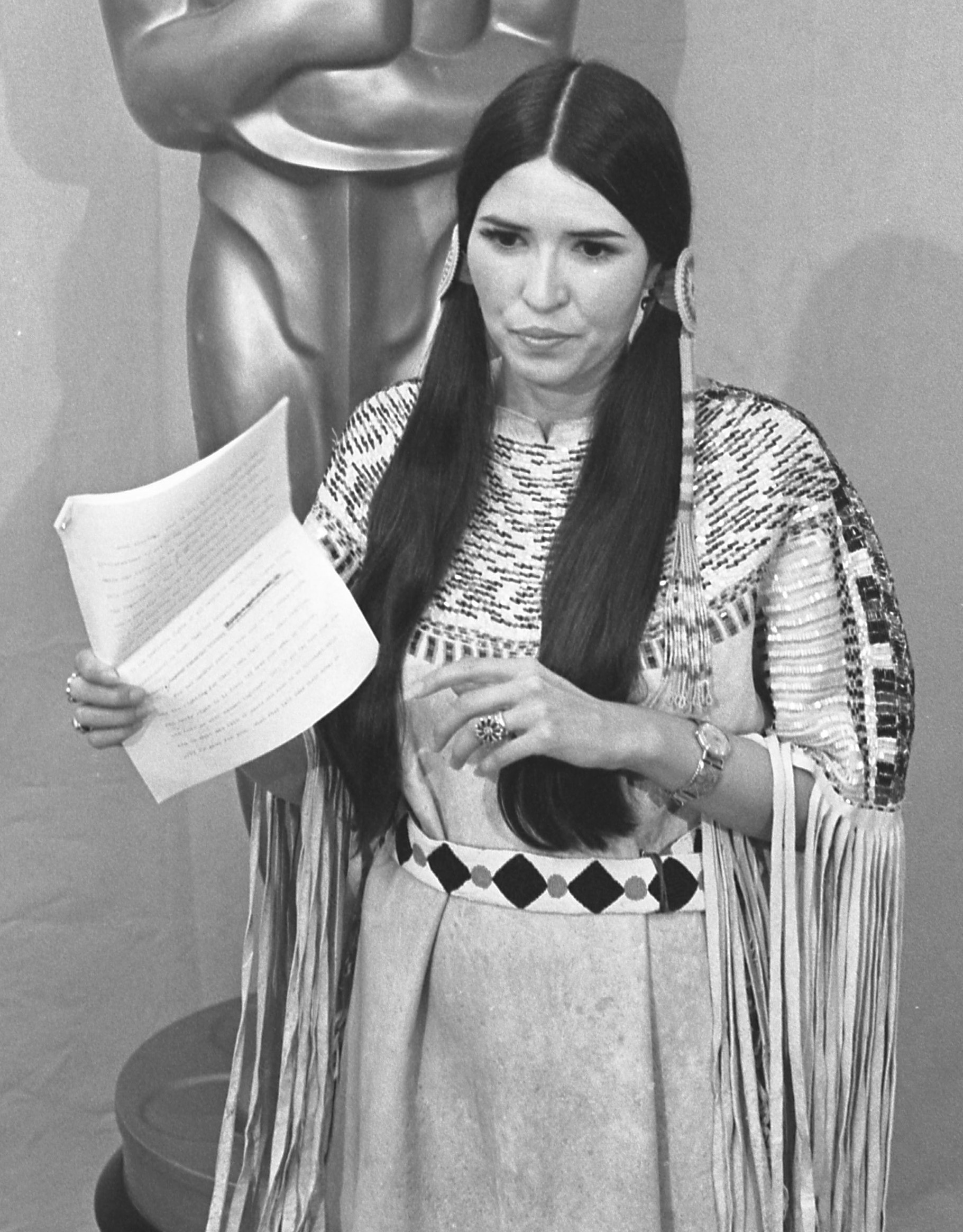
Sacheen Littlefeather at the 45th Academy Awards in 1973, which she attended on behalf of Marlon Brando

In October 2022, actor and activist Sacheen Littlefeather died. Shortly thereafter her sisters spoke to Navajo reporter Jacqueline Keeler and said that their family has no ties to the Apache or Yaqui tribes Sacheen had claimed. As Littlefeather had been a beloved activist, these reports were met with controversy, challenges, and attacks on Keeler, largely on social media. Academic Dina Gilio-Whitaker (Colville Confederated Tribes descent) wrote that the truth about community leaders is "crucial", even if it means losing a "hero", and that the work Littlefeather did is still valuable, but there is a need to be honest about the harm done by Indigenous identity frauds, especially by those who manage to fool so many people that they become iconic:

The stereotype Littlefeather embodied depended on non-Native people not knowing what they were looking at, or knowing what constitutes legitimate American Indian identity. There is a pattern that "pretendians" follow: They exploit people's lack of knowledge about who American Indian people are by perpetuating ambiguity in a number of ways. Self-identification, or even DNA tests, for instance, obscure the fact that American Indians have not only a cultural relationship to a specific tribe and the United States but a legal one. Pretendians rarely can name any people they are related to in a Native community or in their family tree. They also just blatantly lie. Pretendianism is particularly prevalent in entertainment, publishing and academia. [...] Harm is caused when resources and even jobs go to fakes instead of the people they were intended for.

== Motivating factors ==
There are several possible explanations for why non-Indigenous people adopt false Indigenous identities. Mnikȟówožu Lakota poet Trevino Brings Plenty writes: "To wear an underrepresented people's skin is enticing. I get it: to feast on struggle, to explore imagined roots; to lay the foundational work for academic jobs and publishing opportunities." Helen Lewis wrote in The Atlantic that perhaps personal trauma from unrelated events in their lives, such as a difficult upbringing, may motivate hoaxers to desire to be publicly perceived as victims of oppression – to identify with those they see as victims rather than the perpetrators.

Patrick Wolfe argues that the problem is more structural, stating that settler colonial ideology actively needs to erase and then reproduce Indigenous identity in order to create and justify claims to land and territory. Deloria also explores the white American dual fascination with "the vanishing Indian" and the idea that by "Playing Indian", the white man can then be the true inheritor and preserver of authentic American identity and connection to the land, aka "Indianness".

Academics Kim TallBear (Sisseton Wahpeton Oyate), Dina Gilio-Whitaker (Colville descent), Rowland Robinson (Menominee), as well as journalist Jacqueline Keeler (Navajo Nation) and attorney Jean Teillet (great-grandniece of Louis Riel) also name white supremacy, in addition to ongoing settler colonialism, as core factors in the phenomenon. In Settler Colonialism + Native Ghosts – "Community, Pretendians, & Heartbreak", Robinson posits that:

Quite often this seems to be a cynical ploy towards some kind of anti-Indigenous political programme, as Darryl Leroux and others have demonstrated quite convincingly and handily regarding the explosion of groups in eastern Ontario, Québec, the Maritimes, and parts of New England (2019) where quite often the absolutely astronomical growth in new claimants of Indigeneity can be clearly traced back to white supremacist, anti-Native, political projects in opposition to Aboriginal and Treaty rights. The assumption of Indigenous identity, through the growth of the so-called "Eastern Métis" movement, is clearly, at least in terms of its foundational leadership and organizational nature, antagonistic at a fundamental level towards Indigenous peoples and livelihoods.

In October 2022, Teillet published the report, Indigenous Identity Fraud, for the University of Saskatchewan. Discussing her research, she wrote for the Globe and Mail:

Who are these people? In the academy and government, they are mostly white women. In the hunting and fishing realm, they are mostly white men. ... What these claims have in common is that they are entirely disconnected from any living Indigenous people.

Why do they do it? Indigenous impersonation is not an accident. People do it to get something they want – to stop Indigenous people from closing a land claim, to access hunting and fishing rights, or to gain access to jobs. And the payoff is well worth it. Imposters in the academy gain six-figure jobs, prestige, grants and tenure in exchange for a few lies. This kind of impersonation can only be carried out by those with immense privilege. It takes a person with enough knowledge of the gaps in the system to exploit them. It is also another colonial act. If colonialism has not eradicated Indigenous people by starvation, residential schools, the reserve system, taking their lands and languages, scooping their children, and doing everything to assimilate Indigenous peoples, then the final act is to become them. It's a perverse kind of reverse assimilation.

Jordan Molot of Concordia University, citing the sociologist Megan Scribe, has written that "settler moves to indigeneity" are common in multiple settler-colonial societies, perceiving a commonality between Indigenous "ethnic fraud" in North America and "Zionist claims of indigeneity in Israel".

== Laws and consequences ==
Indigenous identity fraud has been such a problem in Native American arts that the US Indian Arts and Crafts Act of 1935 outlawed the sale of arts and crafts not made by American Indians or Alaska Natives as "Indian products or Indian products of a particular Indian tribe or group, resident within the United States or the Territory of Alaska". Penalities included imprisonment and criminal fines. Thirteen states and several Native American tribes passed their own Indian arts and crafts laws.

Activism by Native American artists and policymakers resulted in the Indian Arts and Crafts Act of 1990 made the fraudulent sale of non-Native arts and crafts a felony, with criminal fines up to $250,000 for individuals and prison sentences up to five-years.

=== 2024 fraud charges ===
In Canada in 2024, Karima Manji and her twin daughters Nadya and Amira Gill, who are non-Indigenous, were charged with defrauding the Nunavut government of over $150,000 by claiming Inuit identity to receive financial aid earmarked for Indigenous. Manji took full responsibility for the Inuit misrepresentation and was sentenced to three years in prison, while charges against her daughters were dropped; Nunavut Tunngavik Incorporated (NTI) has called this "unacceptable" since her daughters benefited from the fraud. Her daughters had earlier been dismissed from their jobs at law and engineering firms. Manji had previously been convicted in 2016 of defrauding the March of Dimes Canada charity of $800,000 and received a conditional sentence.

=== Pilot project ===
In Canada in 2024, the government funding Tri-agency (including the NSERC, SSHRC, and CIHR) announced an 8-month pilot project to ensure that grants, awards, and jobs intended for Indigenous people go to those that are genuinely Indigenous.

== Examples ==
Individuals who have been accused of committing Indigenous identity fraud include:

=== Academic ===
- Ward Churchill (1947–2026) – A professor of ethnic studies and political activist, Churchill built his career on his claims of Indigenous identity. Those claims were not supported by membership in any tribe or by later genealogical research.
- Elizabeth Hoover (born 1978) – University of California Berkeley professor and Native food sovereignty activist with documented childhood identification as Native and involvement within Native culture. Following questions about her ancestry, Hoover conducted her own family genealogical research. She then announced in 2022 that she was not Native American, adding that she had been mistaken about her ancestry. Hoover did not resign from her university position.
- Julie Nagam – Curator and art historian claiming Metis blood while teaching at the University of Winnipeg (and raising over $18M in Indigenous research grants). Nagam was revealed to have no Indigenous heritage.
- Andrea Smith – Smith built a career as a scholar, author and activist based on her claim that she is a Cherokee woman. Despite many articles and statements by Cherokee people and genealogists stating she has no Cherokee heritage or citizenship, she has never retracted her claim. Smith was a professor in the Department of Ethnic Studies at University of California, Riverside. In August 2023, the university announced that she would resign her post as an emerita professor in August 2024 due to charges that she "made fraudulent claims to Native American identity in violation of the Faculty Code of Conduct provisions concerning academic integrity".
- Vianne Timmons (born 1958) – President of Memorial University of Newfoundland who claimed membership in controversial Bras d'Or Mi'kmaq First Nation.
- Mary Ellen Turpel-Lafond (born 1963) – A lawyer, academic, and former judge, for whom false claims to Indigenous ancestry were alleged by the Canadian Broadcasting Corporation in 2022. She was dismissed from a university faculty position, and various honors and awards that she had received were revoked or relinquished, including all her 11 honorary degrees and the Order of Canada. However, in 2024, the Law Society of British Columbia released a report which stated that DNA analysis indicated that Turpell-Lafond most likely had recent Indigenous ancestry, while confirming she had made numerous "mischaracterizations" in her credentials. The DNA analysis referred to in the report was obtained by Turpel-Lafond's attorney and was not made publicly available.

=== Film, television, and music ===
- Mona Darkfeather (1882–1977)
- Cher (1948-) - Singer, actress self-promoted in her popular song "Half-Breed". Her Indigenous ancestry has since been debunked.
- Chief Thundercloud (1899–1955)

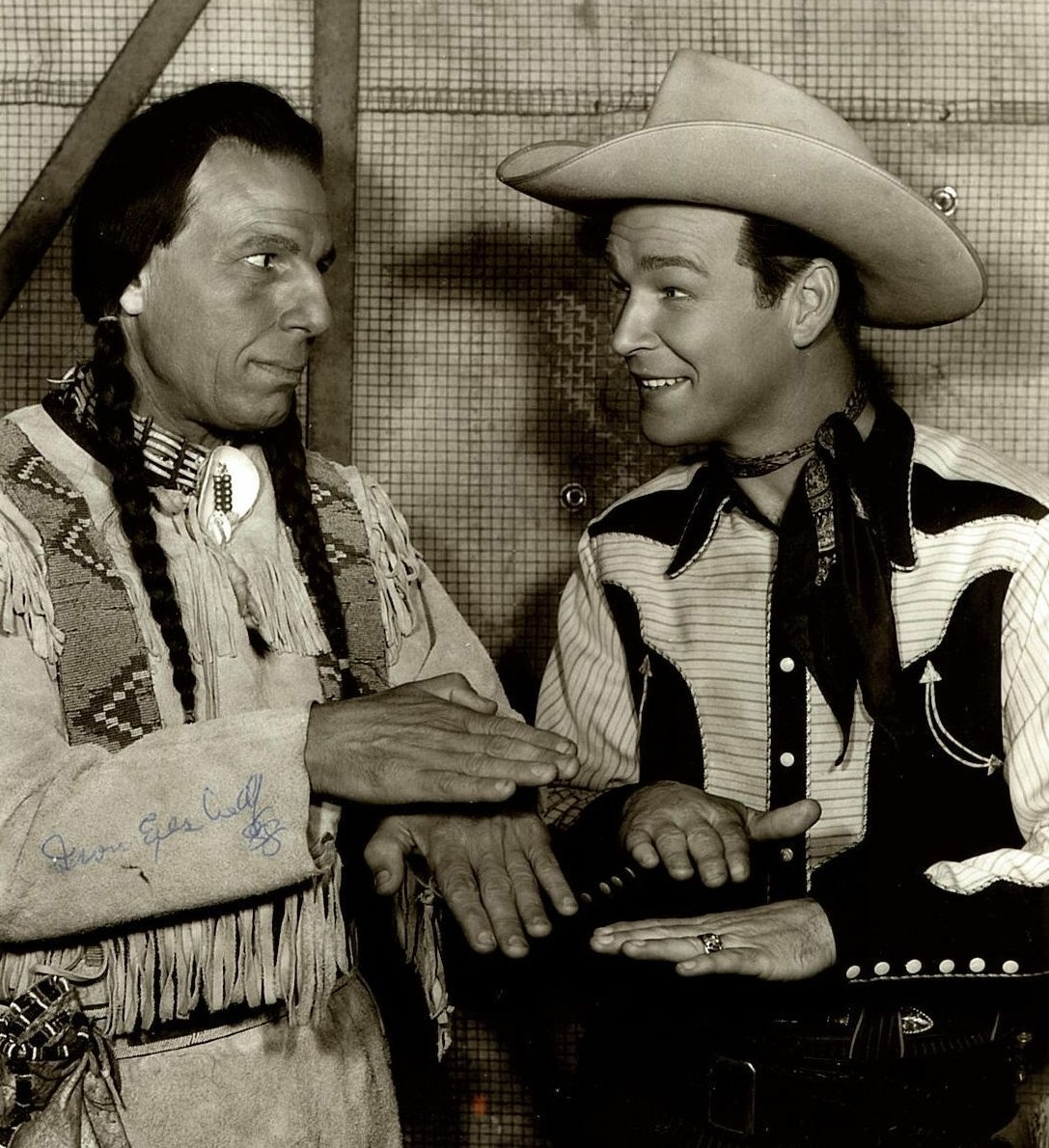
Iron Eyes Cody and Roy Rogers in North of the Great Divide, 1950

- "Iron Eyes" Cody (1904–1999) – Born Espera Oscar de Corti, and later becoming known as "The Crying Indian," this Italian-American actor is most well known for his appearance in a 1970's anti-littering PSA. Cody pretended to be from various tribes and denied his Italian heritage for the rest of his life.
- Johnny Depp (born 1963) – This actor has claimed both Creek and Cherokee descent on numerous occasions, including when cast as Tonto in the 2013 film The Lone Ranger, but has no documented Native ancestry, is not a citizen in any tribe, and is regarded as "a non-Indian" and a "pretendian" by Native leaders. During the promotion for The Lone Ranger LaDonna Harris, a member of the Comanche Nation, adopted Depp, making him her honorary son, but not a member of any tribe.
- Michelle Latimer – Canadian actress and film director whose claims of Indigenous ancestry and tribal membership have been questioned by the CBC, the Globe and Mail and other media. Latimer has said that her identification as Indigenous rested on the oral history of her maternal grandfather. A previously commissioned show was cancelled by CBC after Latimer's misrepresentations were made public. Latimer later produced genealogical records to bolster her claim that she was a 'non-status Algonquin'; these claims were rejected by tribal leaders. However, one genealogical researcher has found that Latimer had two Indigenous ancestors dating from 1644, while others have found that Latimer has Indigenous ancestry from both her paternal and maternal lines that originate from a "historical community of Baskatong that was known for its Algonquin and Métis population." In 2020, Latimer apologized for having claimed historical roots to the Kitigan Zibi community.
- Sacheen Littlefeather (1946–2022) – Born Maria Louise Cruz, this actress took the stage in Plains-style attire at the Academy Awards to decline the 1972 Best Actor award on behalf of Marlon Brando for The Godfather, on being hired by him to do so and advocate for Native American rights. Subsequently presenting herself throughout her life as a White Mountain Apache and Yaqui as she had portrayed on-stage, who had grown up in a hovel without a toilet, her sisters and others later said her father was a Mexican-American of Spanish descent with no known ancestors who had a tribal identity in Mexico, while her mother was of French, German, and Dutch descent. An investigation by the Navajo writer-activist Jacqueline Keeler and her team, and reviewed by academics prior to publication, revealed no apparent ties to any tribe in the United States.
- Heather Rae (born 1966) – Born Heather Rae Bybee, having falsely claimed to be Cherokee, Rae became a prominent producer in Hollywood. She ran the Indigenous program at the Sundance Institute from 1996 to 2001, producing a number of projects centered around Native American experiences including the Oscar-nominated Frozen River (2008). She serves on the Academy of Motion Pictures' Indigenous alliance, which "recognizes self-identification" for Native American identity. She has supported the casting of pretendians in Native roles as well as leading the charge for an apology by the Academy to fellow pretendian Sacheen Littlefeather. She is an adviser for IllumiNative, which says they are a "Native woman-led racial and social justice organization dedicated to increasing the visibility of—and challenging the narrative about—Native peoples". The Cherokee Nation has stated that Rae is not a citizen of their nation and she did not receive funding for the film Fancy Dance (2023), which they funded. Research by the Tribal Alliance Against Frauds into her public family records shows that Rae's family identified as white across multiple records and no documented ties to a tribal community.
- Buffy Sainte-Marie (born 1941) – Born Beverly Jean Santamaria, Sainte-Marie is an American musician who has said since 1963 that she has Cree Indigenous Canadian roots. A 2023 investigation by CBC News featured her birth certificate, which stated that she had been born in Stoneham, Massachusetts of European ancestry and that the couple who she had asserted were her adoptive parents were in fact her biological parents. In the 1960s, she had performed at a powwow and falsely claimed that she might be the long-lost daughter of a Piapot First Nation family; a couple she met there then adopted her into their family and still claim her to this day. For about 60 years, she built a career in part on her claimed Canadian and Native heritage. She was introduced as a regular character on the Sesame Street television series in 1975, at which time she stated that "Cree Indians are my tribe, and we live in Canada". The CBC investigation concluded that "her account of her ancestry has been a shifting narrative, full of inconsistencies and inaccuracies".

=== Literary ===
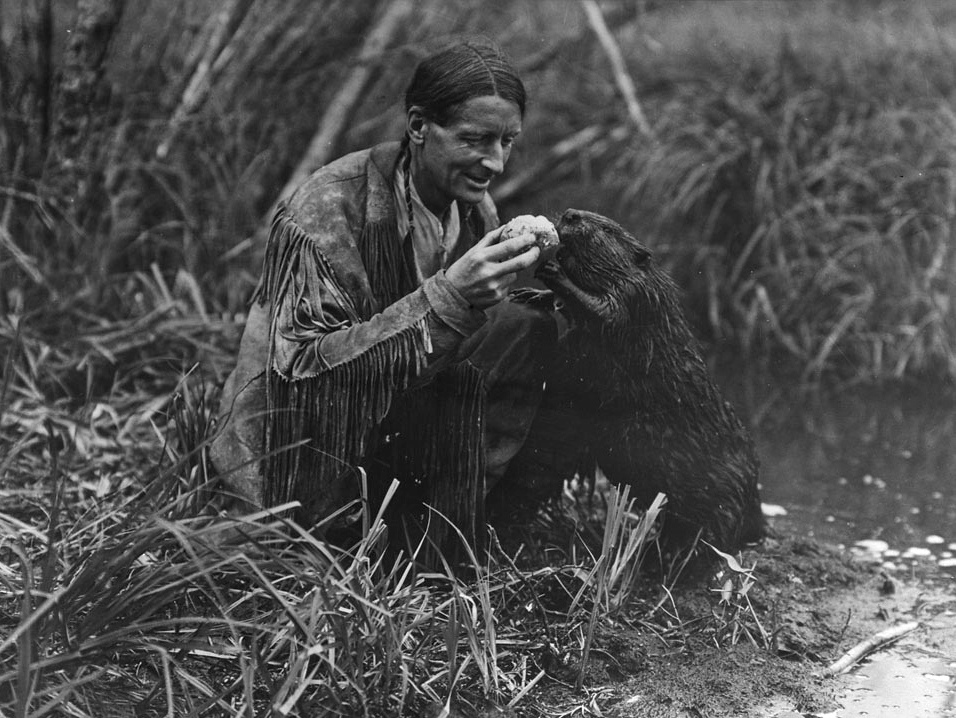
Grey Owl (Archibald Stansfeld Belaney) feeding a Swiss roll to a beaver

- Joseph Boyden (born 1966) – A Canadian novelist, Boyden has claimed Mi'kmaq, Métis, Nipmuc, and Ojibway heritage. He registered with the Ontario Métis Aboriginal Association, also known as the Woodland Métis Tribe. In January 2017, Boyden said he had erroneously identified himself as Mi'kmaq in the past and that he was a "white kid with native roots".
- Asa Earl Carter (1925–1979) – Published using the pseudonym Forrest Carter as a supposed Cherokee. The founder of a Ku Klux Klan paramilitary group and a white supremacist politician under his birth name, he used his pseudonym to write popular books including The Rebel Outlaw: Josey Wales and The Education of Little Tree. Also known for co-authoring George Wallace's tagline, "Segregation now, segregation tomorrow, segregation forever".
- Grey Owl (1888–1938) – An Englishman born as Archibald Stansfeld Belaney who became a woodsman and wrote books and gave lectures as an activist primarily on environmental and conservationism issues, but was exposed after his death as having falsely claimed his Indigenous identity.
- Roxy Gordon (1945–2000) – an American writer and musician who identified as being of white, Choctaw, and Assiniboine ancestry. A report from Texas Monthly alleged that he was a pretendian, concluding that he had no Native American heritage. The Choctaw Nation of Oklahoma has stated that Gordon was not enrolled with the tribe. Gordon's son John Calvin has stated that he has found no evidence that his father had Choctaw heritage.
- Jamake Highwater (1931–2001) – A prolific American writer and journalist born as Jackie Marks who passed as Cherokee and used Native American culture as his writing theme, although he was actually of eastern European Jewish ancestry.
- Thomas King (born 1943), writer, professor of Indigenous studies, revealed no Indigenous ancestry after claiming Cherokee roots for decades.
- Chief Buffalo Child Long Lance (1890–1932) – The persona of the African-American journalist, writer, and film actor Sylvester Clark Long, who falsely claimed Blackfoot and Cherokee heritage.
- Brooke Medicine Eagle (born 1943) – the pseudonym of Brooke Edwards, an American author, singer-songwriter, and teacher specializing in a New Age interpretation of Native American religion.
- Nasdijj (born 1950) – The pseudonym of writer Tim Barrus, an American author and social worker best known for having published three "memoirs" between 2000 and 2004 while presenting himself as a Navajo.
- Red Thunder Cloud (1919–1996) – Born Cromwell Ashbie Hawkins West, also known as Carlos Westez, a singer, dancer, storyteller, and field researcher who was promoted as the last fluent speaker of the Catawba language, but was later revealed to have learned what little he knew of the language from books and to have been of African American heritage.
- Sat-Okh (1920–2003), also known as Stanisław Supłatowicz, was a writer, artist, and soldier who served during World War II, who claimed to be of Polish and Shawnee descent. His origins were heavily disputed.
- Margaret Seltzer (born 1975) – The writer of a "memoir" of her supposed experiences as a half–Native American foster child and gang member in South Central Los Angeles was later revealed to have completely fabricated the story after growing up in an affluent neighborhood with no Native American background or heritage.

=== Political ===
- Kaya Jones (born 1984) – A singer and model who joined the National Diversity Coalition for Trump as their "Native American Ambassador"; she falsely claimed to be Apache.
- Kevin Klein – Manitoba politician whose ongoing claims of Métis ancestry were debunked in a July 31, 2023 piece by the CBC.
- Sherri Rollins - Winnipeg City Councillor claiming contemporary Indigeneity allegedly from an ancestor 300 years ago.
- Danielle Smith (born 1971) – Premier of Alberta who claimed to have a Cherokee great-great-grandmother who was a victim of the Trail of Tears. An investigation from APTN National News found no evidence that Smith's ancestors were Indigenous or victims of the Trail of Tears.
- Elizabeth Warren (born 1949) – A U.S. Senator and presidential candidate who said she grew up believing she had Cherokee and Delaware ancestry due to family members saying so, and then claimed such heritage publicly. After her heritage was called into question, she attempted to support her claim by releasing a video with DNA analysis, but her DNA claims were rejected by the Cherokee Nation, which formally requires a documented lineage. Then-Cherokee Nation Secretary of State Chuck Hoskin Jr. (who became Principal Chief of the Nation in the following year) commented, "Using a DNA test to lay claim to any connection to the Cherokee Nation or any tribal nation, even vaguely, is inappropriate and wrong". Warren was listed as a Native American minority in a faculty directory at Harvard and had been lauded as the first tenured professor with a minority background by The Crimson. She was also listed as a Native American in the faculty directory at the University of Pennsylvania. Warren eventually expressed regret and apologized for "claiming American Indian heritage".

=== Visual arts ===
- Gina Adams (born 1965) – A visual artist and assistant professor at Emily Carr University, Adams claims White Earth Ojibwe and Lakota ancestry, and that her grandfather lived on the White Earth Indian Reservation and was removed at age eight to attend Carlisle Indian Industrial School, which closed in 1918. Genealogists reported that Adams' grandfather "was a white man named Albert Theriault, who was born in Massachusetts to French-Canadian parents." Adams has also claimed that her great-great-grandfather was Ojibwe chief Wabanquot (1830–1898), a signer of the 1867 federal treaty with the Chippewa of the Mississippi. She has shown no evidence supporting any of these claims. She claims to be only a descendant, not an enrolled tribal member, so she and her gallery have so far successfully evaded the US Indian Arts and Crafts Act of 1990.
- Jimmie Durham (1940–2021) – An artist and activist who claimed one-quarter Cherokee descent by blood and to have grown up in a Cherokee-speaking community, Durham exhibited his work in the U.S. as Native American art until the 1990 passage of the Indian Arts and Crafts Act (which prohibits false claims of Native production of arts and crafts that are offered for sale). He subsequently left the United States and continued to falsely claim Cherokee status in European exhibitions. He had formerly been an organizer and central committee member for the American Indian Movement, and worked as the chief administrator for the International Indian Treaty Council. He was found to have "no known ties to any Cherokee community" and to be "neither enrolled nor eligible for citizenship" in any of the three federally recognized Cherokee tribes.
- Yeffe Kimball (1906–1978) – An artist who claimed to be Osage. Born Effie Goodman, under her assumed identity she made art that she misrepresented as Native American, and also engaged in Native American political activism.
- Cheyanne Turions – An artist and art curator who claimed an Indigenous Canadian identity for grant applications until "outed" in 2021, Turions later stated that she had investigated her family's history and that as a result "I changed my self-identification to settler," and resigned from her position as a curator.

=== Other ===
- Edgar Laplante (1888–1944), an American-born French-Canadian con man and actor known for his confidence tricks.

== See also ==
- 1896 Applications for Enrollment, Five Tribes (Overturned)
- Australian Aboriginal identity
- Cherokee descent
- Cherokee Nation Truth in Advertising for Native Art, a law passed by the Cherokee Nation about marketing products as Indian-made
- Eatock v Bolt, an Australian case involving writings that suggested false claims of Aboriginal descent
- Eastern Métis
- Ghost Warrior Society
- Guion Miller Roll
- Federal Law for the Protection of Cultural Heritage of Indigenous and Afro-Mexican Peoples and Communities
- Indian Arts and Crafts Act of 1990
- Indian arts and crafts laws
- Índia pega no laço
- List of organizations that self-identify as FNIM governments
- List of organizations that self-identify as Native American tribes
- Native American identity in the United States
- Native Americans in German popular culture
- Passing (racial identity)
- Plastic shaman
- Racial misrepresentation
- Category:People who self-identify as being of Indigenous descent
- Reel Injun – A 2009 Canadian documentary film about the portrayal of Native Americans in Hollywood films
- Qalipu First Nation
- Washitaw Nation
