= Wabanquot =

Wabanquot may refer to:

- Wabanquot (Chippewa chief) (ca. 1830–1898), Chippewa chief
- USS Wabanquot (YTB-525), later YTM-525, a United States Navy tug in service from 1945 to 1947 and from 1948 to 1976
