= Wymysłowo, Tuchola County =

Wymysłowo
- Hamlet
- Location within Kuyavian-Pomeranian Voivodeship Location within Poland
- Coordinates: 53°36′25″N 17°54′59″E
- Country: Poland
- Voivodeship: Kuyavian-Pomeranian
- County: Tuchola
- Municipality: Tuchola
- Time zone: UTC+1 (CET)
  - Summer (DST): UTC+2 (CEST)
- Postal code: 89-500
- Climate: Cfb

Wymysłowo (Polish: [vɘ̟.mɘ̟ˈswɔ.vɔ]) is a hamlet in the Kuyavian-Pomeranian Voivodeship, Poland, within the municipality of Tuchola in Tuchola County.

== Culture ==
Wymysłowo includes the Sat-Okh Museum of the Culture of North American Indians, opened in the year 2000, which is devoted to the culture of the indigenous peoples of North America. It is dedicated to Sat-Okh, a book author and promoter of the Native American culture, who claimed to be of Polish and Shawnee descent. However, his origins are heavily disputed, while his works are criticized for not accurate depictions of Native Americans.
