= Racial misrepresentation =

Impersonation of a race other than one's own

Racial or ethnic misrepresentation occurs when someone deliberately misrepresents their racial or ethnic background. It may occur for a variety of reasons, such as someone attempting to benefit from affirmative action programs for which they are not eligible.

Historically, many people of color passed as white for survival and safety. It is possible for a person of any race or ethnicity to misrepresent themselves or be misrepresented. Racial misrepresentation often occurs when people of one race or ethnicity, unfamiliar with real people of another culture, replicate the racial stereotypes of that racial or ethnic group. Typically, this is seen as offensive when negative racial stereotypes are mimicked, but it can be also be experienced as inappropriate even when the imitation is intended as flattery. An example of this is people wearing culturally insensitive Halloween costumes that depict these stereotypes.

== Notable cases ==
- Dan Burros, Jewish American neo-Nazi who falsely claimed he was ethnically German.
- H. G. Carrillo, African-American who falsely presented as Cuban.
- Asa Earl Carter, white American who falsely presented as Cherokee.
- Ward Churchill, white American who falsely claimed to be of mixed Muscogee, Creek, and Cherokee descent.
- "Iron Eyes" Cody, Sicilian-American who falsely claimed to be a member of numerous Native American tribes.
- Misha Defonseca (Monique de Wael), Belgian gentile who falsely presented as a Jewish Holocaust survivor.
- Rachel Dolezal, white American of German, Czech, and Swedish descent who falsely presented as Black.
- Jimmie Durham, white American who falsely claimed to be Cherokee.
- Anita Florence Hemmings, mixed race woman of African and European descent who passed as white.
- Jamake Highwater, white American of Eastern European descent who falsely presented as Cherokee.
- Marie Sophie Hingst, German gentile who falsely presented as descended from Jewish Holocaust survivors.
- Elizabeth Hoover, white American who falsely claimed to be of mixed Mohawk and Mi’kmaq ancestry
- Margaret B. Jones (Margaret Seltzer), white American who falsely claimed to be half-Native American.
- Jessica Krug, white American who falsely presented as half-Algerian, half-German, and Afro-Puerto Rican on different occasions.
- Nasdijj (Timothy Patrick Barrus), white American of European descent who falsely claimed to be Navajo.
- Merle Oberon, half-Burgher, half-Welsh woman who falsely claimed to be a fully white woman of Australian descent.
- Grey Owl, white Englishman who falsely presented as a mixed-race man of Scottish and Apache descent.
- Korla Pandit, African-American who falsely presented as Franco-Indian.
- Tom Pritchard, Afro-Caribbean who falsely presented as African-American. (Note: The term "African American" generally refers to the descendants of Africans enslaved in the continental United States. While Pritchard was the descendant of enslaved Africans, born in the Americas (specifically Grenada), and possibly a U.S. citizen, he was not African American.)
- Fred Trump, New York real-estate developer and founder of the Trump Organization who frequently pretended to be of Swedish descent instead of German as not to deter Jewish tenants from renting apartments from him.
- Buffy Sainte-Marie, white American of English and Italian descent who falsely claimed to be Cree Canadian.
- Sacheen Littlefeather, American of European and Mexican descent who falsely claimed to be Pascua Yaqui.
- Andrea Smith, white American who falsely claimed to be Cherokee.
- Vianne Timmons, white Canadian who falsely claimed to be of Mi'kmaq descent.
- Mary Ellen Turpel-Lafond, white Canadian who falsely claimed to be of Cree descent.
- Elizabeth Warren, white American senator who falsely claimed to be Cherokee.

== See also ==
- Blackface, Brownface, Jewface, Redface, Whiteface, Yellowface
- Cultural appropriation
- Passing (race)
- Pretendian
- Transracial (identity)
- Stereotypes of Indigenous peoples of Canada and the United States
- Wilkomirski syndrome

== Bibliography ==
- Mount, Guy Emerson (June 2018). "Soul Food, Stir Fry, and Citizenship: The Transnational Construction of Tom's Dixie Kitchen in Manila". The Last Reconstruction: Slavery, Emancipation, and Empire in the Black Pacific (PDF) (PhD thesis). University of Chicago. pp. 205–255. Archived from the original (PDF) on July 11, 2024.
