= OKH (disambiguation) =

The Oberkommando des Heeres was the high command of the Army of Nazi Germany.

OKH may also refer to:

- okh, the ISO 639-3 code for Karan language
- A.J. Eisenberg Airport, the FAA LID code OKH
- RAF Cottesmore, the IATA code OKH
- Sat Okh, a soldier in the Polish Resistance during World War II
