= Sat-Okh Museum of the Culture of North American Indians =

- Muzeum Kultury Indian Ameryki Północnej im. Sat-Okha
- Established: 2000
- Location: Wymysłowo, Kuyavian–Pomeranian Voivodeship, Poland
- Coordinates: 53°36′25″N 17°54′59″E
- Type: Private permanent museum
- Director: Jan Kłodziński
- Website: huuskaluta.com.pl/sat_okh/

The Sat-Okh Museum of the Culture of North American Indians, (Note: Polish: Muzeum Kultury Indian Ameryki Północnej im. Sat-Okha) also known as the Indian Museum, (Note: Polish: Muzeum Indiańskie) is a private museum in Wymysłowo, Poland, devoted to the culture of the indigenous peoples of North America. It was opened in 2000 by Jan Kłodziński, with the help of the Polish Movement of Friends of Indians. It is dedicated to Sat-Okh, book author and promoter of the culture of Native Americans, who claimed to be of Polish and Shawnee descent. However, his origins are heavily disputed, while his works are criticized for not accurate depictions of Native Americans.
