= Gina Adams =

American artist and activist

- Born: 1965 (age 60–61)
- Citizenship: American
- Education: Maine College of Art (BFA, 2002); University of Kansas (MFA, 2013)
- Movement: textile art, installation
- Website: ginaadamsartist.com

Gina Adams (born 1965) is an American interdisciplinary artist and activist.

== Family ==
Gina Adams' parents were Philip F. Adams (1937–2002), born in Portsmouth, New Hampshire, and Elaine Rose Theriault Adams who lived in Kittery, Maine. Her family members operated the Kittery Trading Post in the town.

Adams has controversially claimed to be of White Earth Ojibwe and Lakota descent, providing no proof of these claims. She said that her paternal grandfather lived on the White Earth Indian Reservation and was removed at age eight to attend Carlisle Indian Industrial School, which closed in 1918. Genealogists said that Adams' maternal grandfather "was a white man named Albert Theriault, who was born in Massachusetts to French-Canadian parents."

Adams has also said that her great-great-grandfather was Ojibwe chief Wabanquot (1830–1898). The enrollment director of the White Earth Band of the Minnesota Chippewa Tribe, Shahoon Heisler (White Earth Ojibwe) stated: "We don't have her, or her parent or grandparent, with any links to this tribe.... People are upset because she's been claiming she's a descendant. I can't find any documentation that would link her or her family to White Earth."

== Education ==
Gina Adams earned a BFA from the Maine College of Art and an MFA from the University of Kansas. According to her website, she studied visual art, curatorial practice, and critical theory.

== Career ==
Adams was a professor at Naropa University in Boulder, Colorado, in the visual arts faculty.

She joined Emily Carr University in August of 2019 as assistant professor, Foundation. Emily Carr hired Adams as part of a cluster hire of Indigenous professors. She resigned from Emily Carr on August 25, 2022 due to her lying about her ties to Indigenous community .

Adams is known for her quilt art; however, her work spans a range of styles, including mediums such as sculpture, ceramics, painting, printmaking, and drawing.

Adams's work revolved around broken treaties between the U.S. and Native American tribes. Her artwork has been published in The New Yorker, Hyperallergic, and The Huffington Post.

== Additional work ==
Gina's work was also featured in the "March Madness" exhibit in the Meatpacking district of New York. Her work displayed vintage photographs of a girls' basketball team at Osage Boarding School; a school which attempted to assimilate Indigenous children by erasing their Native culture. This school denied children the right to speak their native language, and even denied the right to say their own name.
