= Cheyanne turions =

Canadian art curator, artist, and writer

Cheyanne Turions
- Born: High Prairie, Alberta
- Known for: Artist, Educator, Writer
- Website: https://cheyanneturions.wordpress.com/

Cheyanne Turions, self-styled as cheyanne turions, is a Canadian art curator, artist, and writer.

== Biography ==
Cheyanne Turions was born in High Prairie, Alberta.

Turions studied philosophy at the University of British Columbia before pursuing a Masters of Visual Studies in 2016 from the John H. Daniels Faculty of Architecture, Landscape and Design at the University of Toronto. While a student in Toronto she was awarded the 2014 Award for Emerging Curator of Contemporary Canadian Art. At the time of, award jury member Daina Augaitis explained that turions' "curatorial vision stands out for being highly considered and articulated, as well as being relevant, provocative, risky and ambitious."

Turions was previously the curator at SFU Galleries and earlier the Director of Education and Public Programs at the Vancouver Art Gallery where she curated FUSE: A Conjuring. Previously she was the artistic director for Trinity Square Video and an independent writer and curator based in Toronto, Canada. She has worked on the Wood Land School project with Duane Linklater, Tanya Lukin Linklater, and Walter Scott at the SBC Gallery of Contemporary Art. The collaboration included a symposium that occurred at Or Gallery in 2016.

== Ethnic identity ==
On February 8, 2021, Turions published a statement on her blog noting that, while she had previously identified as having "mixed settler and Indigenous ancestry" out of a belief that her maternal grandfather was "French and Ojibway", she was now choosing to identify as "a settler with some Ojibway ancestry to whom connections have been fractured due to violence, shame and racism". She asserted that she made this change to acknowledge that she did not "[grow] up within Indigenous culture" nor was she "claimed by a specific Indigenous community". Turion again updated her blog on March 10, 2021, noting that she was unable "to find corroborating documentation for my family’s claims to Indigenous ancestry", and was therefore publicly changing her self-identification from mixed ancestry to settler.

On March 16, a Twitter user known as @nomoreredface drew public attention to this change in an extended thread, since deleted. The story was picked up in a March 24, 2021 article in the Vancouver Sun which stated that Cheyanne Turions had been "outed" as a "pretendian" the previous week, "after @nomoreredface published a Twitter thread that included screenshots of grants that Turions received from the Canada Council that were intended for Aboriginal curators, and worth $73,000, and another for $30,000 from the Ontario Arts Council".

Turions was named in a subsequent article of June 2, 2021, published by the online arts magazine Hyperallergic, titled "Who Bears the Steep Costs of Ethnic Fraud?", by Amy Fung, which said: "Ingrained racism has allowed predominantly White institutions to materially benefit from Indigeneity, especially in an era of reconciliation, by preferring to work with 'Indigenous' people who look, act, and think like them, because in reality they are them."

In an April 2021 blog post, Turions stated that genealogical research had disproved her family's claims to Indigenous ancestry, and that she now identified as wholly of non-Indigenous origin. She wrote: "My failure to understand the importance of substantiating what I believed my identity to be raises questions about my complicity with the structures of settler colonialism and white supremacy culture," and that she would work to repay monies received that had been earmarked for Indigenous artists. On November 6, 2021, Turions resigned from her position as curator at SFU Galleries.

== Awards ==
- 2014 Award for Emerging Curator of Contemporary Canadian Art
- 2014 Innovation in a Collections-based Exhibition by the Ontario Association of Art Galleries
- 2014 Hnatyshyn Foundation–TD Bank Group Award for Emerging Curator of Contemporary Canadian Art
- 2015 Reesa Greenberg Curatorial Studies Award from the Justina M. Barnicke Gallery of the University of Toronto
