= Elizabeth Hoover (social scientist) =

American social scientist (born 1978)

- Born: 1978 (age 47–48); Knox, New York, U.S.
- Education: Williams College; Brown University
- Scientific career
- Fields: Environmental science, policy, Indigenous food sovereignty
- Workplaces: Brown University; University of California, Berkeley

Elizabeth Hoover (born 1978) is an American social scientist specializing in environmental science, policy, and Indigenous food sovereignty. She is an associate professor at the University of California, Berkeley where her research has focused on environmental health and community-engaged approaches to food justice. In 2022, she faced public controversy after acknowledging that genealogical research did not substantiate her earlier claims of Native American ancestry.

== Early life and education ==
Hoover was born in 1978 in Knox, New York. Her mother, Anita, claimed that their family descended from Mohawk and Mi’kmaq ancestry, a narrative based on family lore. These stories shaped Hoover’s upbringing, including participation in cultural practices and powwows.

Hoover graduated from Williams College in 2001 with a B.A. in anthropology and psychology. She completed a M.A. in anthropology and museum studies at Brown University, completing it in 2003. In 2010, she earned a Ph.D. in anthropology from Brown University, submitting a dissertation focused on the health impacts of environmental contamination on the Mohawk community of Akwesasne.

== Career ==
Hoover joined Brown University in 2012 as the Manning Assistant Professor of American Studies and Ethnic Studies and later became an associate professor. During her tenure at Brown, she held administrative roles such as the faculty chair of the Native American and Indigenous studies initiative and director of undergraduate studies for ethnic studies.

In 2020, Hoover moved to the University of California, Berkeley (UCB), where she became an associate professor in the department of environmental science, policy, and management. Her academic focus has included Indigenous food sovereignty, environmental justice, and community-engaged research. She has published articles and books, including The River Is in Us: Fighting Toxics in a Mohawk Community and Indigenous Food Sovereignty in the United States.

Following a public controversy regarding her claimed Native ancestry, Hoover continued her work at UCB. She stated that she would no longer collaborate with Native communities in her professional capacity.

== Personal life ==
Hoover said she was raised believing she was descended from Mohawk and Mi’kmaq ancestors. This identity influenced her participation in cultural events and practices throughout her youth and early career. In 2022, Hoover publicly acknowledged that genealogical research found no documentation supporting her claims of Native ancestry. She described herself as "a white person who has incorrectly identified as Native my whole life, based on incomplete information".

Her former partner, Adam Sings In The Timber, is a photographer from the Crow Nation.

== Selected works ==
- Hoover, Elizabeth (2017). The River is in Us: Fighting Toxics in a Mohawk Community. University of Minnesota Press. ISBN 978-1-5179-0302-2.
- Mihesuah, Devon A.; Hoover, Elizabeth, eds. (2019). Indigenous Food Sovereignty in the United States: Restoring Cultural Knowledge, Protecting Environments, and Regaining Health. University of Oklahoma Press. ISBN 978-0-8061-6321-5.

== See also ==
- Racial misrepresentation
