= Carrie Bourassa =

Canadian academic

Carrie Bourassa is a former professor in community health and epidemiology at the University of Saskatchewan. She claimed to be of Métis, Anishinaabe and Tlingit ancestry, but a 2021 investigation by the Canadian Broadcasting Corporation concluded that there was no evidence of this. After its publication, she was suspended from her position and ultimately resigned in 2022.

== Early life ==
Bourassa lived in Regina, Saskatchewan as a child. Her parents operated a real estate development company and a car cleaning business in Qu’Appelle Valley. Bourassa's family was middle-class, though she later claimed to have grown up in an impoverished household. Bourassa attended the University of Regina. She asserted to be of Métis heritage as a student and therefore received thousands of dollars in scholarships from Métis organizations. Her master's thesis was on the subject of gambling in indigenous communities.

== Career ==
Bourassa was a professor in community health and epidemiology at the University of Saskatchewan, where she directed a health research lab called Morningstar Lodge. She was also the director of a subdivision of the Canadian Institutes of Health Research (CIHR), which is a federal agency. Her career has been compared to Grey Owl's. Bourassa's sister and aunt stopped identifying as Métis in 2014 when they became uncertain that their family history supported this. Bourassa responded to this situation by describing her relatives as selfish and that they had "turned their back" on the Métis community. In 2019, Bourassa gave a TEDx talk in which she described her childhood. She stated that her grandfather was Métis and that no one in her family had made it past the eighth grade. Bourassa also claimed Anishinaabe and Tlingit heritage later on in her career.

=== Ancestry investigation and resignation ===
In 2021, the Canadian Broadcasting Corporation (CBC) performed investigative journalism and determined that all of her ancestors were European. When she became aware that the CBC was investigating her ancestry, she stated that it was appalling to accuse her of faking it. A letter supporting her was written by the CIHR in response and had 30 signatures, although some board members disputed ever signing it. Once CBC published the article, Bourassa stated that she continued to identify as Métis and disputed blood quantum classification of ancestry. Her colleagues did their own investigation and determined that the relatives she claimed as indigenous were Russian, Polish, and Czechoslovak. When Bourassa resigned from her position in 2022, the university kept their internal investigation open but shifted its focus to improving their internal policies surrounding indigenous identity instead of her specifically. The 86 page report was released later that year.

== See also ==
- Indigenous identity fraud in Canada and the United States
- University of Saskatchewan academics
- Buffy Sainte-Marie
- Grey Owl
- Mary Ellen Turpel-Lafond
- Thomas King (novelist)
