= Ontario March of Dimes =

Canadian charitable organization

Ontario March of Dimes (in French La Marche des Dix Sous de l'Ontario; officially Rehabilitation Foundation for the Disabled) is a charitable organization which provides programs and services to people of all ages with physical disabilities in Ontario, Canada. Its headquarters is in Toronto. It is not affiliated with the American organization called March of Dimes.

== History ==
Ontario March of Dimes (OMOD) began in 1951 as the Canadian Foundation of Poliomyelitis, which funded research and provided medical and rehabilitation services to people with polio. As new vaccines reduced the threat from this disease, the organization changed its mandate to focus on services for people with physical disabilities, particularly physical and vocational training and rehabilitation.

The organization officially changed its name to Ontario March of Dimes in 1973, and gradually expanded to include other service areas such as recreational activities, advocacy and supportive housing.

It reconnected to its origins in 1985 by creating a chapter-based support and information network for people experiencing post-polio syndrome, or the late effects of polio. The program expanded to the national level in 2002 with Polio Canada.

For many years other organizations in Canada also operated under the name March of Dimes as members of the Easter Seals March of Dimes National Council.

In 2005, however, Ontario March of Dimes acquired the exclusive right to use 'March of Dimes' in Canada, and now operates March of Dimes Canada as a national subsidiary of Ontario March of Dimes. It no longer has any affiliation with Easter Seals Canada.

In 1993, OMOD coordinated the first conference on Conductive Education in Canada, and in 2000 established the first full-time program, serving both adults and children. March of Dimes Canada is currently planning to expand the program throughout the country.

To commemorate the International Year of the Volunteer, in 2001 the Royal Canadian Mint issued a dime in honour of the 50th anniversary of Ontario March of Dimes.

During the 2006 Canadian federal election, 23-year-old Ontario March of Dimes intern Warren Rupnarain, a person with cerebral palsy who uses a wheelchair, visited the campaign offices of the three major political parties in all 22 Toronto ridings to raise awareness of disability issues. Called "Warren's World", this initiative was recorded and "blogged" through its official website.

=== Fraudulent accounts ===
In 2015, a long-time March of Dimes employee, Karima Manji, was charged by Toronto police with allegedly defrauding the charity of $800,000 through the use of false bank accounts and forged invoices. Manji, who worked as a property manager for the organization's non-profit residences since 2005, was accused of siphoning funds from the charity and funneling them into a false March of Dimes bank account. She was charged with fraud, theft, possession of property obtained by a crime, and presenting a forged document. Manji paid back more than $500,000 and was placed under two years' house arrest.
