= Jean Teillet =

Canadian lawyer and author of Métis descent

- Born: 1953; St Vital, Winnipeg, Canada
- Education: York University, University of Toronto
- Occupations: Lawyer, author
- Relatives: Louis Riel (great-granduncle), Roger Teillet (uncle)

Jean Teillet is a Canadian retired lawyer and author of Métis descent. Her legal work has specialised in Métis and First Nations land rights in Canada.

Teillet is Counsel Emeritus at the Canadian law firm Pape Salter Teillet having retired from legal practice in January 2024.

== Career ==
Teillet received her LL.B and LL.M from the University of Toronto Faculty of Law.

== Métis and Indigenous rights and history ==
Teillet was a founder of the Métis Nation of Ontario. Teillet was a lead counsel regarding the R v Powley defining Métis Aboriginal rights.

In 2019, Teillet wrote history of the Métis people called The North-West Is Our Mother: The Story of Louis Riel's People, the Métis Nation. The book won the Carol Shields Winnipeg Book Award at the 2020 Manitoba Book Awards.

In October 2022, Teillet wrote a report commissioned by University of Saskatchewan entitled Indigenous Identity Fraud following a controversy regarding the Indigenous identity of one of their faculty (Carrie Bourassa).

In April 2023, Teillet suggested that institutions should have policies to check identity when people claim Indigenous rights. August 2023, Teillet criticized the candidate vetting processes by major political parties in Canada regarding Indigenous identity claims.

== Personal life ==
Teillet is the great-grandniece of Louis Riel, a political leader of the Métis people.

== Honorary doctorates ==
- University of Guelph, 2014
- Law Society of Ontario, 2015
- University of Windsor, 2017

== Works ==
- Teillet, Jean (2019). The North-West Is Our Mother: The Story of Louis Riel's People, the Métis Nation. Patrick Crean Editions. p. 592. ISBN 978-1443450126
