= Mary Ellen Turpel-Lafond =

Canadian judge and academic (born 1963)

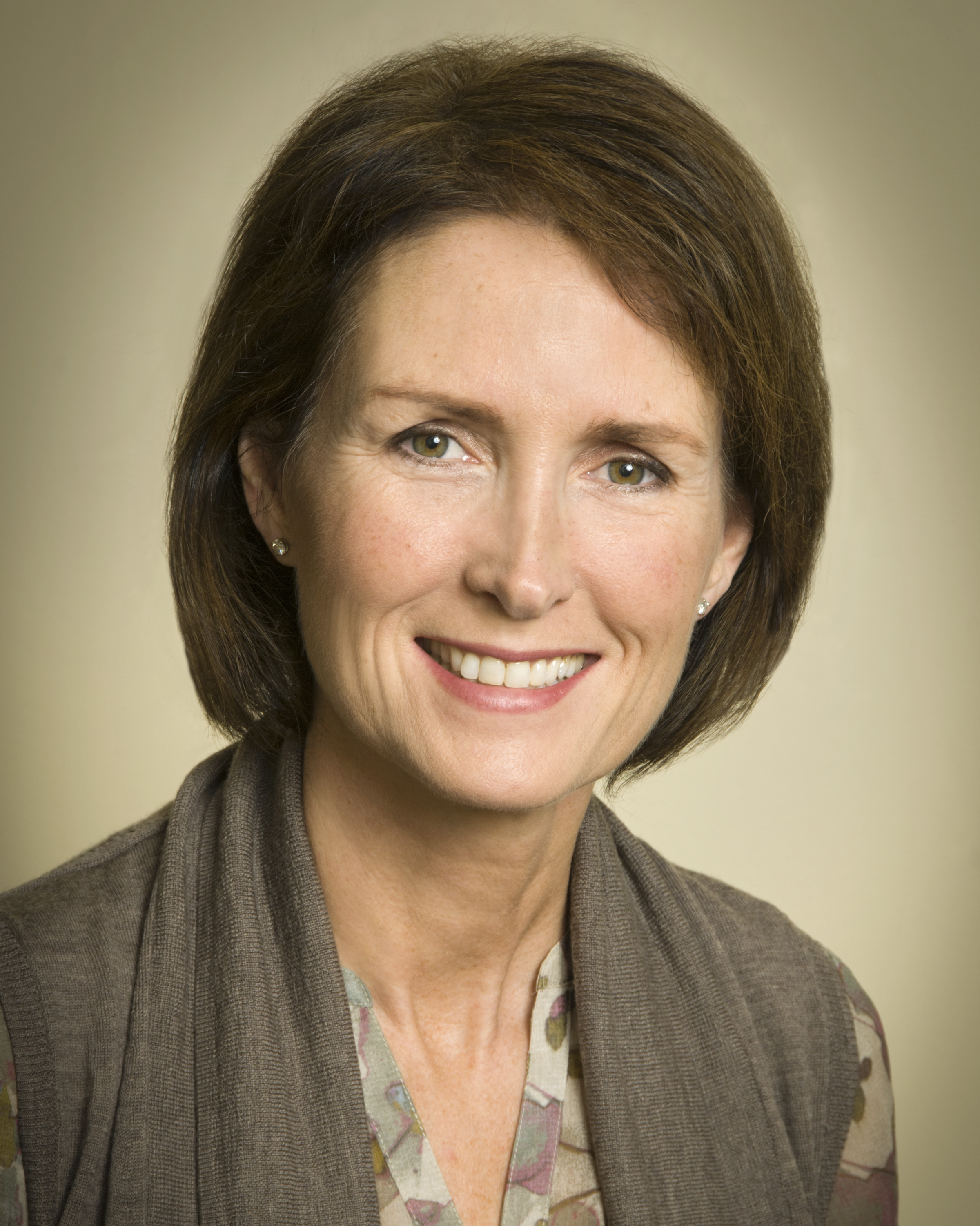
- Turpel-Lafond in 2011
- Born: February 1963 (age 63)
- Other names: Mary Ellen Elizabeth Turpel-Lafond aki-kwe
- Education: Carleton University; York University
- Occupations: Lawyer; judge; academic

Mary Ellen Elizabeth Turpel-Lafond (born February 1963) is a Canadian lawyer and law professor. She has served as a judge and as a legislative advocate for children's rights.

Turpel-Lafond has been a legal and constitutional adviser to aboriginal leaders, including to Ovide Mercredi, National Chief of the Assembly of First Nations, during the negotiations over the Charlottetown Accord. She worked on land claims with the Indian Law Resource Center in Washington, DC. She has taught at Dalhousie University, the University of Toronto, and the University of Notre Dame, and has served as a judge on the Provincial Court of Saskatchewan. Time magazine named Turpel-Lafond as one of "100 Global Leaders of Tomorrow" in 1994; in 1999, Time honoured her as one of the "Top 20 Canadian Leaders for the 21st Century". Turpel-Lafond also served as British Columbia's first Representative for Children and Youth. In 2018, Turpel-Lafond became a professor at the Peter A. Allard School of Law at the University of British Columbia (UBC). She was later named the inaugural director of the University of British Columbia's Indian Residential School History and Dialogue Centre.

Turpel-Lafond faced public scrutiny in 2022 over a report by CBC News stating that "some of Turpel-Lafond's claims about her Cree ancestry, her treaty Indian status, the community where she grew up and her academic accomplishments" were "inconsistent with publicly available documents". Following the CBC report, she left her UBC role and many of her awards were revoked or relinquished. In 2024, the Law Society of British Columbia reprimanded Turpel-Lafond after she admitted to professional misconduct; the Society's report revealed that she had some Indigenous ancestry identified via DNA, but no ancestral link to a specific Indigenous community.

== Early life and education ==
Turpel-Lafond was born in February 1963 to William and Shirley Turpel. She has three older sisters. While Turpel-Lafond has stated that she was born and raised on the First Nation reserve of the Norway House Cree Nation in Manitoba, a 2022 report by CBC News stated that Turpel-Lafond was likely born and raised in Niagara Falls, Ontario. Turpel-Lafond has stated that there was alcoholism and violence in her family's home and that she experienced poverty and sexual abuse in her youth.

Turpel-Lafond received a bachelor of arts degree from Carleton University in 1982. She holds a law degree from Osgoode Hall at York University and received a diploma in international law from the University of Cambridge in 1989. Turpel-Lafond was awarded a doctorate of law from Harvard Law School in 1997.

In a 2018 curriculum vitae, Turpel-Lafond stated that she had received a Master of Laws (LLM) degree from Cambridge. When asked by reporters, the University of Cambridge stated that the diploma she had received is a substantially different credential from the LLM degree. Turpel-Lafond's 2018 curriculum vitae also indicated that she received her doctorate from Harvard in 1990; however, a 2022 CBC News report stated that she did not receive that degree until 1997.

== Career ==
=== Lawyer ===
Turpel-Lafond has been a member of the bar in Nova Scotia and Saskatchewan. She appeared before the Supreme Court of Canada. Turpel-Lafond worked on land claims with the Indian Law Resource Center in Washington, DC, and served as a legal and constitutional adviser to aboriginal leaders. During the negotiations over the Charlottetown Accord, a package of proposed amendments to the Constitution of Canada, Turpel-Lafond was a legal and constitutional advisor to Ovide Mercredi, National Chief of the Assembly of First Nations. Turpel-Lafond and Mercredi co-wrote a book, In the Rapids: Navigating the Future of First Nations.

During a 2013 speech at a Canadian Federation for the Humanities and Social Sciences event, Turpel-Lafond stated that she had received the designation of Queen's Counsel (QC) from the Government of Saskatchewan. However, both the Ministry of Justice of Saskatchewan and the Law Society of Saskatchewan report that there is no record of Turpel-Lafond being appointed Queen's Counsel.

==== Law Society of British Columbia ====
As of February 2, 2024, Turpel-Lafond was listed as "non-practising" by the Law Society of British Columbia, the regulatory body for lawyers in that province.

Turpel-Lafond became a member of the Law Society of British Columbia in 2018. An investigation by its Discipline Committee in 2024 found that Turpel-Lafond had committed professional misconduct in relation to misrepresentations when joining the society along with testimony at the National Inquiry into Missing and Murdered Indigenous Women and Girls in 2018. According to the report, Turpel-Lafond inaccurately claimed to have been called to the bar of New Brunswick, said she had co-authored a book when no such book had been published, claimed to have been awarded an honorary degree from First Nations University of Canada when no such award had been made, and stated that she had been a tenured professor at Dalhousie Law School for 15 years when she was only tenured for two. The society's report found that she likely had recent ancestors with substantial Indigenous DNA, but had no link to a specific Indigenous community; as of July 2024, the results of the DNA test had not been made public. Turpel-Lafond admitted to professional misconduct. The society reprimanded Turpel-Lafond and ordered her to "pay $10,000 to a non-profit organization that supports Indigenous justice".

=== Judge ===
In 1998, Turpel-Lafond was appointed as a Provincial Court judge in Saskatchewan. At the time, she was thought to be the first Treaty Indian to be appointed as a Provincial Court judge in Saskatchewan.

In 2017, Turpel-Lafond was said to be under consideration as a potential appointment to the Supreme Court of Canada.

=== Children's representative ===
After serving as a judge for eight years, Turpel-Lafond was appointed as British Columbia's first Representative for Children and Youth. In that capacity, she issued 93 reports and made 200 recommendations. In 2015, Turpel-Lafond called for the government to hire immediately at least 250 social workers for Indigenous children, in order to provide needed services and protect vulnerable children. Turpel-Lafond left her position as Representative for Children and Youth in 2016.

In 2017, Turpel-Lafond filed a lawsuit against the province of British Columbia which claimed that the government broke a verbal agreement to provide her with 18 months worth of pension credits for each year of service. The statement of claim said the province had a history of animosity with Turpel-Lafond. It says a deputy minister told her in 2015 that "the government would treat her as a 'member of the opposition'".

=== Academic ===
Before a 2022 CBC News report cast doubt on her statements of Indian ancestry, Turpel-Lafond was celebrated as one of the most accomplished First Nations scholars in the history of Canada. Turpel-Lafond taught law at the University of Notre Dame, the University of Toronto, and other universities.

Turpel-Lafond taught law at Dalhousie University. A 2024 investigation by the Discipline Committee of the Law Society of British Columbia found that Turpel-Lafond claimed to have been a tenured professor at Dalhousie for 15 years when she was only tenured there for two years.

Turpel-Lafond also held the position of Aboriginal Scholar at the University of Saskatchewan.

According to Turpel-Lafond, she co-authored a book with University of British Columbia professor Grant Charles in 2017 entitled Indigenous Customary Adoption and Reconciliation. Charles says he has no recollection of writing such a book.

==== University of British Columbia ====
In 2018, Turpel-Lafond joined the Peter A. Allard School of Law at the University of British Columbia (UBC) as professor and was subsequently named the inaugural director of the University of British Columbia's Indian Residential School History and Dialogue Centre. She resigned as director in June 2022, while continuing as a professor at the university.

On January 3, 2023, it was reported that as of December 16, 2022, Turpel-Lafond was no longer employed by the University of British Columbia. Turpel-Lafond's departure from UBC was marked by controversy, with her stating that she "retired" from her position, a statement which UBC declined to confirm. The Globe and Mail stated that Turpel-Lafond was removed from her position at the Peter A. Allard School of Law "because of the compelling evidence that she isn't who she says she is".

== Representations about ancestry and upbringing ==
=== Background ===
Turpel-Lafond has stated that she is a Treaty Indian "of Cree, Scottish and English heritage" (Cree via her father, and Scottish and English via her mother). She has stated that her father, William Turpel, "was Cree, spoke Cree and lived the values of a Cree person". Turpel-Lafond has asserted that her father was a Cree child who was informally adopted by a white couple, William Nicholson Turpel and Eleanor Rhoda Turpel.

Turpel-Lafond has also stated that she was born and raised on the First Nation reserve of the Norway House Cree Nation in Manitoba.

=== CBC reports ===
In October 2022, CBC News reported that "some of Turpel-Lafond's claims about her Cree ancestry, her treaty Indian status, the community where she grew up and her academic accomplishments" were "inconsistent with publicly available documents". Specifically, CBC News reported that a birth certificate, a baptismal record, and a newspaper birth announcement all show that Turpel-Lafond's father, William Turpel, was the biological child of Canadian–British couple William Nicholson Turpel and Eleanor Rhoda Turpel. A cousin and an aunt of Turpel-Lafond have both told reporters that they had never known William Turpel to have either been adopted or have been of Cree ancestry. Joe Keeper, a Cree man born at Norway House who was a schoolmate of William Turpel, has told media that he knew William Turpel to be white and that he had never heard anyone say that William Turpel was a Cree Indian. Keeper further recalled that William Turpel's father was a white doctor in the community who had treated him for double pneumonia and dysentery during his youth. However, Turpel-Lafond's sister, Melinda Turpel, has asserted that her father was either adopted or was born as the result of an affair between her grandfather and a Cree woman.

A November 2022 report by CBC News found no evidence to support Turpel-Lafond's claim that she was born and raised on the First Nation reserve of the Norway House Cree Nation in Manitoba. Rather, the November 2022 CBC report states that Turpel-Lafond was likely born and raised in the Niagara Falls area. The CBC's November 2022 report is based on voter records for Turpel-Lafond's parents; a yearbook for a Niagara Falls high school containing an entry for Turpel-Lafond; another Niagara Falls yearbook showing an entry for Turpel-Lafond's older sister; the 1996 edition of Who's Who in Canada, which lists her place of birth as Niagara Falls; her ex-husband's statement that he understood her to have been born and raised in Niagara Falls; and statements from her cousins indicating that she was born and raised in Niagara Falls.

=== Reactions ===
After the October 2022 CBC News report was published, the University of British Columbia initially affirmed its support for Turpel-Lafond. A university spokesperson commented that Indigenous ancestry was not a prerequisite for her employment and that Turpel-Lafond's "identity is her own and the university is not going to comment on it". Turpel left the School of Law in 2023. According to The Globe and Mail, Turpel-Lafond was removed from her position at the School of Law due to evidence that her claims about her background were untrue.

Grand Chief Stewart Phillip, president of the Union of British Columbia Indian Chiefs, said he supported Turpel-Lafond and denounced accusations against her as a "disgusting witch hunt". Other Indigenous groups such as the Saskatoon Tribal Council along with individuals also offered support to Turpel-Lafond.

The Indigenous Women's Collective criticized the university's response to the report, saying that "university leaders have been too swift to publicly defend an individual claiming to hold Treaty Indian status and Indigeneity, when in fact there is no verifiable evidence to support that claim".

Aly Bear, vice chief of the Federation of Sovereign Indigenous Nations, initially joined a statement of support for Turpel-Lafond; she later retracted her support. Cindy Blackstock, professor of social work at McGill University, and member of the Gitxsan First Nation, concluded that the birth certificate of Turpel-Lafond's father "... was pretty clear and convincing evidence suggesting that in this case there is no Indigenous identity per se".

In 2024, the Law Society of British Columbia found that Turpel-Lafond had committed professional misconduct in relation to misrepresentations when joining the society. The society reprimanded Turpel-Lafond and ordered her to "pay $10,000 to a non-profit organization that supports Indigenous justice".

== Honours and accolades ==
In 1994, Time named Turpel-Lafond as one of "100 Global Leaders of Tomorrow". In 1999, Time honoured her as one of the "Top 20 Canadian Leaders for the 21st Century".

=== Honorary degrees ===
During her career, Turpel-Lafond was awarded honorary degrees from 11 Canadian universities. However, following the controversy surrounding her ancestry claims, all of her honorary degrees were either rescinded by the relevant universities or voluntarily relinquished.

In March 2023, Turpel-Lafond stated that it was liberating to be freed of her various honours because it allowed her to "focus on what really matters" in her life. She stated that she did not have any emotional attachment to "titles, honours or accolades."

University	Year Awarded	Status
University of Regina	2003	Rescinded
Mount Saint Vincent University	2005	Rescinded
Thompson Rivers University	2009	Voluntarily relinquished
Brock University	2010	Voluntarily relinquished
Vancouver Island University	2013	Voluntarily relinquished
York University	2013	Voluntarily relinquished
McGill University	2014	Rescinded
Royal Roads University	2016	Voluntarily relinquished
Simon Fraser University	2016	Voluntarily relinquished
St. Thomas University	2017	Voluntarily relinquished
Carleton University	2019	Rescinded

According to a publicly available curriculum vitae, Turpel-Lafond has asserted that she had received an honorary doctorate from First Nations University of Canada in 2001. However, CBC has reported that First Nations University of Canada has never granted an honorary degree in the history of the institution and "any mention of receiving an honorary degree or award from FNUniv is erroneous".

=== Order of Canada ===
In December 2021, Turpel-Lafond was appointed an Officer of the Order of Canada. In September 2023, after doubt had been cast upon her assertions of Indigenous ancestry, she was removed from the Order at her request.

=== British Columbia Civil Liberties Association ===
On March 9, 2023, the British Columbia Civil Liberties Association announced that it had stripped Turpel-Lafond of the Reg Robson Award it had previously given her in 2020. The BCCLA stated that information had come to their board's attention "that demonstrates, in our view, that Dr. Turpel-Lafond falsified her claims to Cree ancestry", and that she had made other academic and professional claims, "all of which, in our view, erode her professional integrity". In response, Turpel-Lafond stated that she was surprised that the BCCLA had stripped her of the award without first providing her with an opportunity to make any comments.

=== Research agencies' reaction ===
Three Canadian research agencies announced in 2024 that they were developing a policy to ensure that grants meant for Indigenous researchers actually go to Indigenous people. The report cited the Turpel-Lafond case, amongst other similar cases, as being part of the reason for developing such a policy.

=== Community award ===
In 2010, the BC Aboriginal Child Care Society awarded the Perry Shawana Award to Turpel-Lafond.

== Personal life ==
From at least 1989, Turpel-Lafond has used the name aki-kwe in certain contexts. She has said that an elder from Roseau River Anishinabe First Nation gave her that name in 1985.

Turpel-Lafond was married to Mark Austin.In a civil ceremony, She was married to George Lafond, in the 1990’s and separated in 2013

Turpel-Lafond lives in North Saanich, British Columbia. She has a son and three daughters, including one set of twins.

Turpel-Lafond has been described as a member of the Muskeg Lake Cree Nation. On October 12, 2022, Chief Kelly Wolfe of the Muskeg Lake Cree Nation issued a public statement confirming that "Mary-Ellen [Turpel-Lafond] is a member of the Muskeg Lake Cree Nation and has been for nearly 30 years."

== See also ==
- Indigenous identity fraud in Canada and the United States
- Carrie Bourassa
- Buffy Sainte-Marie
- Grey Owl
- Thomas King (novelist)
