= USS Wabanquot =

Tugboat of the United States Navy

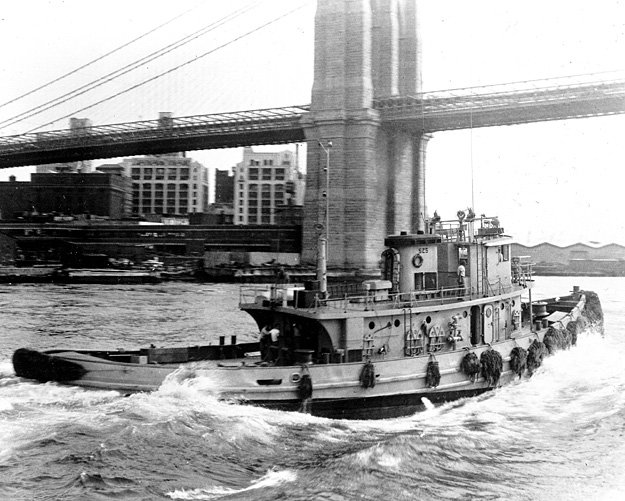
- USS Wabanquot (YTB-525) Hisada class tug in New York harbor 1948-76.

History

United States
- Name: USS Wabanquot
- Namesake: Wabanquot, a Chippewa chief
- Operator: Three Rivers Towing
- Builder: Gibbs Gas Engine Company, Jacksonville, Florida
- Laid down: May 1945
- Launched: 9 August 1945
- Acquired: 13 November 1945
- Reclassified: Medium harbor tug YTM-525 in February 1962
- Stricken: April 1976

General characteristics
- Class & type: Hisada-class
- Displacement: 310 tons (full)
- Length: 101 ft 0 in (30.78 m)
- Beam: 28 ft 0 in (8.53 m)
- Draft: 9 ft 7 in (2.92 m)
- Speed: 12 knots
- Complement: 10

USS Wabanquot (YTB-525), later YTM-525, was a tug that served in the United States Navy from 1945 to 1976.

Wabanquot was a Hisada-class tug laid down in May 1945 at Jacksonville, Florida, by the Gibbs Gas Engine Company. She was launched on 9 August 1945, sponsored by Mrs. G. W. Scott Jr., and delivered to the U.S. Navy on 13 November 1945.

Originally intended for World War II service in the Western Pacific, Wabanquot instead was assigned to the 11th Naval District at San Diego, California, because the war had ended before her completion. She was transferred to the United States Atlantic Fleet in 1947 and was placed in reserve status with the 16th Fleet.

In 1948, Wabanquot was assigned to the 3rd Naval District. She provided towing services and pilot assistance at New York City from 1948 to 1976. In February 1962, she was reclassified as a medium harbor tug and redesignated YTM-525.

Wabanquot was struck from the Navy list in April 1976.

Lately she was acquired by a Southamerican shipowner, renamed "Vikingo". Nowadays she is operated by Three Rivers Towing, in Paraguay River basin.
