= Sacheen Littlefeather =

American actress and activist (1946–2022)

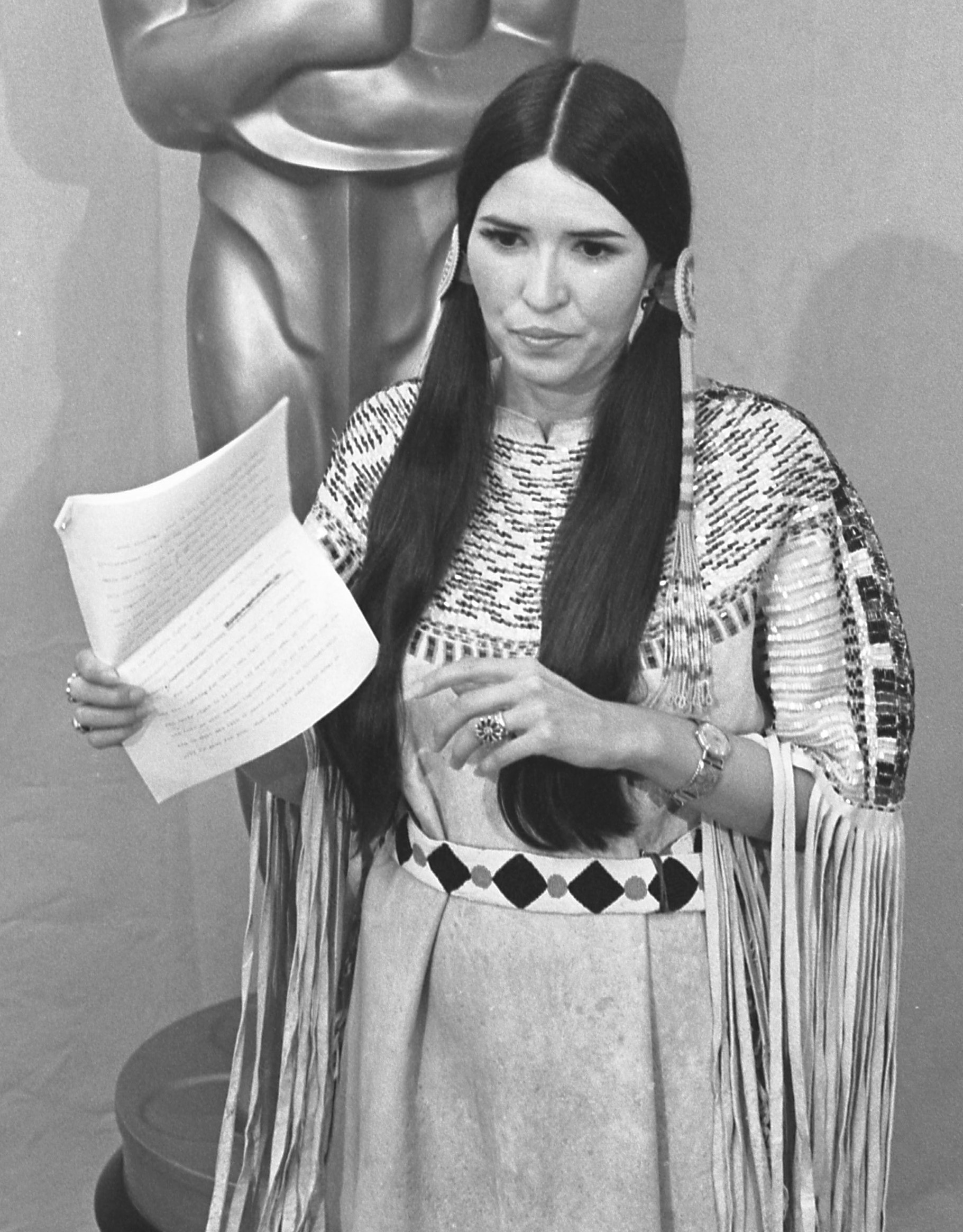
- Littlefeather at the 45th Academy Awards in 1973, which she attended on behalf of Marlon Brando
- Born: Maria Louise Cruz; November 14, 1946; Salinas, California, U.S.
- Died: October 2, 2022 (aged 75); Novato, California, U.S.
- Citizenship: United States (until 1972)
- Occupations: Actress; model; activist
- Spouses: Michael Rubio; Charles Koshiway Johnston

Maria Louise Cruz (November 14, 1946 – October 2, 2022), better known as Sacheen Littlefeather, was an American-born actress and activist for Native American civil rights. After her death, she was accused by family members and journalists of falsely claiming to have Native American ancestry.

Littlefeather represented Marlon Brando at the 45th Academy Awards (the Oscars) in 1973, where she — on Brando's behalf — declined the Best Actor award that he won for his performance in The Godfather. The favorite to win the award, Brando boycotted the ceremony as a protest against Hollywood's portrayal of Native Americans and to draw attention to the standoff at Wounded Knee. During her speech, the audience's response to Brando's boycott was divided between booing and applause.

After the Academy Awards speech, Littlefeather worked in hospice care. She continued her activism for Native American issues, especially including healthcare and unemployment. She also produced films about Native Americans. In June 2022, the Academy sent Littlefeather a statement of apology that was read in full at An Evening with Sacheen Littlefeather on September 17, two weeks before her death.

Littlefeather said her father was of Apache and Yaqui ancestry and her mother was of European descent. Shortly after Littlefeather's death, Navajo writer and activist Jacqueline Keeler interviewed Littlefeather's two sisters, who said that their family is not Native American and that Littlefeather fabricated her Native American ancestry. They also said that their father, who was born in Oxnard, California, was of Spanish-Mexican descent and had no tribal ties.

== Early life ==
Littlefeather was born Marie Louise Cruz or Maria Louise Cruz on November 14, 1946, in Salinas, California. Her mother, Geroldine Marie Cruz (née Barnitz), was a leather stamper of French, German, and Dutch descent, and was born and raised in Santa Barbara, California. Littlefeather's father was Manuel Ybarra Cruz, a saddlemaker of Mexican descent who was born and raised in Oxnard, California.

Littlefeather repeatedly claimed that her father had White Mountain Apache and Yaqui ancestry. However, her sisters, as well as researchers who have looked into the claim, confirm that he was of Spanish-Mexican ancestry with no known ancestors who had a tribal identity in Mexico, and he had no connection to the Yaqui or White Mountain Apache tribes of Arizona.

Both Geroldine and Manuel were saddlemakers. Geroldine learned the craft from Leo Leonard, who owned Leonard Saddle Company in Santa Barbara, and Manuel learned to make saddles as a boy in San Francisco. By 1949, they had moved to Salinas and opened up their own business, Cruz Saddlery. Geroldine Cruz continued to operate the business after her husband's death in 1966.

Littlefeather attended North Salinas High School from 1960 to 1964 and was active in 4-H, winning awards in home economics categories such as food preservation and fashion. After high school, she attended Hartnell Junior College and studied elementary education.

Littlefeather said that around age 19, she spent a year in a psychiatric hospital after previously hearing voices that pushed her to a suicide attempt, recounting what happened during a three-hour visual history interview in 2022 with the director of the Academy Museum of Motion Pictures. According to Littlefeather, the institution was a "hell hole" and doctors used what she said was "psychodrama" role-playing her parents "while black-hooded figures listened in a dim-lit room" to help her "reconstruct memories of childhood abuse and abandonment." Littlefeather said she was diagnosed with schizophrenia. In 1969, she moved to the San Francisco Bay Area to pursue a modeling career, with a portfolio of photos taken by Kenneth Cook of Cook's Photography. She said she had been treated with thorazine and other medications but "mostly stabilized with much help" from the San Francisco Bay Area Native American community.

While she attended California State College at Hayward (now California State University, East Bay) and studied dramatics and speech, she continued to cultivate a Native American identity. In 1969, she joined the United Bay Indian Council. She claimed to have participated part-time in the occupation of Alcatraz in 1970, though this claim has been disputed. Around this time, she adopted the name Sacheen Littlefeather. She said she chose the name Sacheen because that was the name her father called her before he died, and Littlefeather came from the feather she always wore in her hair. She learned more about Native American customs from elders and other protesters, such as Adam Fortunate Eagle (then known as Adam Nordwall). In an interview after her Academy Awards appearance, Fortunate Eagle confirmed that Littlefeather had supported the protest at Alcatraz; however, according to an article published after Littlefeather's death, activist LaNada War Jack, who was at Alcatraz, said Littlefeather was not there.

In 1974, Littlefeather attended classes at the American Conservatory Theater, studying acting, yoga, fencing, Shakespeare, dancing, and other various skills for her acting career. She played the role of Paleflower in Winterhawk, filmed in Kalispell, Montana.

=== Accounts of abusive childhood ===
In interviews, Littlefeather said she had a difficult childhood. In a 1974 interview, she stated that her mother left her father when she was four and took her to live with her maternal grandparents. In 1988, she stated that her parents lived next door to her maternal grandparents, Marie and Gerold "Barney" Barnitz, while she and her two younger sisters lived with those grandparents. She characterized this as either being "adopted", or in foster care. During a 1976 television interview, she described her father as abusive. She said her mother and two sisters were subject to their father's rage and beatings.

In an opinion piece following her death, Navajo writer and activist Jacqueline Keeler wrote that Littlefeather's sisters disputed that their father had been abusive and that Littlefeather's account of her childhood seemed to have been taken from that of her father, who had grown up in poverty and whose own father was abusive.

== Early career ==
Aspiring to become an actress, Littlefeather picked up several radio and television commercial credits and joined the Screen Actors Guild. She later said that she "learned early in life that there was probably a place for me in the dramatic art field, acting [...] if you have a parent who's deaf, you naturally have to act out messages to them", referring to communicating with her father. In 1970, as "Sacheen Littlefeather of Alcatraz", she was named Miss Vampire USA, a promotion for House of Dark Shadows.

While living in the San Francisco Bay area in the early 1970s, Littlefeather participated in the 1971 American Indian Festival at Foothill College, judged a local 1972 beauty pageant as "Princess Littlefeather", and organized a 1972 American Indian Festival at the Palace of Fine Arts. She worked at a radio station, KFRC, for about six months and did freelance reporting for PBS member station KQED.

Playboy magazine planned a spread called "10 Little Indians" in 1972, and one of the models was Littlefeather, but the spread was cancelled. A year later in October 1973, due to her Academy Award appearance fame, they ran the photographs of Littlefeather as a stand-alone feature. Littlefeather was personally criticized for what was seen as exploitation of her fame, but she explained that it was "strictly a business agreement" to earn the money needed to attend the World Theater Festival in Nancy, France. Looking back at the photo shoot, Littlefeather later said, "I was young and dumb."

In January 1973, she appeared in "Make-up for Minority Women' and was identified as a professional model. As a spokesperson for the National American Indian Council, she protested President Richard Nixon's budget cuts to federal Indian programs in February 1973. On March 6, 1973, she participated in a meeting between the Federal Communications Commission and members of several minority groups about the representation of minorities on television. In an interview published just before her Academy Awards appearance, she stated that she had helped send two Indian nurses to Wounded Knee and that she had relinquished her United States citizenship, along with seven Native Americans.

In 1975, Littlefeather reported that she was working on a movie script about Edward S. Curtis with Cap Weinberger, Jr, who had written an article about Curtis for Smithsonian magazine. She emceed an evening performance at the United National Indian Tribal Youth conference in Oklahoma City, Oklahoma, in 1976. She continued to pursue acting opportunities, such as touring with the "Red Earth Theater Company".

== 1973 Academy Awards speech ==
=== Background ===
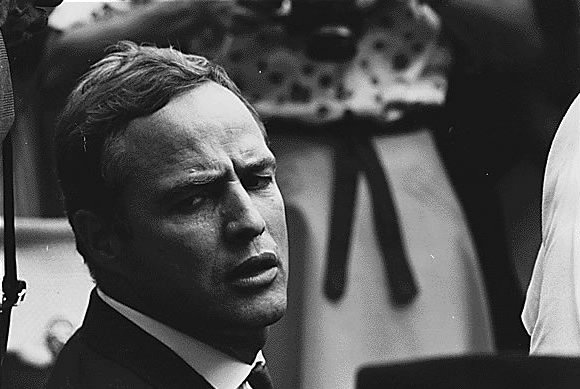
Marlon Brando at the March on Washington in 1963

Accounts of how Littlefeather initially met Marlon Brando vary. In one of her first interviews after the speech, she mentioned that they met "through his interest in the Indian movement". An account from the night of the Oscar ceremony describes Francis Ford Coppola observing Littlefeather on a TV monitor backstage and stating "Sacheen Littlefeather. She lives in San Francisco. She's a friend of mine that I introduced to B [...] She's an Indian princess."

A 1974 article about a Littlefeather interview stated that she was working for a San Francisco radio station when she applied for work with Coppola and that he then referred her to Brando, "knowing Brando's interest in the Indian". At the time of the Oscars, she had known Brando for nearly a year. Later accounts describe Coppola as Littlefeather's neighbor in San Francisco.

In a 2021 interview, Littlefeather said that she got to know Coppola while hiking the hills of San Francisco and she got Brando's address from him. Subsequently, she wrote Brando a letter, asking about his interest in Native American issues. In that account, he called the radio station where she worked months after she sent the letter. Littlefeather also said that she met Brando in Washington, D.C., where she was presenting to the Federal Communications Commission about minorities.

In 1972, Brando played Vito Corleone in The Godfather, which many critics consider one of the greatest films of all time. For the performance he was nominated for Best Actor at the 45th Academy Awards, which were presented on March 27, 1973, at the Dorothy Chandler Pavilion in Los Angeles, California. Before the ceremony, Brando decided that—as the favorite to win—he would boycott as a protest led by AIM against the ongoing siege at Wounded Knee and his views on how Native Americans were represented in American films. He called Littlefeather and asked her to appear on his behalf. "I was a spokesperson, so to speak, for the stereotype of Native Americans in film and television," she later said.

=== Awards ceremony ===
External videos
- Marlon Brando's Best Actor Oscar win for The Godfather on YouTube

Littlefeather joined the audience minutes before the award for Best Actor was announced. She was accompanied by Brando's secretary, Alice Marchak. She wore her long dark hair tied with Native-style beadwork, moccasins and a fringed and beaded buckskin dress. Producer Howard W. Koch, she later said, told her "you can't read all that" in reference to the 739-word speech written by Brando, so she condensed it all into 60 seconds. In other retellings of that night, Littlefeather said Koch told her that she had 60 seconds to deliver the speech or else she would be removed from the stage and arrested. Koch recalled that he permitted her to stay and make her speech after she promised not to make a scene.

The Best Actor award was presented by Norwegian actress Liv Ullmann and British actor Roger Moore. After giving brief remarks and announcing the five nominees, they declared Brando as the winner. Littlefeather walked onto the stage and raised her hand to decline the Oscar trophy that Moore offered her. Deviating from the prepared speech, she said the following:

Hello. My name is Sacheen Littlefeather. I'm Apache and I am president of the National Native American Affirmative Image Committee. I'm representing Marlon Brando this evening, and he has asked me to tell you in a very long speech which I cannot share with you presently, because of time, but I will be glad to share with the press afterwards, that he very regretfully cannot accept this very generous award. And the reasons for this being are the treatment of American Indians today by the film industry—excuse me... [booing and applause] and on television in movie re-runs, and also with recent happenings at Wounded Knee. I beg at this time that I have not intruded upon this evening, and that we will in the future, our hearts and our understandings will meet with love and generosity. Thank you on behalf of Marlon Brando. [applause]

Moore escorted Littlefeather off-stage, past several people critical of her, and towards the press. Littlefeather stated in 2022 that some people mockingly used the tomahawk chop towards her as she was led by. Koch and Oscar telecast director Marty Pasetta both later recalled that John Wayne was waiting in the wings and had to be restrained by six security guards to prevent him from forcing her off stage. This claim has since been disputed by film historian Farran Nehme and biographer Scott Eyman as a "persistent urban legend" which "never happened", having been created by Pasetta a year after the ceremony, "getting more exciting each time it was told". At a later press conference, Littlefeather read to journalists the speech that Brando had prepared; The New York Times published the full text the next day.

The incident drew remarks from others at the same ceremony. Later that night, before she announced the Best Actress winner, Raquel Welch said, "I hope the winner doesn't have a cause." When Clint Eastwood began presenting the Best Picture award, he joked, "I don't know if I should present this award on behalf of all the cowboys shot in all the John Ford Westerns over the years." Michael Caine, the night's co-host, criticized Brando for "letting some poor little Indian girl take the boos" instead of "[standing] up and [doing] it himself".

=== Reception and legacy ===
The audience in the Dorothy Chandler Pavilion was divided between applause and jeers. Brando and Littlefeather's protest was generally considered inappropriate for the awards ceremony. "I was distressed that people should have booed and whistled and stomped, even though perhaps it was directed at myself," Brando later told Dick Cavett. "They should have at least had the courtesy to listen to her." Her appearance prompted the Academy of Motion Picture Arts and Sciences to rule out future proxy acceptance of Academy Awards (Oscars for winners unable to accept in person are now accepted on their behalf by the presenters).

After giving the speech, Littlefeather spent two days in Los Angeles before returning to San Francisco. She later said that she visited Marlon Brando's house after the Academy Awards and bullets were fired into his front door while they were talking.

According to Ann Brebner of the Brebner Agency, which handled Littlefeather's modeling bookings, she was deluged with mail and phone calls after her Oscars appearance, which led to radio and television appearances as well as the opportunity to read for several film roles. In the years immediately following the protest, Littlefeather said that it had "had little effect on the course of her career". Later, though, Littlefeather said she was blacklisted by the Hollywood community and received threats. She also said that media reports published several falsehoods, such as that she was not Native American or had rented the outfit for the occasion. She said that the federal government encouraged the blacklisting to abate Native American activism after Wounded Knee.

Littlefeather credited the speech with bringing attention back to the situation at Wounded Knee, though news coverage of the standoff at the time makes little mention of Littlefeather or Brando. Russell Means contended that "Marlon Brando and Sacheen Littlefeather totally uplifted" the lives of those at Wounded Knee. Actor Jay Silverheels, who played Tonto in The Lone Ranger and later founded the Indian Actors Workshop, commented that he did not think Littlefeather's appearance at the Oscars "did any harm or any particular good. I knew Sacheen and I don't think it was her idea at all—I am sure Brando recruited her".

At The Comedy Awards in 2012, comedian Norm Macdonald staged a parody of the speech in accepting an award on behalf of Melissa McCarthy.

Coretta Scott King commended Brando for his non-violent stand, stating, "It is gratifying to see people in entertainment increasingly concerned about injustices in society and not just interested in making money." Many years later, Littlefeather said that King called her to thank her for the speech. In 2016, the 88th ceremony of the Academy Awards drew criticism for lack of diversity in nominations; actress Jada Pinkett Smith, who boycotted the ceremony, cited Littlefeather as inspiration to do so.

In June 2022, the Academy sent Littlefeather a statement of apology, in which the organization's then-president David Rubin wrote: "The abuse you endured because of this statement was unwarranted and unjustified. The emotional burden you have lived through and the cost to your own career in our industry are irreparable. For too long the courage you showed has been unacknowledged. For this, we offer both our deepest apologies and our sincere admiration." The statement was read in full at An Evening with Sacheen Littlefeather on September 17, an event honoring Littlefeather and featuring a conversation between her and producer Bird Runningwater, the co-chair of the Academy's Indigenous Alliance. She also recorded an episode for the Academy Museum's podcast and a visual history for the Academy Oral History Projects.

She described the Academy's apology to her as "a dream come true", and said that "we Indians are very patient people—it's only been 50 years!" She added, "We need to keep our sense of humor about this at all times. It's our method of survival."

At the 95th Academy Awards ceremony in 2023, the Academy did not recognize Littlefeather during its in memoriam segment.

== Later career and activism ==
Littlefeather was described as a founding member of the Red Earth Indian Theater Company in Seattle when awarded an Eagle Spirit Award (Honorary) at the 2013 American Indian Film Festival. Contemporary accounts of the founding of the Red Earth Performing Arts Company by Nez Perce actor and playwright John Kauffman, Jr in 1974 do not mention Littlefeather. In 1978, it was reported that Littlefeather would travel to Newfoundland with the Greenpeace Foundation to protest the Newfoundland seal hunt along with politicians and other show business personalities. She served as an advisor to PBS's Dance in America: Song for Dead Warriors (1984), which earned its choreographer, Michael Smuin, an Emmy Award.

As a staff member of the American Indian Center, Littlefeather participated in a conference about American Indians in media at the Hotel San Franciscan in 1978. As the director of the First Nation Education Resource Center in San Francisco, Littlefeather commented on a letter from two American Indians in Oakland that was handed to Nelson Mandela, stating that the letter outlined problems facing American Indians, including healthcare and unemployment. The letter, signed by Betty Cooper, director of the American Indian alcoholism program, and Sally Gallegos, director of the Consortium of United Indian Nations, was credited with Mandela's decision to meet with American Indian leaders in October 1990.

She continued doing activism and became a respected member of California's Native American community. She played a role in the mascot change at Tamalpais High School in the late 1980s, first becoming involved when she visited the high school as a guest director for the drama class play, "Grandmother Earth". She criticized the use of an Indian-themed mascot at Tomales High in 2001. In the 1980s, she led prayer circles for Kateri Tekakwitha, the first Native American Catholic saint.

A 1987 profile of Littlefeather stated that she was a recipient of the 1986 Traditional Indian Medicine Achievement Award for her participation in the Traditional Indian Medicine Program at St. Mary's Hospital in Tucson, Arizona. Although St. Mary's Hospital and Health Center did receive an Achievement Citation from the Catholic Health Association of the United States in 1986 for Traditional Indian Medicine's Role in the Carondelet Health System, an article about the award only mentions the initiator of the program, Apache nurse Belinda Acosta, and the program coordinator, Ann Hubbert. Littlefeather also described herself as one of the original teachers in St. Mary's Traditional Indian Medicine program, which consisted of a series of conferences held between 1984 and 1990 and was coordinated by Comanche medicine man Edgar Monetathchi, Jr, who worked for the Indian Health Service and was the first medicine man to be employed full-time by a Catholic hospital.

In 1988, she served as the secretary and community member-at-large on the interim board of directors of the American Indian AIDS Institute of San Francisco. Around this same time period, Littlefeather worked at the Gift of Love AIDS hospice in San Francisco, which was founded in 1988 by Mother Teresa, and had the opportunity to meet Mother Teresa during at least one of her five visits to the facility before her death in 1997. She campaigned against obesity, alcoholism, and diabetes, and specifically assisted Native Americans with AIDS. In 1990, it was reported that Littlefeather's brother had died of AIDS. Obituaries for Littlefeather's father and maternal grandmother do not mention a biological son in the family, only Littlefeather and her two younger sisters.

In a 1991 article, Littlefeather was credited with co-founding the American Indian Registry for Performing Arts. The registry was founded in the early 1980s by Muscogee actor Will Sampson, who worked with the American Native Association to publish a directory of American Indians in the arts and entertainment fields. Littlefeather reported in 1991 that she was working on two shows for PBS, Remember Me Forever and The Americas Before Columbus, both scheduled for broadcast in 1992. Littlefeather participated in events related to a year-long celebration of the Americas before Columbus, but there is no record of a PBS show by either name being broadcast in 1992. In 2009, she gave testimony in the documentary Reel Injun about Native Americans in film.

In 2015, Littlefeather reported that her name and image were being used fraudulently to raise money claimed to be for the Lakota nation. The money raised was never donated to any campaign.

In November 2019, she received the Brando Award, which recognizes individuals for their contributions to the American Indian, from the Red Nation International Film Festival. She participated in events commemorating the 50th anniversary of the Occupation of Alcatraz, including serving as head pow wow judge. Author Tommy Orange was commissioned by the San Francisco Museum of Modern Art's Open Space platform to write a piece called "Dear Marlon Brando" as part of the magazine Alcatraz Is Not an Island, commemorating the 50th anniversary. In the piece, a character from Orange's novel There, There writes to Brando about what it meant to see Littlefeather at the Oscars.

== Personal life ==
In 1973, Littlefeather was married to engineer Michael Rubio. She was later in a 32-year-long relationship with and married Charles Koshiway Johnston, who died in 2021.

Littlefeather studied orthomolecular nutrition and later said that she had "wanted to see where all the 'white' food came from" so she went to Sweden and lived in Stockholm. She stated that she wanted to travel in Europe to "see where the white people came from" just as people are "always going to reservations to see where the Indians came from". While traveling, she became interested in the food of other cultures and noted similarities between foods such as Spanish buñuelos and American Indian fry bread as well as Russian pirozhki and the meat pies made by her Kiowa friends.

=== Health problems and death ===
Over the years, Littlefeather described her personal experiences with serious health issues, including internal bleeding, collapsed lungs, and cancer. She reported having tuberculosis at age four and received treatment in an oxygen tent while hospitalized. She stated that she was suicidal and hospitalized in a mental institution for a year. In 1974, she stated that Marlon Brando sent her to a doctor when she was in a lot of pain and helped her recover, so she made the Oscar speech to repay him.

At the age of 29 her lungs collapsed. After recovering, she received a degree from Antioch University in holistic health and nutrition with an emphasis in Native American medicine, a practice she credited with her recovery. In 1991, Littlefeather was reported to be recovering from radical cancer surgery. A 1999 article stated she had developed colon cancer in the early 1990s.

In 2018, Littlefeather developed stage IV breast cancer, a recurrence of the breast cancer from which she was reported to be in remission in 2012. She said in a 2021 interview that the cancer had metastasized to her right lung and that she was terminal.

Littlefeather died at her home in Novato, California on October 2, 2022, at the age of 75.

== Ancestry dispute ==
Following Littlefeather's death, Navajo author Jacqueline Keeler interviewed Littlefeather's biological sisters Rosalind Cruz and Trudy Orlandi, who claim that their family has no Native American ancestry. Keeler writes that, according to Littlefeather's sisters, their father was born in Oxnard, California, was of Mexican descent and had no tribal ties, nor was he related to the Yaqui tribes of Northern Mexico. Furthermore, Cruz claimed that it was her belief that Littlefeather fabricated a Native identity because she thought it was more "prestigious" to be Native American than to be Hispanic. Keeler searched records of Littlefeather's family going back to 1850 and did not find evidence of Native ancestry. Although some of Littlefeather's distant family may have been born in Pima/O’odham tribal territory in Sonora, Mexico, scholars have suggested that actual tribal members in these communities would have been a minority during the time. According to Liza Black, an associate professor of history and Native American and Indigenous studies at Indiana University, and a citizen of the Cherokee Nation, "Keeler proves Littlefeather was a troubled woman who made the stories of others her own". The Pascua Yaqui Tribe stated that while neither Littlefeather nor her parents were enrolled tribal members, "that does not mean that we could independently confirm that she is not of Yaqui ancestry generally, from Mexico or the Southwestern United States".

Roger Ebert had disputed Littlefeather's Native American ethnicity in 2004 in an obituary for Marlon Brando, stating that after her attendance at the Oscars she was "identified as Maria Cruz, an actress who was not an Indian". He subsequently published a letter received from Littlefeather's lawyer, which asked him to clarify that Littlefeather was Native American, with a father who was "Yaqui and White Mountain Apache". The lawyer's letter claimed that Cruz was her married name. However, on her official website, a response to Ebert's article contradicts the lawyer and states that she was born Maria Cruz. In the statement, Littlefeather continued to claim to be Yaqui and White Mountain Apache.

Because Littlefeather had been a prominent activist, these allegations caused mixed reactions. Academic and journalist Dina Gilio-Whitaker, who studies Native Americans in the U.S., wrote that the truth about community leaders is "crucial", even if it means losing a "hero", and that the work Littlefeather did is still valuable, but there is a need to be honest about the harm done by false claims of Indigenous identity. Gilio-Whitaker specified:

The stereotype Littlefeather embodied depended on non-Native people not knowing what they were looking at, or knowing what constitutes legitimate American Indian identity. There is a pattern that "pretendians" follow: They exploit people's lack of knowledge about who American Indian people are by perpetuating ambiguity in a number of ways. Self-identification, or even DNA tests, for instance, obscure the fact that American Indians have not only a cultural relationship to a specific tribe and the United States but a legal one. Pretendians rarely can name any people they are related to in a Native community or in their family tree. They also just blatantly lie. Pretendianism is particularly prevalent in entertainment, publishing and academia. [...] Harm is caused when resources and even jobs go to fakes instead of the people they were intended for.

— Dina Gilio-Whitaker

There have been calls for revisions or removal of the exhibition featuring a tribute to Littlefeather at the Academy Museum of Motion Pictures and questions raised about "the organization's commitment to historical accuracy". Historians and activists say the allegations should "prompt the Academy to investigate and determine whether it should amend its presentation of Littlefeather in its gallery spaces or in podcast and video interviews posted on its official channel". As the 50th anniversary of Littlefeather’s appearance at the Oscars neared, her sisters reiterated their claim that Littlefeather had falsely maintained a Native American identity. In a February 2023 letter, Littlefeather's sister Trudi Orlandi asked the Academy to remove the tribute from its museum gallery. As of March 7, 2023, Orlandi had yet to receive a reply.

On March 6, 2024, newly publicized research indicated that Littlefeather may in fact have had Indigenous Mexican roots, citing church records showing that her great-great-grandfather was listed as "Yaquis criollos de la tierra" in 1815. In response, Keeler stated that the wording does not necessarily imply Indigenous origin, and that the family may have been Spanish migrants to Mexico.

== Filmography ==
List of film appearances
Year	Title	Role	Notes	Ref.
1970	House of Dark Shadows	Minor role		
1971	The Gang That Couldn't Shoot Straight	Minor role		
1973	Counselor at Crime	Maggie		
1973	The Laughing Policeman	Minor role	Uncredited	
1974	Freebie and the Bean	Minor role	Uncredited	
1974	The Trial of Billy Jack	Patsy Littlejohn		
1975	Johnny Firecloud	Nenya		
1975	Winterhawk	Pale Flower		
1978	Shoot the Sun Down	Navajo Woman		
2009	Reel Injun	Herself	Documentary	
2018	Sacheen: Breaking the Silence	Herself	Short documentary	
