= Circe Sturm =

American academic from Texas, U.S.

Circe Sturm Ph.D.
- Born: Houston, Texas, U.S.
- Citizenship: American
- Occupations: Anthropologist, actress

Academic background
- Education: University of California, Davis (Ph.D.)

Academic work
- Discipline: Anthropology
- Institutions: University of Texas, Austin
- Main interests: Anthropology, racial studies, Native American studies

Circe Sturm is a professor in the Department of Anthropology, University of Texas, Austin. She is also an actress, appearing mainly in films and commercials.

== Background ==
Circe Dawn Sturm was born in Houston, Texas. She has described herself as being of mostly German and Sicilian descent, and having Mississippi Choctaw descent through her grandmother, previously mentioning her grandmother also having "very distant" Cherokee heritage. In 2025, Tribal Alliance Against Frauds researched her genealogical background, and found no evidence of Choctaw or Cherokee ancestry. In response, Sturm noted her writing was from the perspective of an anthropologist, rather than a Native American, and that she claimed descendancy, not tribal citizenship, citing family history and a consumer DNA test.

== Career ==
Sturm writes about Cherokee identity politics and race shifting. Blood Politics presents results of her ethnographic fieldwork in the Cherokee Nation from 1995 to 1998. Becoming Indian (2011) discusses the concept of race shifting in more detail. Sturm has been interviewed on issues relating to Cherokee identity, such as the Cherokee Freedmen controversy and Elizabeth Warren's claims to Cherokee ancestry.

Sturm also conducts ethnographic research on Italian Americans. Her most recent book, Texas Tavola (2006), discusses Sicilian American festivals and foodways.

Before joining UT Austin, Sturm taught at the University of Oklahoma. Sturm and Craig Cambell launched a project called Mapping Indigenous Texas, to created an interactive tool to teach about Native American tribes in Texas.

== Awards and honors ==
In 2003, the American Council of Learned Societies named Strum as a ACLS Fellow for her project "Claiming redness: the racial and cultural politics of becoming Cherokee". In 2011, the Southern Anthropological Society gave Circe Strum a James Mooney Award for her book Becoming Indian: The Struggle over Cherokee Identity in the Twenty-first Century.

In 2024, the University of Texas at Austin awarded Sturm and Craig Campbell a 2023–2024 Research & Creative Grant for their project Mapping Indigenous Texas.

== Selected publications ==
=== Books ===
- Blood Politics: Race, Culture and Identity in the Cherokee Nation of Oklahoma
- Becoming Indian: The Struggle over Cherokee Identity in the Twenty-First Century
- Say, Listen: Writing as Care by the Black Indigenous 100s Collective (2024), contributor
- Texas Tavola: Sicilian American Rituals of Food, Faith, and Family (2026)

=== Chapters ===
- Circe Sturm (1996). "Old Writing and New Messages: The Role of Hieroglyphic Literacy in Maya Cultural Activism". In Fischer, Edward F.; Brown, R. McKenna (eds.). Maya Cultural Activism in Guatemala,. Austin: University of Texas Press. pp. 114–30. ISBN 9780292767669.

=== Journal essays ===
- Sturm, Circe, ed. (2019). "Rethinking Blackness and indigeneity in the light of settler colonial theory". American Indian Culture and Research Journal. 43 (2). Los Angeles, CA: University of California–Los Angeles. doi:10.17953/aicrj.43.2.sturm.

=== Articles ===
- Sturm, Circe (August 2014). "RACE, SOVEREIGNTY, AND CIVIL RIGHTS: Understanding the Cherokee Freedmen Controversy". Cultural Anthropology. 29 (3): 575–98. doi:10.14506/ca29.3.07.
- Sturm, Circe (September 2022). "I've Been Here All the While: Black Freedom on Native Land by Alaina E. Roberts (review)". Native American and Indigenous Studies. 9 (2): 148. doi:10.1353/nai.2022.a863596. OCLC 9893016390., peer-reviewed
- Sturm, Circe (August 19, 2017). "Reflections on the Anthropology of Sovereignty and Settler Colonialism: Lessons from Native North America". Cultural Anthropology. 32 (3): 340–48. doi:10.14506/ca32.3.03. ISSN 1548-1360., peer-reviewed
- Sturm, Circe; Di Fiore, Anthony (March 16, 2022). "Why is Lieutenant Governor Dan Patrick so afraid of US history?". Visible.

== See also ==
- Blood quantum laws
- Cherokee descent
- Detribalization
- Native American identity in the United States
- Unrecognized tribes
