= Pretendian =

Pejorative term for Indigenous identity frauds

"Pretendian" is a pejorative colloquialism for a person who engages in Indigenous identity fraud. A pretendian is a non-Indigenous person who falsely and publicly claims an Indigenous identity. The word "pretendian" is a portmanteau of the words "pretend" and "Indian".

== Background ==
In the United States, Indigenous identity fraud often involves an individual falsely and publicly claiming to be Native American. In Canada, indigenous identity fraud can involve a person falsely and publicly claiming to be a First Nations person, to be Métis, or to be Inuit. Indigenous identity fraud is considered an extreme form of cultural appropriation, especially if a pretendian asserts that they can represent and speak for communities from which they do not originate.

In April 2018, APTN National News in Canada investigated how pretendians – in the film industry and in real life – promote "stereotypes, typecasting, and even what is known as 'redface'." In 2019, Rebecca Nagle (Cherokee Nation) wrote the following for High Country News:

Pretendians perpetuate the myth that Native identity is determined by the individual, not the tribe or community, directly undermining tribal sovereignty and Native self-determination. To protect the rights of Indigenous people, pretendians...must be challenged and the retelling of their false narratives must be stopped.

In 2020, United States Poet Laureate Joy Harjo (Mvskoke) wrote:

We ... have had to contend with an onslaught of what we call 'Pretendians', that is, non-Indigenous people assuming a Native identity. DNA tests are setting up other problems involving those who discover Native DNA [sic] in their bloodline. When individuals assert themselves as Native when they are not culturally Indigenous, and if they do not understand their tribal nation's history or participate in their tribal nation's society, who benefits? Not the people or communities of the identity being claimed. It is hard to see this as anything other than an individual's capitalist claim, just another version of a colonial offense.

Jordan Molot of Concordia University, citing the sociologist Megan Scribe, has written that "settler moves to indigeneity" are common in multiple settler-colonial societies, perceiving a link between "the “Pretendian” phenomenon seen in North America" and "Zionist claims of indigeneity in Israel". One example of the problem is seen with the Cherokee people, where in 2020, the total combined population of the three federally recognized Cherokee tribal nations in the United States was over 460,000, but people in the US who self-identified as "Cherokee" in the 2020 U.S. census was over 1.5 million.

== Related terms ==
Additional slang terms have emerged from the term "pretendian". A "defendian" is a person who defends pretendians, while a "Karendian" is a person who calls out pretendians. A "descendian" is a person with distant Indigenous ancestry who is not a member of the Indigenous nation with which they claim to be affiliated.

== "Alleged Pretendians List" ==
In January 2021, Navajo journalist Jacqueline Keeler began investigating the problem of settler self-indigenization in academia. Working with other Natives in tribal enrollment departments, genealogists and historians, she began following up on the names many had been hearing for years in tribal circles that were not actually Native, asking about current community connections as well as researching family histories "as far back as the 1600s" to see if they had any ancestors who were Native or had ever lived in a tribal community. This research resulted in the creation of the "Alleged Pretendians List" of about 200 public figures in academia and entertainment, which Keeler self-published as a Google spreadsheet in 2021.

Artist Nadema Agard, who is named on the Alleged Pretendians List, has criticized Keeler for allegedly conducting a "witch hunt". However, Native leaders interviewed by Voice of America, such as Chief Ben Barnes of the Shawnee Tribe, have said that Keeler has strong support in Native circles. Academic Dina Gilio-Whitaker, who reviewed Keeler's documentation on Sacheen Littlefeather before it was published, found Keeler's research to be sound. Keeler has stressed that the Alleged Pretendians List does not include private citizens who are "merely wannabes", but only those public figures who are monetizing and profiting from their claims to tribal identity and who claim to speak for Native American tribes. She has said that the list is the product of decades of Native peoples' efforts at accountability.

Academic Kim TallBear writes that the Alleged Pretendians List documents the fact that the overwhelming majority of those who benefit financially from pretendianism are white, and that these false claims relate to white supremacy and Indigenous erasure. Tallbear stresses that pretendians are in no way the same as disconnected and reconnecting descendants who have real heritage, such as victims of government programs that scooped Indigenous children from their families.

Skeptics of the Alleged Pretendians List have challenged its reliability and questioned the methodology and motivations of Keeler. Some skeptics released a signed statement via Last Real Indians accusing Keeler of exploiting the issue of Indigenous fraud—which they acknowledged "had long been a problem in Indian Country"—to further her own personal agenda. Signees argued that Keeler was weaponizing "lateral violence, colonial trauma, and colonial recognition" against people she disagreed with or had prior disputes with. Keeler was also accused of promoting herself as a "self-appointed arbiter of Indian identity", with the statement eventually requesting that Keeler "respect the rights of every tribe, and urban inter-tribal communities to determine their own people, kin and citizenship".

In "Who made the Pretendian?", Lakota journalist Alexandra Watson wrote that an article she had written was used for reference in the Alleged Pretendians List without her consent. Watson asserted that her writing should not be construed as an endorsement of the list and questioned the list's methodology and usefulness.

In an op-ed for Powwows.com, Northern Cheyenne journalist Angelina Newsom wrote that Keeler had questioned the tribal enrollment of the Native politician Ben Nighthorse Campbell and included him in her research despite the fact that Campbell was a member of a federally recognized tribe. Newsom accused Keeler of lacking proper documentation as well as using Ancestry.com records in part of her research. She added that the publication of private information could also "negatively impact the actual Native folks listed as relatives and in-laws". Newsom argued that tribes should be in charge of investigating citizenship claims, claiming that Keeler's method--which Newsom believed implicated people who were verifiably Native--wasn't "safe for Indian Country".

== Heritage groups and state-recognized tribes ==
In a 2023 report, the federally recognized Delaware Nation referred to state-recognized Lenape tribes and Lenape heritage groups as CPAINs (Corporations Posing as Indigenous Nations), stating that "If a “pretendian” is an individual who falsely claims indigenous lineage, then CPAIN is what happens when a group of “pretendians” decide to form a corporation, usually a non-profit, and pass it off to the public as a tribe."

== See also ==
- Ghost Warrior Society
- Indigenous identity fraud
- Racial misrepresentation
- The Pretendians (2022) documentary
- 1896 Applications for Enrollment, Five Tribes (Overturned)
- Eatock v Bolt, an Australian case involving writings that suggested false claims of Aboriginal descent
- Cherokee Nation Truth in Advertising for Native Art, a law passed by the Cherokee Nation about marketing products as Indian-made
