= Jacqueline Keeler =

Native American author and activist

- Born: Cleveland, Ohio
- Citizenship: Navajo Nation, U.S.
- Education: Dartmouth College
- Occupations: Writer, activist
- Organization: Eradicating Offensive Native Mascotry

Jacqueline Keeler is a Native American writer and activist, enrolled in the Navajo Nation and of Yankton Dakota descent, who co-founded Eradicating Offensive Native Mascotry (EONM), which seeks to end the use of Native American racial groups as mascots.

== Early life ==
Keeler was born in Cleveland, Ohio, to parents who had been moved there as part of the Bureau of Indian Affairs Indian relocation programs of the 1950s and 1960s. She is also a graduate of Dartmouth College and has written about recent events there regarding the Native American Program.

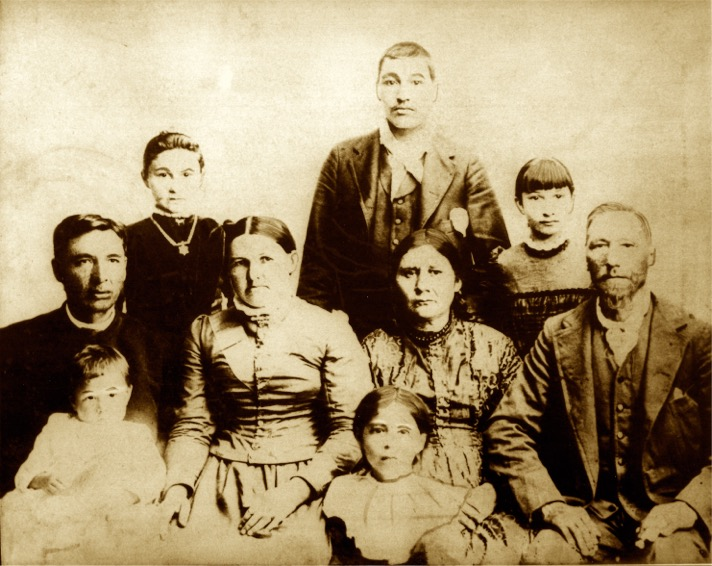
Members of the Deloria-Sully family.

She is Kinyaa'áanii (Towering House clan) and a citizen of the Navajo Nation. Her mother's family is from Cameron, Arizona, and she is a descendant of Gus Big Horse through her grandmother Jean Big Horse Canyon, a rug weaver. Her grandparents were traditional Diné who did not speak English and ran a ranch near the south rim of the Grand Canyon. Her father was a citizen of the Yankton Sioux Tribe from Lake Andes, South Dakota.

Her grandmother Marjorie Keeler was from a prominent Episcopalian Dakota family. She was the first cousin of Standing Rock Lakota historian Vine Deloria Jr., niece of Yankton Dakota ethnologist and linguist Ella Deloria, and niece of the Rev. Vine Deloria Sr. She was also the niece of the Rev. Charles Cook. Cook, the Yankton Dakota minister at Pine Ridge who, with fellow Dakota Dr. Charles Eastman, oversaw the welfare of Lakota survivors of the Wounded Knee Massacre in 1890. Marjorie Keeler was also the great-niece of Rosebud Lakota author Susan Bordeaux Bettelyoun.

== Career and activism ==
Keeler's articles have been widely quoted and published. Much of her writing has coincided with her activism.

Keeler co-founded Eradicating Offensive Native Mascotry, which launched and trended the hashtag #NotYourMascot during the 2014 Super Bowl. EONM seeks to end the use of racial groups as mascots, as well as other stereotypical representations in popular culture, and cultural appropriation. Keeler wrote "'Native Mascotry' is a term I coined to describe the practices that surround a Native mascot. It’s not just about the static image of the mascot, be it somewhat noble and prosaic or an ugly caricature with a feather on top. It’s the creative license such mascots gives fans to reenact outdated stereotypes, to 'play Indian.' These practices include: the wearing of Redface, the misuse of Native regalia and the chanting of fake, hokey war chants and tomahawk chops." Keeler has been interviewed by various media outlets about the topics of racial stereotypes.

Her activism also extends to issues of abortion, traditional Native values and Indigenous rights, and issues of Indigenous sovereignty.

=== Investigation into self-Indigenization ===
In 2021 Keeler began investigating the issue of settler self-Indigenization in academia. Speaking with Voice of America, she said, "As a reporter, I'd be working on a story about someone, only to find out that person wasn't actually Native." Working with other Natives in tribal enrollment departments, genealogists and historians, they began following up on the names many had been hearing for years in tribal circles were not actually Native, asking about current community connections as well as researching family histories "as far back as the 1600s" to see if they had any ancestors who were Native or had ever lived in a tribal community.

==== Alleged Pretendians List ====
This research resulted in the Alleged Pretendians List, of about 200 public figures in academia and entertainment, which Keeler self-published as a Google spreadsheet in 2021. Some people have criticized her for "conducting a witch hunt". Johnnie Jae, and others, have questioned the research and motives of the list, as well as what they say is anti-Black bias. VOA, interviewing several Native leaders, reports Keeler has strong support in Native circles. Keeler has stressed that the list does not include private citizens who are "merely wannabes", but only those public figures who are monetizing and profiting from their claims to tribal identity and who claim to speak for Native American tribes.

In an interview with APTN, Keeler said she and her team decided to compile the Alleged Pretendians list (stressing the "Alleged") to show how pervasive the problem is - that numerous non-Natives are profiting off fraud, are in positions of authority in academia, film and television and that non-Native individuals with no connections to the communities they claim are "positioning themselves as our spokespeople on National and International issues." She says the list is the product of decades of Native peoples' efforts at accountability.

== Author ==
Keeler is the author of Standoff: Standing Rock, the Bundy Movement, and the American Story of Sacred Lands. Praised by Ojibwe author Louise Erdrich: "Rigorous analysis and personal storytelling invigorate Jacqueline Keeler's examination of Indigenous vs. colonial land tenure. Standoff recounts the historic legacy of treaty rights and sacred space underpinning Standing Rock's case against the Dakota Access Pipeline, and contrasts this legacy with the white entitlement as well as cultural land desecrations of the Bundy movement. Standoff is a powerful, illuminating book."

In 2017, she also edited Edge of Morning: Native Voices Speak for the Bears Ears featuring fifteen contributors: multi-generational writers, poets, activists, teachers, students, and public officials examining tribal efforts to protect the Bears Ears by making it a national monument.
