= Wabanquot (Chippewa chief) =

Wab-Bon-Au-Quot (White Cloud)
- Mississippi Chippewa/Ojibwa chief
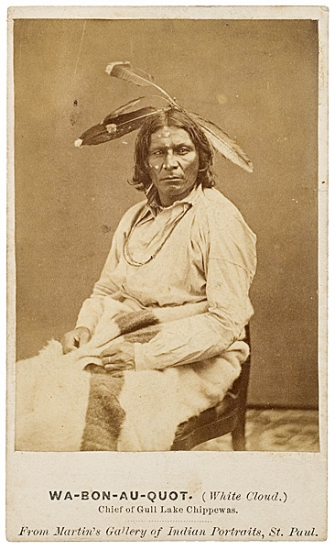
- Chief of the Gull Lake Chippewa 1862
- Born: ca. 1830; Gull Lake Wisconsin Territory
- Died: October 7, 1898; White Earth Indian Reservation
- Father: Waubojeeg

Wabanquot, Wabonaquod, Wah-bon-ah-quot, Wau-bon-a-quat or Wa-bon-o-quot (ca. 1830-1898) was an Ojibwa chief. Wabanquot (from the Ojibwe Waabaanakwad: White Cloud) was born at Gull Lake, Minnesota, around 1830. He succeeded to the office of chief of the Ojibwa at the death of his father, Waubojeeg, one of the principal chiefs for the Gull Lake Band of Mississippi Chippewa.

After the Dakota War of 1862, the Gull Lake Band was removed to the Leech Lake area. There, Wabanquot was considered by many to be the principal chief of the removed Mississippi bands of Chippewa. He was a signatory to the Treaty of Washington (1867) (16 Stat. 719), in which on June 14, 1868, he led his band to the White Earth Indian Reservation, where he lived until his death 30 years later.

Upon his supposed conversion to Christianity sometime in the 1870s, he adopted the name D.G. Wright after an Episcopalian benefactor, but he rarely used his English name; however, sometime in the 1890s before his death, he converted to Roman Catholicism.

Here stands the minister of God, says he comes here to take care of the Indians. Who is his God? Is he a greenback? That is what I am led to believe in my ignorance.

— Wabanquot, 1874, in asking about a clergyman who was an Indian agent

== Memorials ==
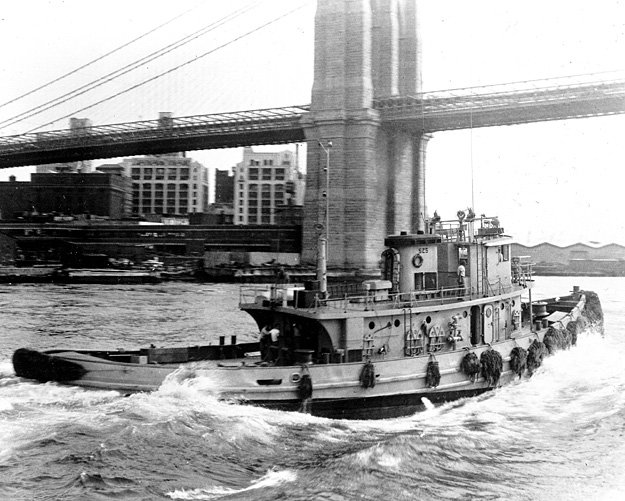
USS Wabanquot (YTB-525) Hisada class tug in New York harbor 1948-76.

- Chief White Cloud State Monument (47°04′42″N 95°51′02″W), in Becker County, in Calvary Catholic Cemetery of the St. Benedict's Mission, a mile south of White Earth, honoring Chippewa Chief White Cloud, was established in 1909. The monument inscription says:

Erected by the State of Minnesota appreciating a helpful, kindhearted, brainy man of true worth, born 1828 died Oct. 7, 1898.
Erected June 14, 1909 under the direction of D. A. Ball, Gus H. Beaulieu.

- The United States Navy tug USS Wabanquot, in service from 1945 to 1976, was named for him.
