= Sat-Okh =

Polish Resistance soldier and writer

- Born: c. 1920
- Died: 3 July 2003; Gdańsk, Poland
- Burial place: Srebrzysko Cemetery, Gdańsk, Poland
- Military career
- Allegiance: Polish Underground State
- Branch: Service for Poland's Victory (1939); Union of Armed Struggle (1939–1940); Home Army (1940–1945)
- Service years: 1939–1945
- Rank: Corporal
- Nickname: Kozak (Cossack)
- Units: 25th Infantry Regiment of the Home Army; 72nd Infantry Regiment of the Home Army
- Commands: Cross of Valour
- Conflicts: Second World War

Sat-Okh (c. 1920 – 3 July 2003), also known as Stanisław Supłatowicz, was a soldier in the Polish Resistance during World War II. Purportedly born in Northwest Territories, Canada, he later published autobiographical children's books under the name Sat-Okh. These were translated into several European languages.

He claimed to be Polish-Shawnee and to have grown up in Canada among First Nations people. His mother was Polish and returned with him to Poland before World War II. In the postwar years, he became an important figure in the Polish "indianist" movement. There has been considerable controversy as to whether his accounts were a hoax, as his books reflect culture and customs not associated with the peoples of the Northwest Territories.

== Early life ==
Stanisław Supłatowicz claimed to be born in Canada about 1922 as the son of a Polish mother, Stanisława Okulska, and a Shawnee father. Poland was within the sphere of the Russian Empire; after the Russian Revolution, Okulska was exiled to Siberia. She escaped to the east, making her way to Canada. There she was taken in by Native Americans, marrying a Shawnee man, and bringing up their three children among his people. The third child was Stanisław Supłatowicz. In the late 1930s Sat-Okh and his mother moved to Poland. Because Supłatowicz, as a Native American, did not have a Canadian citizenship, he had to create a birth certificate to gain the Polish one. In order to do it, his mother changed some of his data to hide his Native American ancestry.

== Military career ==
In 1939 Nazi Germany invaded Poland. Supłatowicz joined the Polish resistance movement. He was arrested by the Gestapo in 1940 and deported to Auschwitz-Birkenau. He escaped from the train transport on the way to the camp.

Supłatowicz joined the Home Army in Poland, where he gained a nickname Kozak because of his bravery and fighting style based on making traps. During World War II Supłatowicz earned several medals, including the Cross of Valour. After the war he was arrested and imprisoned by the communist regime for his participation in the Home Army. After his release, he enlisted in the Polish Navy, where he served for six years.

== Literary career ==
Under the name Sat Okh, Stanisław Supłatowicz published several autobiographical novels for children in Polish. They were translated into several European languages including Russian and were very popular in the former USSR. The books describe a boy's childhood and coming of age among the Shawnee in the Northwest Territories in the 1930s. Critics and reviewers of his work have noted that many of his descriptions are of First Nations life and customs associated with an earlier time period and with peoples of other geographical locations. The Shawnee do not live in the Northwest Territories.

Sat Okh died in Gdańsk on July 3, 2003.

His claims were later debunked by journalist and author Dariusz Rosiak.

== Works ==
- Ziemia słonych skał (The Land of Salt Rocks) (1958)
- Biały mustang (White Mustang) (1959)
- Dorogi skhodyat'sya (Roads Merge) (in Russian with Antonina Rasulova) (1973)
- Powstanie człowieka (The Emergence of Man) (1981)
- Fort nad Athabaską (Fort over Athabaska) (with Yackta-Oya) (1985)
- Głos prerii (Sounds of the Prairie) (1990)
- Tajemnica Rzeki Bobrów (The Mystery of Beaver River) (1996)
- Serce Chippewaya (Chippewa's Heart) (1999)
- Walczący Lenapa (Fighting Lenapa) (2001)

== See also ==
- Grey Owl
- The Education of Little Tree
