= Thompson River (Notawassi Lake tributary) =

River in Laurentides, Quebec, Canada

Location
- Country: Canada
- Province: Quebec
- Region: Laurentides
- MRC: Antoine-Labelle Regional County Municipality

Physical characteristics
- Source: Thompson Lake
  - location: Lac-Douaire
  - coordinates: 47°09′48″N 75°27′38″W
  - elevation: 379 m (1,243 ft)
- Mouth: Notawassi Lake
  - location: Lac-Douaire
  - coordinates: 47°06′52″N 75°28′31″W
  - elevation: 249 m (817 ft)
- Length: 13.7 km (8.5 mi)

Basin features
- Tributaries
  - left: (upstream) Ruisseau Vistule
  - right: (upstream) discharge from a small lake, discharge from three small lakes, stream.

The Thompson River is a tributary of the Notawassi Lake, flowing in the unorganized territory of Lac-Douaire, in the Antoine-Labelle Regional County Municipality, in the administrative region of Laurentides, in the province of Quebec, in Canada.

Forestry has always been the dominant economic activity in this sector. In the 19th century, recreational tourism activities were highlighted.

The surface of this river is usually frozen from the end of November to the end of March, except the rapids areas; however, safe traffic on the ice is generally from mid-December to mid-March.

== Geography ==
The Thompson River originates in Thompson Lake (length: 2.1 km (1.3 mi); altitude: 379 m (1,243 ft)) which is located in the territory of zec Lesueur, in the unorganized territory of Lac-Douaire. This deformed lake made in length includes a peninsula attached to the eastern shore and stretching for 0.4 km (0.25 mi) to the southwest. Lake Thompson is fed by the outlet (coming from the northwest) of several lakes: Rolt, Chevalier, Alida and an unidentified lake; as well as by the outlet (coming from the north) of Petit lac Thompson.

From Thompson Lake, the Thompson River descends on 13.7 km (8.5 mi), with a drop of 130 m (430 ft), according to the following segments:

- 3.1 km (1.9 mi) towards the south-east (leaving the territory of Zec Lesueur) up to a bend of the river corresponding to a stream (coming from the west); then east to Lake Farina which the current crosses for 0.5 km (0.31 mi) south to its mouth;
- 2.7 km (1.7 mi) south first, partially crossing Lake Farina (length: 0.8 km (0.50 mi); altitude: 263 m (863 ft));
- 7.9 km (4.9 mi) (or 2.7 km (1.7 mi) in a direct line) towards the southwest by forming numerous coils, collecting the discharge of three small lakes and collecting the discharge of a small lake, to its mouth.

== Toponymy ==
The term "Thompson" is a family name of British origin.

The Thompson river toponym was formalized on December 5, 1986, at the Place Names Bank of the Commission de toponymie du Québec.

== See also ==
- Baskatong Reservoir, a body of water
- Gatineau River, a stream
- Zec Lesueur, a controlled harvesting zone
- List of rivers of Quebec
