= Zec Petawaga =

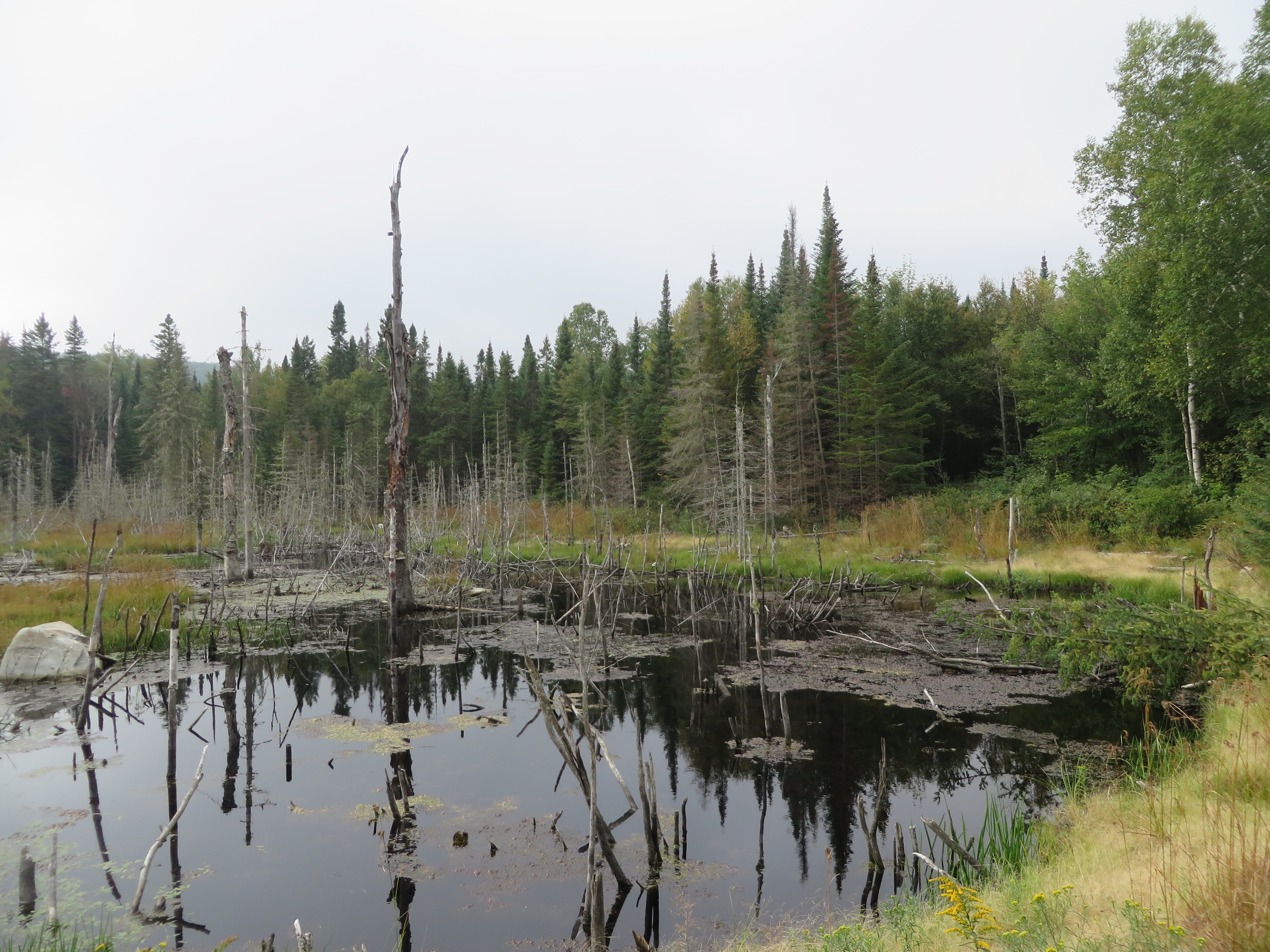

- Location within Quebec
- Location: Canada, Quebec, Antoine-Labelle Regional County Municipality
- Coordinates: 47°03′11″N 75°53′06″W
- Area: 1,186 square kilometres (458 sq mi)
- Established: 1978
- Governing body: Association Chasse et Pêche de la région de Mont-Laurier Inc.

The ZEC Petawaga is a "zone d'exploitation contrôlée" (controlled harvesting zone) located in the area of Mont-Laurier, in Antoine-Labelle Regional County Municipality, in the Laurentides, in Quebec, in Canada. Zec Petawaga straddles the municipality of Ferme-Neuve as well as the unorganized territories of Lac-Marguerite and Lac-Douaire.

The zec is managed by the "Association chasse et pêche de la région de Mont-Laurier inc". The zec was created in 1978 and covers an area of 1,186 square kilometres (458 sq mi).

== Geography ==
Zec Petawaga shares its boundaries with the Zec Lesueur in the east, La Verendrye Wildlife Reserve in the west. Its eastern border is the Baskatong Reservoir. The zec is bounded on the north by the free territory extending to Clova. Zec counts 314 lakes, of which a hundred are used for recreational fishing.

== History ==
Founded in 1952, the "l'association chasse et pêche de la région de Mont-Laurier inc" had originally the mission of seeding fishes. After organizing several sports-related activities and social in the region, the association has established the International Classic boat which attracted more than 15,000 people annually.

In 1978, the Quebec government entrusted the association is responsible for administering the ZEC Petawaga.

== Toponymy ==
Petawaga comes from the original word in Algonquin 'petwewegami'. This name was adopted for Petawaga Lake, which is located in the ZEC.

== Attachments ==
=== Related articles ===
- Mont-Laurier, municipality
- Antoine-Labelle Regional County Municipality, (MRC)
- Laurentides, an administrative region of Québec
- Baskatong Reservoir
- Zone d'exploitation contrôlée (Controlled harvesting zone) (ZEC)

=== External links ===
- Official website of the zec Petawaga.
