= Inconvenient Indian =

2020 Canadian documentary film

- Film poster
- Directed by: Michelle Latimer
- Written by: Michelle Latimer
- Based on: The Inconvenient Indian by Thomas King
- Produced by: Jesse Wente; Stuart Henderson; Justine Pimlott
- Narrated by: Thomas King
- Cinematography: Chris Romeike
- Edited by: Katie Chipperfield
- Music by: Brennan Mercer
- Production companies: 90th Parallel; National Film Board of Canada
- Release date: September 12, 2020 (TIFF)
- Country: Canada
- Language: English

Inconvenient Indian is a 2020 Canadian documentary film, directed by Michelle Latimer. It is an adaptation of Thomas King's non-fiction book The Inconvenient Indian, focusing on narratives of indigenous peoples of Canada. King stars as the documentary's narrator, with Gail Maurice and other indigenous artists appearing.

It premiered at the 2020 Toronto International Film Festival, where it won multiple accolades. The film uses a non-linear narrative style. The film was widely praised, particularly for Latimer's direction and perceived indigenous style and voice. Inconvenient Indian won various documentary awards at Canadian festivals.

In December 2020, following the emergence of questions around Latimer's claimed indigenous identity, the film was withdrawn from distribution. Further, in 2025, King was determined not to have any Indigenous ancestry.

== Content ==
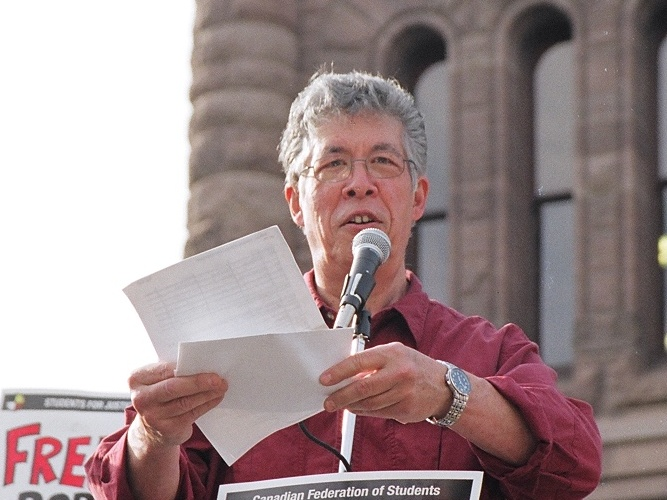
Author and activist Thomas King appears as himself in the film.

Inconvenient Indian blends scenes in which author and indigenous rights activist Thomas King, filmed in a taxi cab being driven by actress Gail Maurice in character as an indigenous trickster, narrates portions of his own book with video clips of historical representation of indigenous peoples as well as segments profiling modern figures, such as Kent Monkman, Christi Belcourt, A Tribe Called Red, Alethea Arnaquq-Baril and Nyla Innuksuk, who are reshaping the narrative with their contemporary work in art, music, literature and film. It does not follow a traditional documentary format, using evocative imagery instead of talking heads; King is never seen to speak, appearing on screen independent to his narration.

The film also uses dramatic juxtaposition to deliver its message, including scenes with King's narration overlaying an image of him eating popcorn while watching old film Westerns and following a scene of Dakota Access Pipeline protests with one of a man distributing seal meat to indigenous Canadian families, having previously clubbed it to ensure it was shot dead. Director Michelle Latimer said she did this to highlight the cruelty towards human protestors, as well as suggesting that mainstream society is more angered at cruelty towards animals (rather than people) because hunting allows indigenous peoples to be self-reliant and live their history outside of society in the present.

Maurice and Monkman appear as trickster figures in the film, both in a way Latimer described as gender bending and two-spirit; she incorporated Maurice's Coyote character and Monkman's alter ego Miss Chief Eagle Testickle to reflect on "the colonization of sexuality in Western culture", saying that "it was only with the onset of Christianity that we started to have judgment based on sexuality."

== Production ==
=== Development ===
Latimer told The Hollywood Reporter that she chose to make the documentary after having worked on her docu-series Rise, which also focused on indigenous issues, and wanting to make something that expounded on the topic rather than follow a real-time story. Latimer was inspired to use non-linear storytelling for this reason and from adapting King's book, which also has a circular storytelling style, saying: "In indigenous storytelling, we consider the storyteller and the listener to be one. And as you hear the story, the story becomes part of you and then you embellish that story and you tell it forward". She also said that taking a book to adapt is like being given instructions and "hones in [her] focus"; King's book is dense and Latimer chose to adapt its main themes through visual representation, rather than attempt to reproduce it all.

=== Filming ===
She told CBC News that a moment during filming of an art gallery scene "reminded [her] why she became a filmmaker"; they were recording Monkman's painting The Scream, which depicts a young indigenous child being taken from their parents by Royal Canadian Mounted Police, in the gallery when an indigenous girl of a similar age came to see it, being pulled away from the image by her parents in a way that seemed to mimic the painting. Latimer was inspired by the moment where life imitates art and by the knowledge that a hundred years ago the girl in the museum would be the one depicted in the painting, saying it showed the idea of circular storytelling and how "the history is right now. The future and the past — it's all right now".

=== Post-production ===
The score uses traditional Native music, including chants, strings, and drums. Sound designer and composer Brennan Mercer became involved with the film early in post-production before the rough cut was complete, so that the edit could visually respond to some of the sound he was designing. A lot of the film's editing process, using Latimer's regular collaborator Katie Chipperfield, was done remotely; Latimer said that they had to edit using screen-sharing over Zoom, but that this made the process more intimate as they could see each others' faces rather than only looking at the same screen. During the editing process, the George Floyd protests occurred; because of this, Latimer and Chipperfield decided to expand on the film's content of unrest, particularly the 2020 protests about Wetʼsuwetʼen land.

== Release ==
The film premiered at the 2020 Toronto International Film Festival (TIFF), where it won the People's Choice Award for Documentaries and the award for Best Canadian Film. Latimer said she would donate the CAD$10,000 Amplify Voices Best Canadian Feature Film prize to five emerging indigenous artists. At TIFF, she also premiered her television series Trickster, which Refinery29 and Latimer described as the answer to her own request, through Inconvenient Indian, for better indigenous Canadian representation. Latimer has expressed an interest in the film being used as an educational tool in schools.

=== Latimer controversy ===
Director Latimer's indigenous identity came into question when the press release for the film mentioned a specific connection to the Kitigan Zibi, which is not recognized by the community. Latimer claimed Métis and Algonquin heritage based on family oral history. According to members of the Kitigan Zibi Anishinabeg nation, erroneous claims of Algonquin ancestry in the community are common due to historical confusion with Baskatong, a French Catholic community north of Kitigan Zibi which was flooded by the creation of the Baskatong Reservoir in 1927. The film was set to have its international premiere at the 2021 Sundance Film Festival, but was indefinitely pulled from distribution by the National Film Board of Canada while Latimer's identity is investigated.

In 2022, the Aboriginal Peoples Television Network decided to proceed with a broadcast of the film, following consultations with the film's producers and Indigenous Screen Office director Jesse Wente. The film had its television premiere on April 8. Further, in 2025, King was determined not to have any Indigenous ancestry.

== Critical response ==
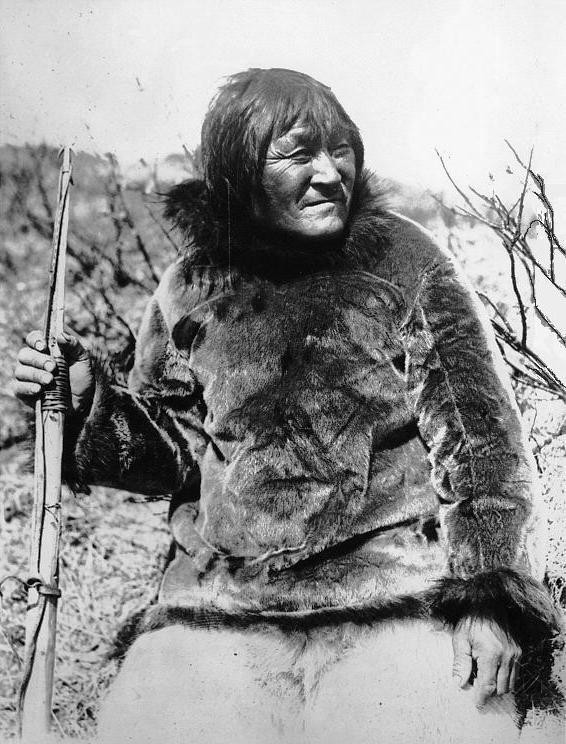
An image of Allakariallak, portrayed as "Nanook" in Nanook of the North; critics like Cinema Scope's Adam Nayman note the power of the gaze of indigenous peoples in Inconvenient Indian watching through the colonial lens of Nanook.

The film was named to TIFF's year-end Canada's Top Ten list for feature films. Barbara Goslawski, for That Shelf, wrote that "if there is only one must-see film at TIFF, it is [...] Inconvenient Indian."

For The Georgia Straight, Radheyan Simonpillai praised the film, comparing it to early documentaries and ethnographic films, like Robert Flaherty's Nanook of the North, which generally spread disinformation about indigenous communities; he said that "the propulsive and poetic lesson on how history frames Indigenous people [...] experiments with the doc form while challenging the genre's definition of truth and representation." Jude Dry of IndieWire called it "an evocative and visually ripe love poem to Canadian Indigenous culture", and Luke Gorham of In Review said that it "[justifies] its existence as a visual text" in a way many documentaries fail. Gorham and Alissa Wilkinson for Vox both opined that it tackles colonization of the image of indigenous peoples, noting that the medium of film is ideal for this reclamation, as film was originally how the narrative of indigenous people was taken away through processes including negative movie tropes.

Jason Gorber for /Film reflected on the successful conveyance of the documentary's purpose, saying that it is not optimistic for change but aims to educate on the realities of indigenous life past and present and "helps both showcase and celebrate a group of peoples too often presented as inconvenient at best, primed for extinction at the most heinous." Comparatively, Goslawski suggests that it "is the kind of film that inspires action [...] grounded in the promise of a better future." Brief Take's Daniel Reynolds opined that "we shouldn't need a film like Inconvenient Indian. Not in 2020, and not with Canada now at over 150 years old [...] What Latimer's film illustrates, however, is that [Indigenous people] are already doing more than just surviving in the face of this indifference – they're thriving."

Writing about the film's 2022 television broadcast, Barry Hertz of The Globe and Mail wrote that "I'll admit that not everyone will be open to approaching the film – and I'll confess here that I initially planned to include Inconvenient Indian on my list of the 10 best Canadian films of 2020, before shamefully balking during the controversy's first eruption. But if on this Canadian Screen Award weekend we are indeed asked to consider the state of the country's arts – where we have been, and where we might be heading – then watching Inconvenient Indian feels like an essential act."

== Awards and nominations ==
Year	Association	Award	Recipients	Result	Ref.
2020	Directors Guild of Canada	Allan King Award for Excellence in Documentary	Michelle Latimer	Won	
2020	Montreal International Documentary Festival	National Feature	Inconvenient Indian	Won	
2020	Montreal International Documentary Festival	Magnus Isacsson Award	Inconvenient Indian / Michelle Latimer	Won	
2020	Toronto International Film Festival	Amplify Voices Award: BIPOC Directors	Inconvenient Indian / Michelle Latimer	Nominated	
2020	Toronto International Film Festival	Best Canadian Feature Film	Inconvenient Indian	Won	
2020	Toronto International Film Festival	People's Choice Award: Documentaries	Inconvenient Indian	Won	
2020	Vancouver International Film Festival	Most Popular Canadian Documentary	Inconvenient Indian	Won	
