= Tribal Alliance Against Frauds =

Native American nonprofit organization

- Founded: 2022; 4 years ago
- Type: 501(c)(3) nonprofit organization
- Headquarters: North Carolina, US
- Executive director: Lianna Costantino
- Website: tribalallianceagainstfrauds.org

The Tribal Alliance Against Frauds (TAAF) is a nonprofit organization based in the United States that is dedicated to exposing individuals and organizations that have falsely claimed to be American Indian, as well as to educating the public on the harms to American Indian people and sovereignty caused by identity fraud. The organization states that it employs certified experts in American Indian genealogy to conduct genealogical investigations of individuals who have profited from fraudulent claims of American Indian heritage.

== About ==
TAAF is physically based in Cherokee, North Carolina, on the Qualla Boundary of the Eastern Band of Cherokee Indians (EBCI). TAAF is not a tribal program, nor is it endorsed by the EBCI or any other tribe. It is an independent watchdog organization. TAAF was founded in May 2022 and "leads a nationwide fight against people who it believes are fraudulently claiming to be Native," writes journalist Bill Donahue. According to the organization's official website, their mission is to investigate and expose non-American Indian people who "falsely represent American Indian cultures, histories, and spiritual practices and/or falsely claim American Indian identity as individuals for profit or fame."

People who falsely claim to be American Indians are often referred to as "Pretendians". Lianna Costantino, a citizen of the Cherokee Nation, is the organization's co-founder and executive director. In addition to their published findings, TAAF also maintains a list of several hundred suspected "Pretendians" who are in the process of being investigated.

== Investigations ==
TAAF has published a few dozen investigations into notable people who claimed ancestry.

=== Heather Rae ===
In March, 2023, TAAF issued a report that Heather Rae, known as a leading producer in American Indian circles in Hollywood, had fraudulently claimed to be of Cherokee descent. TAAF called for Rae to resign from her positions at American Indian organizations. In response, Rae stated in an interview with the Hollywood Reporter that she "began to really look into my family’s history in a deeper way" and was "still in that process, so for several years I have identified as an ally."

=== Kent Patrick Blansett ===
In July 2023, TAAF published findings alleging that Kent Patrick Blansett, a professor of Indigenous Studies and History at the University of Kansas, had fraudulently claimed to be of Potawatomi, Shawnee, Choctaw, Cherokee, and Muscogee ancestry. A genealogical tree going back six generations that was created by TAAF found no evidence of American Indian ancestry.

=== Erika T. Wurth ===
In October 2023, TAAF published genealogical findings indicating that the writer Erika T. Wurth had falsely claimed Apache, Chickasaw, and Cherokee ancestry, and stated that Wurth had fabricated an American Indian identity for "personal gain". TAAF's report stated that Wurth's family were white settlers, rather than Native Americans. In response, Wurth's literary agent alleged that TAAF employs "tools of manipulation and unwarranted persecution of Native Americans." Tyler Blue Tarpalechee, a Muscogee (Note: Tarpalechee writes that he chooses to identify as Muscogee rather than Mvskoke in his thesis, due to familial affiliations.) colleague of Wurth's, wrote that if Wurth was committing Indigenous identity fraud, it would harm his work, as he had cited her in his writing.

Wurth later said that she is unenrolled in any Native nation due to "record-keeping practices in Texas in the 1800s," and speculated that the TAAF investigation had been motivated by her "advocacy for women and victims of harassment and abuse, as well as [my] work to expose predators in the Native American writing world."

=== Qwo-Li Driskill ===
In November 2023, TAAF published findings alleging that Qwo-Li Driskill, an associate professor at Oregon State University, had falsely claimed to be of Osage, Lenape, Lumbee, and Cherokee heritage. Driskill claimed to be a non-enrolled descendant of Native Americans, but TAAF's report concluded that Driskill had no Native ancestry. TAAF requested that OSU fire Driskill unless Driskill publicly apologized. Graduate students drafted a letter to the leadership of OSU outlining their grievances against Driskill. As of September 2024, Driskill was no longer employed at OSU.

In 2026, an OSU panel concluded that Driskill had engaged in research misconduct regarding their claim to Cherokee heritage. OSU stated they were reaching out to former students and tribal representatives to address harm caused by the misconduct.

=== Thomas King ===
In October 2025, TAAF contacted Thomas King, an American-born Canadian academic and author known for the book The Inconvenient Indian, to tell him that their research found no evidence that he was Cherokee. The next month, King published an op-ed saying that he had sincerely, albeit incorrectly, believed he was Cherokee. He agreed to return a 2003 National Aboriginal Achievement Award, but intended to keep the awards and commendations which were based not on his identity but on his research and writing. TAAF was angry that King published this news independently, rather than publishing a joint statement that they had written.

== Reception ==
TAAF's methods and investigations have been criticized by individuals targeted by the organization. Other targeted people pushed back against the organization's demands and self-appointed authority; for example, after TAAF investigated Canadian author Thomas King, he publicly rejected the organization's suggestion that he offer "an apology for my life," stating that he sincerely believed his ancestry and that TAAF's demand was inappropriate.

== See also ==
- Ghost Warrior Society
- List of organizations that self-identify as FNIM governments
- List of organizations that self-identify as Native American tribes
- Indigenous identity fraud in Canada and the United States
- Native American identity in the United States
