= AAFN =

AAFN may refer to:

- Ardoch Algonquin First Nation, Algonquin community north of Kingston, Ontario
- "Association of Alumni and Friends of NACURH"; see National Association of College and University Residence Halls#The Advancement Society
