= Zec Lesueur =

- Location within Quebec
- Location: Canada, Quebec, Antoine-Labelle Regional County Municipality
- Nearest city: Lac-Douaire (unorganized territory)
- Coordinates: 47°14′N 75°25′W
- Area: 776.50 square kilometres (299.81 sq mi)
- Established: 1978
- Governing body: Association de chasse et pêche Le Sueur inc.

The ZEC Lesueur is a "zone d'exploitation contrôlée" (controlled harvesting zone) (ZEC) in the unorganized territory of Lac Douaire, in Antoine-Labelle Regional County Municipality, in the administrative region of Laurentides, in Quebec, in Canada.

== Geography ==
The territory of the Zec Lesueur is bounded on:

- West by the Gatineau River (from the Doyon Bay, located in the northern part of Baskatong Reservoir) and Zec Petawaga
- East and south by the Zec Mitchinamecus
- North by the Bazin River
- South by the Notawassi River and Notawassi lake (except a bunch of terran about 1 km wide).

The three highest peaks of the ZEC are located near the edge of the Zec Mitchinamecus: montagne de la Tour (mountain of the tour), montagne du Petit Duplessis (Little Mountain Duplessis) (419 m.), la montagne du Chaise (Mount Chair) (444 m.) et la montagne Perdue (449 m.).

On the western edge of the ZEC, the Gatineau River has several rapids: Esturgeon, Ceizur, "chutes du Serpent" (Falls of snake), rapides de la Trinité, Chantants (Singing), Pikes et Mocassins (at the mouth of the river Bazin).

Journey to access to entrance station:

- Lamerlière (main station): Take the route 117 to Mont-Laurier. Take Highway 309 north to Ferme-Neuve. And take forest Road 17 up to the ZEC. The second option of route from Sainte-Anne-du-Lac: take route 309 north, then use the forest road no. 2 up to the "Lac des Polonais" (lake of Poles).
- Silver Lake (substation) at Km 11 of 11th via Sainte-Anne-du-Lac.

== Hunting and Fishing ==
On the territory of the ZEC, hunting is limited enrollment periods according to the types of hunting gear, sex beasts, for the following species: moose, american black bear, grouse and hare.

Fishing has quota for brook trout, lake trout, pike, walleye and bass.

== Toponymy ==
The name of the ZEC is directly related to lake Lesueur, located in the northern part of zec. The lake is located at 5.3 km east of the Gatineau River, and is linked to a chain of lakes linked together by the Lesueur River (in the north-east to south-west) including lakes (starting from the most northerly): Carrière (Career), Pot (Jar), Dumain, "de la Vache" (Cow), Orphan, Lesueur, La Saussaye, Ouzel et Menneval. From the latter lake, Lesueur River flows west for 4 km to empty into the Gatineau River.

The name "Zec Lesueur" was formalized August 5, 1982 at the Bank of place names of the Commission de toponymie du Québec (Geographical Names Board of Quebec).

== Attachments ==
=== Related articles ===
- Lac-Douaire, unorganized territory
- Antoine-Labelle Regional County Municipality, (MRC)
- Laurentides, administrative region of Quebec
- Gatineau River
- Baskatong Reservoir
- ZEC Petawaga
- ZEC Mitchinamecus
- Zone d'exploitation contrôlée (Controlled harvesting zone) (ZEC)

=== External links ===
- Official website of ZEC Lesueur
