= Obsidian (disambiguation) =

Obsidian is a type of volcanic glass.

Obsidian may also refer to:

== Places ==
- Obsidian, Idaho, a town in Custer County, Idaho
- Obsidian Ridge, a mountain ridge in British Columbia, Canada

== Arts, entertainment, and media ==
=== Fictional entities ===
- Obsidian (character), a DC Comics character
- Obsidian (Transformers), a Transformers character
- Obsidian, a character in the animated TV series Trollz
- Obsidian, a character in the Cartoon Network series Steven Universe
- Obsidian, a synonym for dragonglass, which kills White Walkers and their soldiers in Game of Thrones
- Obsidian Order, a Cardassian intelligence agency from Star Trek

=== Gaming ===
- Obsidian (1986 video game), a video game written for the Amstrad CPC
- Obsidian (1997 video game), an adventure game developed by Rocket Science Games
- Obsidian Entertainment, a video game developer
- Obsidian, an item in the sandbox video game Minecraft

=== Literature ===
- Obsidian (novel), a 2020 novel by Thomas King
- Obsidian: Literature and Arts in the African Diaspora, an African-American peer-reviewed journal first published in 1975

=== Music ===
- Obsidian (Baths album), 2013
- Obsidian (Northlane album), 2022
- Obsidian (Paradise Lost album), 2020
- Obsidian (Naomi Sharon album), 2023
- "Obsidian", a song by Banco de Gaia from Igizeh, 2000
- "Obsidian", a song by Deadmau5 from Stuff I Used to Do, 2017
- "Obsidian", a song by Meshuggah from Nothing, 2002

=== Television episodes ===
- "Obsidian" (Adventure Time: Distant Lands), 2020
- "Obsidian" (The Copenhagen Test), 2025

== Computing ==
- Obsidian (software), a note-taking application
