= Tara Beagan =

Canadian playwright

- Citizenship: Canadian
- Occupations: Playwright, actress

Tara Beagan (born December 20, 1975) is a Nlakaʼpamux playwright and actress from Calgary, Alberta, Canada, most noted as the winner of the Siminovitch Prize in Theatre in 2020.

She won the Dora Mavor Moore Award for Outstanding New Play, Independent Theatre in 2005 for Thy Neighbour's Wife, for which she was also a nominee for Outstanding Performance by a Female, Independent Theatre. In 2006, she acted in Dead Dog in the City, Thomas King's revival of his earlier radio comedy series The Dead Dog Café Comedy Hour.

In 2009, she received a Dora nomination for Outstanding New Play, Independent Theatre for Miss Julie: Sheh'mah. In 2010, she premiered The Woods, a historical play set in 1640 which was part of The Mill series with plays by Damien Atkins, Hannah Moscovitch, and Matthew MacFadzean.

From 2011 to 2013, she served as artistic director of Native Earth Performing Arts. She subsequently founded the theatre company Article 11 with Andy Moro.

Her plays have included Jesus Chrysler, Free As Injuns, Reckoning, Dreary and Izzy, Honour Beat, Deer Woman, and The Ministry of Grace.

She won the Governor General's Award for English-language drama at the 2025 Governor General's Awards for Rise, Red River. She was also nominated in the same year for The Ministry of Grace, one of the first times in the entire history of the award that a writer received two separate nominations for different plays in the same year, rather than a single joint nomination for a multi-play anthology volume.

== Personal life ==
Beagan is of mixed Canadian Irish (father) and Nlaka'pamux (mother) descent.
