= Terril Calder =

Canadian artist and animator

- Born: Fort Frances, Ontario, Canada
- Occupation(s): Artist, Animator
- Website: www.terrilcalder.com/home.html

Terril Calder is a Canadian artist and animator. She is most noted for her short film Snip, which was named to the Toronto International Film Festival's annual year-end Canada's Top Ten list in 2016.

== Life and education ==
Calder was born in Fort Frances, Ontario. She attended the University of Manitoba's Fine Art program where she studied drawing and film.

== Career ==
Calder, a Métis from Fort Frances, Ontario, released her first short film Canned Meat in 2009. In 2011 she was the animator on Michelle Latimer's short film Choke, which was a Genie Award nominee for Best Animated Short Film at the 32nd Genie Awards in 2012, and on her own short film The Gift, which won the Kent Monkman Award for Best Experimental/Innovation in Storytelling at the 2011 imagineNATIVE Film and Media Arts Festival.

In 2014 she released The Lodge, her first full-length feature film.

Calder was given the 2016 K.M. Hunter award by the Ontario Arts Council for her work in Media Arts.

Meneath: The Hidden Island of Ethics was released in 2021.
