= Ardoch Algonquin First Nation =

Algonquin community in North America

Ardoch Algonquin is a non-status Algonquin (Anishinaabe) community that is located around the Madawaska, Mississippi and Rideau watersheds, north of Kingston, Ontario.

As non-status Indians (not recognized as an Indian Band by the federal Indian Act or any provincial government) Ardoch members are sometimes involved in intra-community politics.

== History ==
In 1844, land was reserved for their use at Bobs Lake, but it was destroyed by illegal logging and later subject to settlement.

In the 1930s, the Government of Canada set up a reserve at Golden Lake and gave status to those living there (Algonquins of Pikwàkanagàn First Nation). Ardoch Algonquins were encouraged to abandon their lands, and move to Golden Lake.

In the summer of 1981, the Ardoch Algonquin blockaded a commercial rice-harvesting venture to protect what they saw as their territory and their manoomin (wild rice) which grows in the Mississippi river nearby. At the end of August, the community was raided by the police, and many protesters were arrested. Although the blockade ended, the rice-harvesting venture stopped, and no further attempts to claim it have been made.

More recently, Ardoch Algonquin and Shabot Obaadjiwan blocked access to a prospective uranium mining site, near Sharbot Lake, Ontario, on traditional Ardoch territory. Frontenac Ventures Corporation, the company which wishes to do uranium drilling tests, sought injunctions against the leaders of the protest. A Supreme Court of Canada ruling insists that provincial governments are legally obliged to consult with First Nations communities prior to any economic activity on land they have claimed, the Ontario Provincial Government began negotiations with Frontenac Ventures.

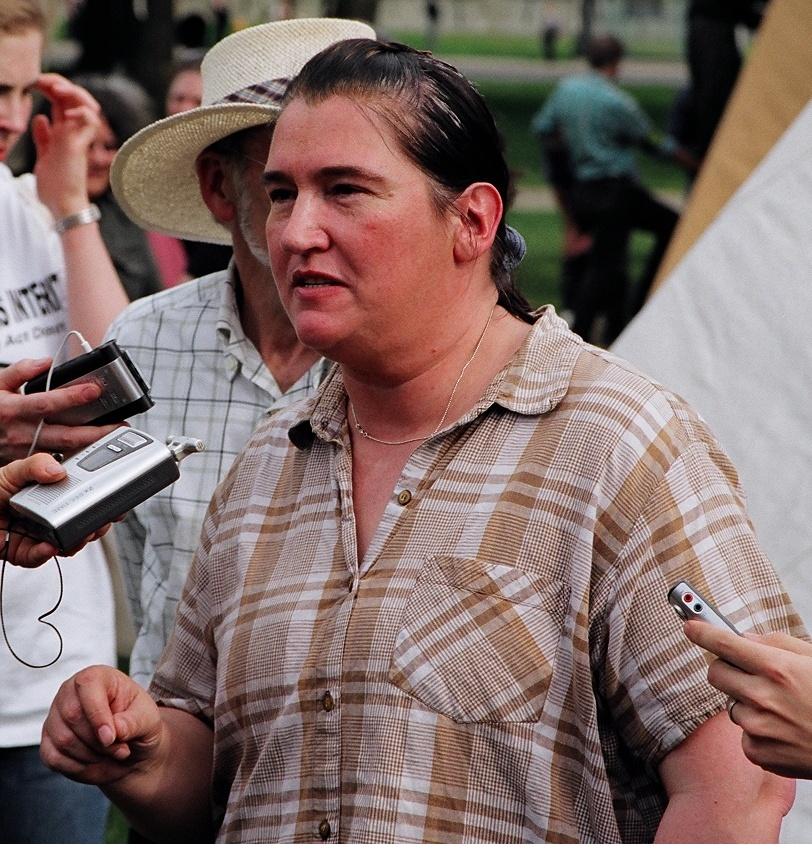
Chief Paula Sherman

In February, 2008, Justice Douglas Cunningham sentenced Ardoch Algonquin co-chiefs Paula Sherman and Robert Lovelace to six month terms in prison for contempt of court, but Sherman, a single mother of three, agreed to obey the injunctions to avoid prison time. Lovelace, a non-indigenous person who immigrated to Canada in the 1960s, is father of seven, and an instructor at Queen's University and Sir Sandford Fleming Community College. The court also fined him $25,000 and fined the community an additional $10,000. Sherman, a professor at Trent University was fined $15 000, payable to Frontenac Ventures. Currently the injunction restricts the Algonquin and non-native activists from approaching the site closer than 200 metres; this has not, however, discouraged protests in surrounding communities. In June, 2008 the Ontario Court of Appeal overturned Justice Cunningham's decision and ordered Lovelace immediately released. The Court of Appeal noted that the conflict between the Ardoch people and Frontenac Ventures could have been avoided if the Government of Ontario had consulted with them before approving uranium exploration in the area.

On March 18, 2008 Shabot Obaadjiwan Chief Doreen Davis and Elder Earl Bedore were required to enter into an undertaking "to discourage other members of their community and other organizations from interfering" with Frontenac Ventures' operations.

In addition to the charges of contempt, Frontenac Ventures is suing the Ardoch Algoquin First Nation for $77 million.

On March 18, 2008, contempt charges were dropped "without costs" against three non-native activists: Frank Morrison and Christian Peacemakers David Milne and Reverend John Hudson. They had been charged with violating the same injunction as Lovelace and Sherman, but the Ontario Crown declined to prosecute. During the same proceedings, however, warrants were obtained for the arrest of five other non-native activists who allegedly violated the injunction.

In early 2011, Robert Lovelace was involved in a number of protests against the development of Kanata's South March Highlands, including Beaver Pond Forest, on the western edge of Ottawa.

== See also ==
- List of organizations that self-identify as FNIM governments
