= The Dead Dog Café Comedy Hour =

Canadian radio comedy show

The Dead Dog Café Comedy Hour was a radio comedy show on CBC Radio One for four seasons, running from 1997 to 2000.

== Premise ==
The show was set in a fictional café of the same name, in the equally fictional town of Blossom, Alberta. Both Blossom and the café were originally described in Thomas King's award-winning novel Green Grass, Running Water, though it was run by different characters. The show borrowed numerous elements from King's novel.

== Cast ==
The show featured King (playing himself), Floyd Favel Starr playing Jasper Friendly Bear and Edna Rain playing Gracie Heavy Hand. All the main characters were Indigenous Canadians, although in the show they call themselves and other First Nations peoples 'Indians'. The humor is wry and sarcastic, often dark and subtle, "Good morning Gracie". The show was a mix of scathing political critique, social commentary, mock cultural stereotyping—mostly white, or white perceptions of native peoples, and irreverent comedy.

== Format ==
Despite the name, the show was 15 minutes long. It typically ran as a segment on CBC Radio One's This Morning. It featured a mix of prerecorded and live sound effects. The show had a number of regular segments, including:

- Gracie's Authentic Traditional Aboriginal Recipes, including puppy stew, fried bologna, and Kraft Dinners
- The Authentic Indian Name generator, featuring three wheels that could automatically create names like "Stewart Coffee Armadillo" or "Rosemarie Clever Tuna"
- Friendly Bear's Blackout Bingo, where listeners were asked to play bingo at home using a card they made up
- Gracie's Conversational Cree, which taught simple but useful phrases, such as, "Please ask the chauffeur to bring the car around" and "How long will we be in port?"
- Recommendations from the Royal Commission on Aboriginal Peoples were ironically highlighted.
- A recurring sign-off at the conclusion of each episode, "Stay calm. Be brave. Wait for the signs."

It also regularly featured short guest spots in the "What Else Do You Do (When You're Not Being Famous)?" segment, which featured interviews with famous Indigenous people such as Tomson Highway, Laura Vinson, Graham Greene and an actor playing Louis Riel.

== Production ==
Dead Dog Café was featured by the Globe Theatre as a live production from May 15 to May 16, 2001, which was broadcast on May 21 on This Morning.

The Dead Dog Café Comedy Hour returned for a one-off hour-long show in 2002, recorded live at Regina's Globe Theatre.

The original Dead Dog cast briefly returned on Dead Dog in the City which aired weekly on Sounds Like Canada with repeats on Nighttime Review from April 6, 2006, to December 20 that year. Twenty-six new episodes were planned and aired again over the summer of 2006. This new iteration also starred Tara Beagan as Portia Jumpingbull.

== Discography ==
- Dead Dog Café Comedy Hour, Vol. 1 (1998)
- Dead Dog Café Comedy Hour, Vol. 2 (1999)
- Dead Dog Café Comedy Hour, Vol. 3 (2000)
- Dead Dog Café Comedy Hour, Vol. 4 (2001)
