= Marilyn Dumont =

Canadian poet of Cree/Métis descent

- Born: 1955 (age 70–71); Olds, Alberta
- Occupations: poet, professor

Marilyn Dumont (born 1955, Olds, Alberta) is a Canadian poet and educator of Cree / Métis descent.

Born in northeastern Alberta, she is a descendant of Gabriel Dumont. Dumont holds an MFA from the University of British Columbia. Her work is widely anthologized. She is currently a Full Professor at the University of Alberta cross appointed in the Faculties of Arts and Native Studies. In the Faculty of Arts - English & Film Studies Department she teaches Indigenous Literature and creative writing.

== Bibliography ==
- A Really Good Brown Girl. London, ON: Brick, 1996. ISBN 0-919626-76-9
- Green Girl Dreams Mountains. Lantzville, BC: Oolichan Books, 2001.
- that tongued belonging. Cape Croker ON: Kegedonce Press, 2007
  - in German: diese Zugehörigkeit durch die Zunge, in: Heute sind wir hier. We Are Here Today. A Bilingual Collection of Contemporary Aboriginal Literature(s) from Canada. ed. Hartmut Lutz. Publisher: M.u.H. von der Linden, Wesel 2009 ISBN 3926308125
- Ed. Initiations: a Selection of Young Native Writings. Penticton: Theytus Books, 2007.

== Awards ==
- 1997: Gerald Lampert Award, A Really Good Brown Girl
- 2001: Alberta Book Award for Poetry, Green Girl Dreams Mountains
- 2001: Writer's Guild of Alberta Stephan G. Stephansson Award for Poetry, Green Girl Dreams Mountains
- 2007: McNally Robinson Aboriginal Book of the Year Award, That Tongued Belonging
- 2019: Alberta Lieutenant Governor’s Distinguished Artist Award

== Notable criticism ==
- Barkwell, Lawrence J.: Marilyn Dumont, in Women of the Métis Nation. Winnipeg: Louis Riel Institute, 2010. ISBN 978-0-9809912-5-3
- Patrick Schmitz: The aspect of healing in the poetry of Gregory Scofield, Marilyn Dumont, Roo Borson and Louise Bernice Halfe. Grin, Munich 2012 ISBN 9783656151364
- Vesna Lopičić: The devil’s language of Marilyn Dumont. doi:10.1007/s11059-017-0375-z. In: Neohelicon, Springer (Netherlands) March 2017, pp 1–12, print: ISSN 0324-4652
