= Choke (2011 film) =

- Directed by: Michelle Latimer
- Written by: Michelle Latimer
- Produced by: Michelle Latimer
- Edited by: Cam McLauchlin
- Animation by: Terril Calder
- Production company: A71 Productions
- Release date: January 23, 2011 (Sundance)
- Running time: 6 minutes
- Country: Canada
- Language: English

Choke is a Canadian animated short film, directed by Michelle Latimer and released in 2011. Created by Latimer in conjunction with animator Terril Calder, the film centres on a young First Nations man who leaves his remote northern reserve to move to the city, only to find life there much more difficult and challenging than he had imagined.

The film premiered at the 2011 Sundance Film Festival, where it received an honorable mention in the short films category.

It was named to the Toronto International Film Festival's year-end Canada's Top Ten list for 2011, and subsequently received a Genie Award nomination for Best Animated Short Film at the 32nd Genie Awards in 2012.
