= Shabot Obaadjiwan First Nation =

Coordinates: 44°43′24.4″N 76°56′49.1″W

The Shabot Obaadjiwan First Nation, formerly known as the Sharbot Mishigama Anishinabe Algonquin First Nation and as the Sharbot Lake Algonquin First Nation, is a non-status Algonquin (Anishinaabe) community located north of Kingston, Ontario. Its chief is Doreen Davis.

In 2007 and 2008, the Shabot Obaadjiwan First Nation worked closely with the Ardoch Algonquin First Nation to oppose uranium exploration in the Sharbot Lake area. Both communities took part in a non-violent blockade of a proposed mining site, and were involved in legal action against the prospecting company Frontenac Ventures.

== See also ==
- List of organizations that self-identify as FNIM governments
