= Chakastaypasin First Nation =

Partially recognized Cree First Nation in Saskatchewan, Canada

- Band No. 98
- People: Cree
- Treaty: Treaty 6
- Headquarters: James Smith Cree Nation
- Province: Saskatchewan

Land
- Other reserve: Chakastaypasin 98

Population (2021)
- On reserve: 0
- Total population: Disputed

Government
- Chief: Calvin Sanderson

Website
- jamessmithcreenation.com

The Chakastaypasin First Nation (also spelled Chakastapaysin, Chacastapasen) is a partially recognized First Nations band government in central Saskatchewan, Canada.

== History ==
=== Termination ===
In 1876, Chief Chakastaypasin and four headmen signed Treaty 6 at Fort Carlton, formally ceding their Indigenous title to the British Crown. In the late 1880s, the band was resident in the Fort de la Corne area.

In 1898, the Department of Indian Affairs alleged that all of Chakastaypasin's band was absent from their Indian reserve, and its membership had been completely transferred into other bands. This assertion meant that Chakastaypasin had legally ceased to exist, and the federal government sold the Chakastaypasin reserve to white landowners.

=== Claim ===
Chakastaypasin descendants, incorporated into the nearby James Smith Cree Nation, remained active and aware of their history. In 1998, these members launched a claim against the Government of Canada, asserting that the Chakastaypasin surrender and sale was unlawful. In May 1999, the Indian Claims Commission conducted an inquiry, which the Government of Canada has not challenged.

In the year 2000, the full membership of the James Smith Cree Nation conducted a vote to resurrect Chakastaypasin and the Peter Chapman First Nation. The vote passed, and James Smith now officially recognizes the 1898 amalgamation as invalid. Today, Chakastaypasin descendants elect their own Chief and Council, although they are not recognized by the federal government.

== See also ==
- List of organizations that self-identify as FNIM governments
