= Stoney Knoll First Nation =

First Nations band in Saskatchewan, Canada

- Band No. 107
- Young Chippewayan First Nation
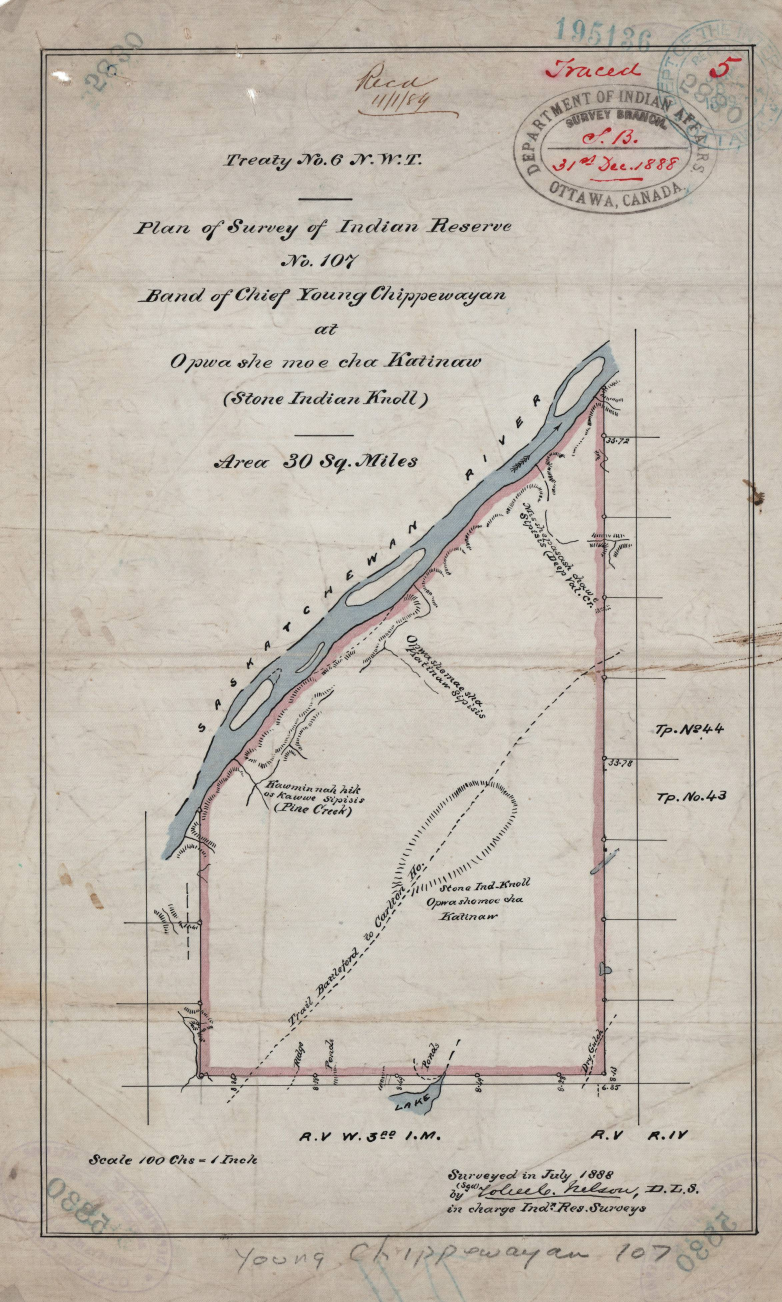
- Map of the Stoney Knoll reserve
- People: Cree
- Treaty: Treaty 6
- Headquarters: Gallivan
- Province: Saskatchewan

Land
- Other reserve: Stoney Knoll 107

Population (2021)
- On reserve: 0
- Total population: Disputed

Government
- Chief: Sylvia Weenie

Tribal Council
- Battlefords Agency Tribal Chiefs

Website
- batc.ca

The Stoney Knoll First Nation (Young Chippewayan First Nation, also spelled Chipeewayan) is an unrecognized First Nation band government in central Saskatchewan, Canada.

== History ==
=== Termination ===
In 1876, Chief Chippewayan and four headmen signed Treaty 6 at Fort Carlton, "formally ceding their Indigenous title" to the British Crown. Chippewayan died the next year, and was succeeded by his son, Young Chippewayan. The Department of Indian Affairs surveyed a 30 square mile reserve for the new "Young Chippewayan Band" in 1879. This reserve was seldom occupied, as the dwindling bison population meant that bands of this era had to range widely to sustain themselves.

After the North-West Rebellion of 1885, the federal government withheld treaty payments from Young Chippewayan, considering the band to have participated in insurrection. This caused a rapid attrition of membership, and Chief Young Chippewayan himself was transferred into the Thunderchild First Nation. By 1889, every Young Chippewayan member had either died, vanished, or been transferred into a different band.

In 1897, Indian Affairs disposed of the Stoney Knoll reserve, and its land was distributed to Mennonite and Lutheran settlers, who remained unaware of its previous history.

While lacking federal recognition, Stoney Knoll is recognized by its peers in the Battlefords Agency Tribal Chiefs, of which it is a member.

=== Claim ===
Despite being federally unrecognized, the band maintained genealogical records and a hereditary leadership. Chief Alfred Snake requested a specific claim in 1982, which was denied.

In 1993, the Indian Claims Commission opened a file to investigate Stoney Knoll's claim. In a 58-page opinion, written in part by Jim Prentice, the Commission ruled that the band's claim was legitimate. However, because the band's genealogy had not been professionally maintained, its membership list was considered invalid. Pending further research, the band remains federally unrecognized today.

In 2006, the first Stoney Knoll Gathering was held on the former reserve site. Local Mennonites and Lutherans joined Stoney Knoll members to support the band's efforts to obtain recognition from the federal government. Mennonite Central Committee and St John's Lutheran Church (Laird, Saskatchewan) continue to support the Stoney Knoll First Nation's claim, and produced a documentary film to raise awareness of the issue, "Reserve 107: Reconciliation on the Prairies".

In September 2016, they became a signatory of the Buffalo Treaty.

== See also ==
- List of organizations that self-identify as FNIM governments
