= Alias (2013 film) =

- Directed by: Michelle Latimer
- Written by: Michelle Latimer
- Produced by: Michelle Latimer; Nida Marji
- Starring: Alkatraz
- Cinematography: Chris Romeike
- Edited by: Kye Meechan
- Music by: Vikas Kohli
- Release date: April 2013 (Canada)
- Running time: 65 minutes
- Country: Canada
- Language: English

Alias is a 2013 Canadian documentary film directed by Michelle Latimer, in her feature film directorial debut.

== Premise ==
The film "follows aspiring rappers trying to escape the gangster life." The Hot Docs Film Festival synopsis reads: "Michelle Latimer makes her feature doc debut with a powerfully cinematic, observational doc that captures the realities of five Toronto rappers trying to escape the hustle of drugs and danger through their music."

== Reception ==
The film received positive reviews, was nominated for several awards, including for a Canadian Screen Award, and screened at numerous festivals, notably the Hot Docs Film Festival.
