= McNally Robinson Aboriginal Book of the Year Award =

The McNally Robinson Aboriginal Book of the Year Award is a Canadian literary award, presented annually since 2005 to a First Nations, Inuit or Métis writer for a work published in English in any literary genre. The author receives a cash award of $5,000, donated by the Canadian bookstore chain McNally Robinson.

== Winners ==
- 2005 - Joseph Boyden, Three Day Road
- 2006 - Thomas King, A Short History of Indians in Canada
- 2007 - Marilyn Dumont, That Tongued Belonging
