= Medicine River =

1989 novel by Thomas King

- First edition
- Author: Thomas King
- Language: English
- Genre: Novel
- Publisher: Viking Canada
- Publication date: 1989
- Publication place: Canada
- Media type: Print (Paperback)
- Pages: 250

Medicine River is a novel written by author Thomas King. It was first published by Viking Canada in 1989. The book was later adapted (1993) into a television movie starring Graham Greene and Tom Jackson.

== Plot summary ==
Medicine River chronicles the lives of a group of contemporary First Nations in Western Canada. The novel is divided into eighteen short chapters. The story is recounted by the protagonist, Will, in an amiable, conversational fashion, with frequent flashbacks to earlier portions of his life.

In the novel, Medicine River, Thomas King creates a story of a little community to reflect the whole native nation. A simple return of Will's makes the little town seem to be more colourful. "Medicine River makes non-native readers think a little longer and harder about the lives of the first people they live among and the places they inhabit." Although Will enters the town as a foreigner, he eventually becomes part of the community. Medicine River shows the history of Canada and teaches readers to learn from the past experience in order to become better people.

Will meets Louise who becomes an unfulfilled love interest that very much represents Will's existence, a series of half-fulfilled expectations. That is, he develops an ongoing relationship with Louise and her daughter, South Wing, for whom Will becomes a kind of father-figure.

It has been included on the high school reading curriculum in many Canadian jurisdictions. One advisor writes, "It is a humorously told 'homecoming novel' that echoes an oral storytelling style, yet at the same time, debunks any kind of stereotypical 'cultural voice.' Although the protagonist is a middle-aged man, the novel is appropriate for young people, simply because of the way it is written, drawing in any audience."

== Movie ==
The television movie was filmed in Alberta. Actors Graham Greene and Tom Jackson also starred in 1993 television film "Spirit Rider" which was filmed in Winnipeg, Manitoba.

== Critical studies ==
1. The Aesthetic of Talk in Thomas King's Medicine River By: Robinson, Jack; Studies in Canadian Literature/Etudes en Littérature Canadienne, 2006; 31 (1): 75–94.
2. There Is No Bentham Street in Calgary: Panoptic Discourses and Thomas King's Medicine River By: Stratton, Florence; Canadian Literature, 2005 Summer; 185: 11–27.
3. 'Stay Calm, Be Brave, Wait for the Signs': Sign-Offs and Send-Ups in the Fiction of Thomas King By: Hirsch, Bud; Western American Literature, 2004 Summer; 39 (2): 145–75.
4. Steinbeck's Influence upon Native American Writers By: Hadella, Paul. IN: Shillinglaw and Hearle, Beyond Boundaries: Rereading John Steinbeck. Tuscaloosa, AL: U of Alabama P; 2002. pp. 87–97
5. Purana Narratology and Thomas King: Rewriting of Colonial History in The Medicine River and Joe the Painter and the Deer Island Massacre By: Vahia, Aditi H.; Canadian Journal of Native Studies, 2002; 22 (1): 65–80.
6. The Art That Will Not Die: The Story-Telling of Greg Sarris and Thomas King By: Mackie, Mary Margaret; Dissertation, U of Oklahoma, 2001.
7. Time Out: (Slam)Dunking Photographic Realism in Thomas King's Medicine River By: Christie, Stuart; Studies in American Indian Literatures, 1999 Summer; 11 (2): 51–65.
8. Beyond the Frame: Tom King's Narratives of Resistment By: Peters, Darrell Jesse; Studies in American Indian Literatures: The Journal of the Association for the Study of American Indian Literatures, 1999 Summer; 11 (2): 66–79.
9. Thomas King: A Trickster Healing through Humour By: Pascual Soler, Nieves. IN: Alvarez Maurín, Broncano Rodrígues, Fernández Rabadán, and Garrigós González, Actas III Congreso de la Sociedad Española para el Estudio dos Estados Unidos/Spanish Association for American Studies (SAAS): Fin de Siglo: Crisis y nuevos principios/Century Ends, Crises and New Beginnings. León, Spain: Universidad de León; 1999. pp. 299–305
10. Status, Mixedbloods, and Community in Thomas King's Medicine River By: Mackie, Mary M.; Journal of American Studies of Turkey, 1998 Fall; 8: 65–71.
11. Coyote Agape: Thomas King's Working for Love By: La Bossiere, Camille R.; River Review/La Revue Rivière: A Multidisciplinary Journal of Arts and Ideas/Revue Multidisciplinaire d'Arts et d'Idées, 1995; 1: 47–57.
12. 'Tell Our Own Stories': Politics and the Fiction of Thomas King By: Walton, Percy; World Literature Written in English, 1990 Autumn; 30 (2): 77–84.
13. Lavalley, Giselle Rene (1996). "One Tricky Coyote": The fiction of Thomas King (M.A. thesis). Wilfrid Laurier University.
