= Ghost Warrior Society =

Canadian nonprofit organization

- Founded: 2022
- Headquarters: Canada
- Leader: Crystal Semaganis
- Website: www.ghostwarriorsociety.com

The Ghost Warrior Society is an organization that investigates suspected cases of Indigenous identity fraud in Canada.

== About ==
Founded in 2022, the Ghost Warrior Society investigates suspected cases of Indigenous identity fraud related to First Nations, Métis, and Inuit claims. The leader of the organization is Crystal Semaganis.

The Society has gained attention for publicly raising allegations of suspected Indigenous identity fraud against individuals. Semaganis claims they have been threatened with lawsuits over their reporting.

On January 23, 2025, the Art Gallery of Hamilton hosted an event on "Pretendians or Indigenous Fraudsters" attended by Semaganis. In March 2025, Semaganis and other activists planned an event on "Organizational Strategies to Combat Pretendianism" at the Art Gallery of Hamilton. The event was temporarily suspended following controversy.

In May 2025, an academic from Cambrian College went on leave after pretendian claims were brought against them by the society causing the university to investigate.

In July 2025 a lawsuit was filed against Semaganis for engaging in a "relentless libelous campaign against the plaintiffs" resulting in "significant harms to personal and professional reputations, serious psychological harms, loss of income, loss of academic opportunities and loss of business opportunities".

== See also ==
- Indigenous identity fraud
- List of organizations that self-identify as FNIM governments
- Pretendian
- Tribal Alliance Against Frauds
