= Indians on Vacation =

2020 novel by Thomas King

- Author: Thomas King
- Audio read by: Keith Sellon-Wright
- Language: English
- Genre: Literary fiction
- Publisher: HarperCollins
- Publication date: 25 August 2020
- Publication place: Canada
- Media type: Print (hardcover), audiobook
- ISBN: 9781443460545

Indians on Vacation is a novel by Canadian writer Thomas King, published in 2020 by HarperCollins. The novel focuses on Bird and Mimi, a First Nations couple who are travelling in Europe following the discovery of a trove of old postcards from Mimi's late uncle Leroy, who absconded with a valuable family heirloom 100 years earlier but never returned.

The novel won the 2021 Stephen Leacock Memorial Medal for Humour. It was longlisted for the 2020 Giller Prize and shortlisted for the Governor General's Award for English-language fiction at the 2020 Governor General's Awards.

== Awards ==
Year	Award	Category	Result	Ref.
2020	Atwood Gibson Writers' Trust Fiction Prize	—	Shortlisted	
2020	Giller Prize	—	Longlisted	
2020	Governor General's Awards	Fiction (English)	Finalist	
2021	Evergreen Award	—	Finalist	
2021	Stephen Leacock Memorial Medal for Humour	—	Won	
2022	International Dublin Literary Award	—	Longlisted	
