= A Short History of Indians in Canada =

Collection book of short stories by Thomas king

First edition

A Short History of Indians in Canada is a collection of short stories by Thomas King, published by HarperCollins in 2005. Although the majority of the stories deal with issues surrounding First Nations people, the topics and styles are quite diverse.

The book won the McNally Robinson Aboriginal Book of the Year Award in 2006.

The title story was adapted into an animated film in 2017.

== Stories ==
1. A Short History of Indians in Canada
2. Tidings of Comfort and Joy
3. The Dog I Wish I had, I Would Call It Helen
4. The Baby in the Airmail Box
5. Coyote and the Enemy Aliens
6. Haida Gwaii
7. Little Bombs
8. The Colour of Walls
9. Bad Men Who Love Jesus
10. The Closer You Get to Canada, the More Things Will Eat Your Horses
11. Noah's Ark
12. Where the Borg Are
13. States to Avoid
14. Fire and Rain
15. Rendezvous
16. Domestic Furies
17. The Garden Court Motor Motel
18. Not Counting the Indian, There Were Six
19. Another Great Moment in Canadian Indian History
