= Truth and Bright Water =

Novel by Thomas King set in the Canadian Prairies

- Cover of the 2001 paperback edition
- Author: Thomas King
- Cover artist: Charles Rue Woods (2001 paperback edition)
- Language: English
- Genre: Novel
- Publisher: HarperFlamingo Canada (hardcover), Atlantic Monthly Press (hardcover, 2000), Grove Press (paperback, 2001)
- Publication date: 1999 (first edition, Canada); November 2000 (U.S.-Edition)
- Publication place: Canada
- Media type: Print (hardcover, paperback)
- Pages: 266 pp (first edition, hardcover), 240 pp (hardcover edition), 272 pp (2001 paperback edition)
- ISBN: 0-00-225503-0 (hardcover edition), ISBN 0-87113-818-2 (American hardcover edition), ISBN 0-8021-3840-3 (paperback edition)
- OCLC: 45123519
- Dewey Decimal: 813/.54 21
- LC Class: PR9199.3.K4422 T78 1999

Truth and Bright Water is a bildungsroman by Thomas King set in the Canadian Prairies on the Canada–United States border. The novel embeds a number of magical features (such as the disappearing church) within painstakingly realist prose, showing its affiliation with Magic realism.

== Plot introduction ==
Truth, a small town in rural Montana, and Bright Water, a reserve across the Canadian–American border, are separated by the river. The first person narrator, a 15-year-old Native American (Blackfoot) youth, Tecumseh (named after the famous Shawnee leader), watches a strange woman jump off the cliff into the river that marks the border. His companions are Lum, his cousin, and Soldier, his boxer dog. The plot revolves around their interactions with each others, with their parents, and other people in Truth and Bright Water, which lead up to the great events, the Indian Days festival, and the (partial) resolution of the mystery around the strange woman.

== Plot summary ==
The novel begins with a prologue, which describes the setting, the physical landscape around the two towns, Truth on the American side and the reserve Bright Water on the Canadian. The two towns are separated by the Shield river, which also marks the national border, and ineffectually connected by an uncompleted bridge and a "ferry," an old iron bucket suspended over the river on a steel cable.

We first meet the three central characters, Tecumseh, his dog Soldier and his cousin Lum, on the riverside. Lum is training for the long-distance run to take place at the Indian Days festival, which he hopes to win. The two boys see a truck approach the coulee; a woman emerges from the vehicle, throws a suitcase into the river and jumps after it herself. However, when the boys and the dog run down to the river to see what happened to her, she has disappeared and Soldier just finds the small skull of a child long dead.

The story branches out from this point to touch the stories of other characters connected to Tecumseh, his mother, who yearns to leave Truth to move to a big city and become an actress. His aunt Cassie, his mother's older sister and sometime role-model, who left the reserve to travel the world, but who has a mysterious guilt in her past that seems to bring her back to her home.

One of the most central of these storylines involves Monroe Swimmer, who refers to himself as "famous Indian artist," and who, like Cassie, has returned to the reserve. Monroe, a specialist in restoring paintings, buys the abandoned Methodist missionary church building and proceeds to paint it "out of" the landscape. The narrator leaves no doubt that the church actually becomes invisible even to Monroe himself when he is finished. Tecumseh becomes his assistant in a number of artistic endeavors (such as setting up metal buffalo statues to lure back the real buffalos chased away—or actually exterminated—by the white settlers in the nineteenth century), and Monroe is the only one of the adults who actually takes him seriously. Monroe tells Tecumseh important things about himself, even if he does it so that Tecumseh can then compose songs about his, Monroe's, heroic deeds. Eventually, Tecumseh finds out from Monroe that he not only restored nineteenth-century landscape paintings when he worked for museums around the world, he had also painted Indians "back into" the paintings and taken Native remains collected in these museums to take back. Monroe claims he is "going to save the world" (131). Another "heroic deed" of Monroe is his grand giveaway festival, to which he invites the whole town and at which he gives away all his possessions (these gifts also have symbolic meaning, e.g. Cassie receives an Inuit sculpture of a woman with a child on her back, Tecumseh gets the piano). Finally, it turns out that Monroe, wearing his characteristic wig, was the mysterious "woman" on the river and the skull the boys found was one of the re-appropriated pieces of Native American history stolen from various Indian nations.

Another story-line takes up Elvin, Tecumseh's father, a carpenter and smuggler, who tries to get things done and to be a good father, but who continually falls short. Tecumseh's parents are separated, but the father makes a number of ineffectual attempts to lure Tecumseh's mother back into a relationship. A chair that one of the members of the Indian band ordered, but which Elvin never gets done, is a running joke and emblematic of Elvin's inability to finish what he sets out to do. It comes as a complete surprise to everyone, including the narrator, when he drives to the Indian Days festival in the Volkswagen Karmann Ghia, the car he had been promising to fix for Tecumseh's mother throughout the novel.

Lum is perhaps the most tragic character in the novel. His abusive father Franklin (Elvin's brother) told him his mother was dead, but Lum does not believe him and hopes she will come back. There is a moving scene in which he talks to the child's skull they found in the river imagining "he" is crying for his lost mother: "'Stupid baby' [...] 'She's not coming back!' [...] 'She's never coming back!" (177). Franklin injures Lum so severely one day that he is unable to participate in the race that he had been training so hard for. He is aggressive and unpredictable in his interactions with his younger cousin and gruff with Soldier, but the dog is undeterred and absolutely loyal to him. When Lum finally runs off the unfinished bridge into a certain death in the river, Soldier follows him blindly, after the two boys have performed Monroe's funeral rites for "their" skull and throw it in the river.

Many of the storylines remain open. There is no conclusive answer, for example, to Tecumseh's question "Who's Mia?" (55) even though Mia seems to be the key to Cassie's guilt and the reason why she came back. There is a track of clues that runs through the novel and ends at the point when Cassie burns the baby clothes from a suitcase Tecumseh's mother has given her. One of these clues is Cassie's tattoo which spells AIM (American Indian Movement), but in the mirror reads "Mia." Another clue is the strange fact that Cassie sends presents to Tecumseh, at a time that has nothing to do with his birthday, and which to him are "girls" toys, e.g. a doll and a pink box with a mirror (117). Another unsolved riddle is the identity of the woman Tecumseh and Lum observe in intimate interactions with Monroe in the church one day (both Cassie and Tecumseh's Mother had had a relationship with him in the past). In addition, Tecumseh once walks in on his mother and Cassie having a conversation whilst going through old baby clothes. Helen indicates that she had an affair fifteen years ago, at the time that Tecumseh would have been conceived (122). Also, Helen asks Cassie if she's going to "give it up?" (122), to which Cassie responds "Why not... Gave it up the first time" (122). Given the context, this conversation indicates that Cassie has returned because she is pregnant. Additionally, she had been pregnant before, and this child was given up. The name Mia is also related to her former pregnancy. Also, the novel ends with Tecumseh's mother carefully trimming a bouquet of purple freesias "until there is nothing left but the stems" (266), but the narrator never learns who gave them to her.

== Characters in Truth and Bright Water ==
Tecumseh, 15 years old; protagonist and first person narrator.

Lum, Tecumseh's cousin.

Helen, Tecumseh's mother; beautician with dreams of moving to a big city to become an actress; plays the role of the Queen in the political satire Snow White and the Seven Dwarfs put on by a community theater group.

Elvin, Tecumseh's father, carpenter.

Auntie Cassie, sister of Tecumseh's mother.

Tecumseh's grandmother, a wise old woman.

Monroe Swimmer, Indian artist who has made money and came back to the reservation to "save himself". He felt that he has not yet accomplished anything, but really he is the richest man in Truth & Bright Water.

Franklin, Lum's abusive father and Elvin's brother, a tribal leader.

Rebecca Neugin, an 8-year-old Cherokee girl from Georgia on her way to Oklahoma with her family; she's a ghost from the past, a historical character who died on the Cherokee Trail of Tears in the nineteenth century.

Mia, another ghostly character, whose identity is never clearly revealed; Tecumseh's mother, grandmother and aunt Cassie know who she is, but the narrator never finds out; there are strong indications (e.g. Cassie's tattoo AIM - MIA), that she is Cassie's lost or abandoned daughter.

Soldier, Tecumseh's curious dog, who although is a silent character in the novel he plays a large role in plot development.

== Major themes ==
- Cousins in literature
- Coming of age
- Dogs in literature
- U.S. - Canadian relations
- Crossing boundaries
- Appearance vs reality
- Disappearing and reappearing
- Repatriation of Indian culture
- Loss
- Separation
- Family
- Associational Literature
