= Meneath: The Hidden Island of Ethics =

2021 Canadian animated short film

- Film poster
- Directed by: Terril Calder
- Written by: Terril Calder; Darlene Naponse
- Produced by: Jelena Popovic
- Starring: Terril Calder; Lake Delisle; Kent McQuaid; Gail Maurice
- Edited by: Jeff Barnaby
- Animation by: Terril Calder; Zane Kozak
- Production company: National Film Board of Canada
- Release date: September 11, 2021 (TIFF)
- Running time: 20 minutes
- Country: Canada
- Languages: English, Anishinaabemowin

Meneath: The Hidden Island of Ethics is a Canadian animated short film, directed by Terril Calder and released in 2021. The film centres on a young Métis girl (Lake Delisle) who is torn between Jesus (Kent McQuaid) teaching her about the seven deadly sins, and Nokomis (Gail Maurice) telling her of the Seven Sacred Teachings. The film premiered at the 2021 Toronto International Film Festival, and was subsequently screened at the 2021 Vancouver International Film Festival.

The film was named to TIFF's annual year-end Canada's Top Ten list for 2021, and received a Canadian Screen Award nomination for Best Animated Short at the 10th Canadian Screen Awards in 2022.

== Reception ==
Since its release, the film has been selected in various festivals and academies around the world:

Year	Festivals	Award/Category	Status
2021	Ottawa International Animation Festival	Special Mention - Best Canadian Animation	Won
2022	Canadian Screen Awards	Best Animated Short	Nominated
