= Green Grass, Running Water =

1993 novel by Thomas King

- Paperback cover
- Author: Thomas King
- Language: English
- Genre: Indigenous, trickster novel
- Publisher: Houghton Mifflin – hardcover March 4, 1993. Bantam Books – paperback June 1, 1994.
- Publication date: March 4, 1993
- Publication place: Canada
- Media type: Print (hardback & paperback)
- Pages: 480 pp (U.S. Paperback)
- ISBN: 0-553-37368-4 (U.S. Paperback)
- OCLC: 29361347

Green Grass, Running Water is a 1993 novel by American-born Canadian author Thomas King. The novel is set in a contemporary First Nations Blackfoot community in Alberta, Canada. It gained attention due to its unique use of structure, narrative, and the fusion of oral and written literary traditions. The novel is rife with humor and satire, particularly regarding Judeo-Christian beliefs as well as Western government and society. Green Grass, Running Water was a finalist for the 1993 Governor General's Award in Fiction.

== Plot summary ==
Green Grass, Running Water opens with an unknown narrator explaining "the beginning", in which the trickster-god Coyote is present as well as the unknown narrator. Coyote has a dream which takes form and wakes Coyote up from his sleep. The dream thinks that it is very smart; indeed, the dream thinks that it is god, but Coyote is only amused, labelling the dream as Dog, who gets everything backwards. Dog asks why there is water everywhere, surrounding the unknown narrator, Coyote, and him. At this, the unknown narrator begins to explain the escape of four Native American elders from a mental institution who are named Lone Ranger, Ishmael, Robinson Crusoe, and Hawkeye. The elders are each connected with a female character from native tradition: First Woman and the Lone Ranger, Changing Woman and Ishmael, Thought Woman and Robinson Crusoe, and Old Woman and Hawkeye. The book then divides into four main sections: each of these sections is narrated by one of the four elders.

In addition to these four explaining the "ordinary" events, they each tell a creation story that accounts for why there is so much water. In each creation story, the four encounter a figure from the Bible of Judeo-Christian tradition, as well as the western literary figures from whom each derives his name.

The book has four major plot lines. One follows the escape and travels of the elders and Coyote, who are out to fix the world. Dr Joseph Hovaugh and Babo, his assistant, try to track down the elders. Dr. Hovaugh keeps track of every time the elders have gone missing; he attributes major events, such as the volcanic eruption of Mount St Helens, to their disappearances. The second plot line follows Lionel Red Dog, Charlie Looking Bear and Alberta. The third plot line follows Eli Stands Alone, Lionel's uncle, who lives in his mother's house in the spillway of the Balene Dam. The fourth plot line involves characters from Christian and Native American creation myths and traditions, as well as literary and historical figures including Ahdamn, First Woman, the Young Man Who Walks on Water, Robinson Crusoe, Nasty Bumppo and so on.

The climax of the novel approaches at the time of the traditional Blackfoot annual ceremony of the Sun Dance. Ultimately, the dam breaks due to an earthquake caused by Coyote's singing and dancing. A flood destroys Eli's house, but also returns the waterway to its natural course.

The novel concludes much as it began. The trickster-god Coyote and the unknown narrator are in an argument about what existed in the beginning. Coyote says nothing, but the unknown narrator says that there was water. Once again Coyote asks why there is water everywhere, and the unknown narrator says he will explain how it happened.

== Principal characters ==
Lionel Red Dog – An uninspired, ill-motivated electronics salesman, Lionel rivals Charlie for the affection of professor Alberta Frank. Lionel's parents and sister Latisha offer counsel through his various troubles.

Charlie Looking Bear – A lover of the character Alberta Frank, he is Lionel's cousin and a slick lawyer; he represents the company that is building the dam opposed by Eli. Charlie was hired because the company thought an Aboriginal lawyer might ease resentment from the populace. He used to be a TV salesman and in many ways represents what Lionel could become.

Alberta Frank – A professor and the lover of both Lionel and Charlie. She wants to have a child, but does not want a husband or marriage.

Eli Stands Alone – Lionel's uncle. A former professor, he opposes building a dam that upsets the natural course of a waterway. This natural course is important to Blackfoot tradition. Eli lives in a cabin near the dam. It would be ruined (and his life threatened) if the dam were to continue to be expanded and form a lake. Eli has filed lawsuits, and the company that Charlie represents has been stymied for 10 years.

Latisha – Lionel's sister. She owns the Dead Dog Café and pretends to sell dog meat, because tourists incorrectly believe dog meat is the authentic ethnic food of the Blackfoot Native Americans. In the novel, she offers good counsel to Lionel.

Dog, a.k.a. GOD – While Coyote was sleeping at the beginning of his novel, one of his dreams takes form and runs amok, waking Coyote up. The dream thinks it is very smart, and calls itself GOD. Coyote agrees that his dream is smart, but that it is only a facsimile of Coyote and that this dream has everything backwards; thereby he names it Dog.

Coyote – A trickster god who falls asleep and gives form to his dream, "Dog". He is on speaking terms with the four escaped American Indians, as well as the unknown narrator of the novel. He does not directly speak to the "ordinary" denizens of Blossom, although he does appear as an odd-looking dog that Lionel sees dancing.

The Old Indians – These four escaped Aboriginal people of indeterminate gender break out from a mental institution in Florida and make their way to Blossom. Each is responsible for telling a segment of the novel to the unknown narrator of the novel. They each tell a creation story as well, in which they are originally identified as First Woman, Changing Woman, Thought Woman, and Old Woman. They encounter both a Biblical character as well as a western literary figure, and they change their names to these literary figures: First Woman to Lone Ranger, Changing Woman to Ishmael, Thought Woman to Robinson Crusoe, and Old Woman to Hawkeye.

Dr. Joe Hovaugh – the doctor in charge of the mental hospital from which the four Aboriginal men escape. King portrays him as a confused, harmless, uninterested old man who is concerned mostly with his dying garden. When pronounced phonetically, his name sounds similar to "Jehovah". Hovaugh can also be associated with the Canadian literary critic Northrop Frye.

== Title significance ==
The title, Green Grass, Running Water, is said to be in reference to the Canadian government promising the Indigenous people rights to their land "as long as the grass is green and the water runs.", because of King's life as an Indigenous man in Canada. The significance of land in First Nations' culture and the politics of land claims are underscored throughout the text.

== Structure and narration ==
The narrator of the story is identified as "I." This character is a companion of Coyote, and knows the four escaped Aboriginal men personally. The unknown narrator is told the plot of the novel by each of the four in turn. This means that the reader hears the story through the unknown narrator, who heard the story from all of the four escaped Aboriginal men, who separately tell the story to the denizens of Blossom. To further complicate the narrative structure, the unknown narrator is telling this story not directly to the reader, but primarily to Coyote.

Interspersed in the four sections of the novel are four different stories of the creation, as told by four timeless Aboriginal women/gods: First Woman, Changing Woman, Thought Woman, and Old Woman. In each of these retellings, each woman meets both a figure from the Bible as well as a western literary figure, from whom she takes on a new name: Lone Ranger, Ishmael, Robinson Crusoe, and Hawkeye, respectively. These timeless women become the four "Indian Men" who escape the asylum, thus echoing the Trickster's ability to change genders.

== Merging oral and written tradition ==
Green Grass, Running Water has been hailed as a merger between oral and written tradition, as well as between Aboriginal and European-American cultures. The story has a dualism that is present throughout, starting with Coyote and Dog. In Green Grass, Running Water, Coyote is the Trickster of Aboriginal tradition, specifically Plains/Prairie tradition, whereas Dog thinks that he is "GOD", but is merely Coyote's dream.

Each of the four escaped Aboriginal men originally starts as a mythical figure from Aboriginal oral tradition. They then encounter Dog posing as "GOD," and a Biblical character and situation. They also each come across a western literary figure and take new names after them. First Woman becomes Lone Ranger, Changing Woman becomes Ishmael, Thought Woman becomes Robinson Crusoe, and Old Woman becomes Hawkeye. This constant merger between oral and literary traditions indicates "Green Grass, Running Water"'s constant disruption of western narrative tradition. By using satire and humor, King is comparing and contrasting the two traditions, highlighting faults as well as strengths.

== Reception ==
Green Grass, Running Water has been received positively, both within Native communities and without. King's book was a finalist for the 1993 Governor General's Award in Fiction. The book was championed as a novel for all Canadians by Glen Murray, former mayor of Winnipeg, in the Canada Reads 2004 contest.

Some elements of the book were incorporated into King's later CBC Radio comedy series The Dead Dog Café.
