= Paula Sherman =

Canadian writer, activist and educator

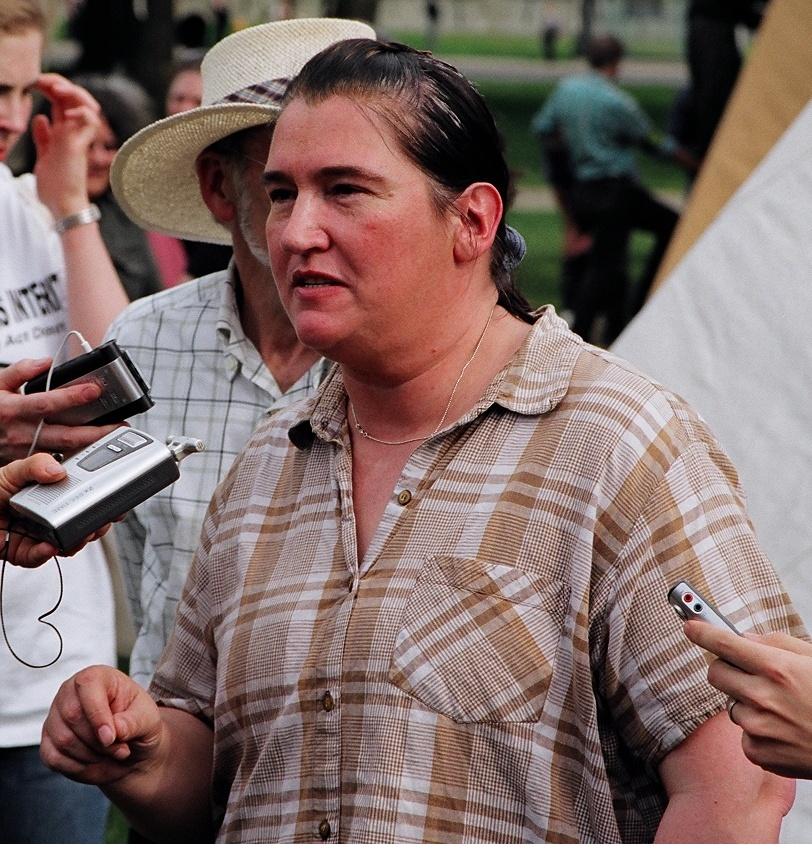
- Paula Sherman speaking at a protest at Queen's Park, Toronto
- Occupations: writer, activist, educator, professor of Indigenous Studies
- Employer: Trent University
- Known for: Indigenous rights activism

Paula Sherman is a Canadian writer, activist and educator. She is also a professor of Indigenous Studies at Trent University, in Peterborough, Ontario. Her book entitled Dishonour of the Crown: The Ontario Resource Regime in the Valley of the Kiji Sibi chronicles the Ardoch community's struggle to prevent uranium prospecting on their traditional lands and is published by Arbeiter Ring Publishing, Winnipeg, MB. She is also a contributor to Lighting the Eighth Fire: The Liberation, Resurgence and Protection of Indigenous Nations, a collection of essays written by emerging Indigenous activists and academics edited by Mississauga academic Leanne Betasamosake Simpson.

== Bibliography ==
- Dishonour of the Crown: The Ontario Resource Regime in the Valley of the Kiji Sibi, 2008, Arbeiter Ring Publishing, Winnipeg, MB.
