= Michelle Latimer =

Canadian actor and filmmaker

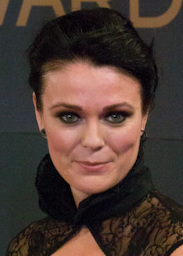
- Latimer at the Genie Awards in 2012
- Born: Thunder Bay, Ontario, Canada
- Occupations: Actress, director, filmmaker
- Years active: 2001–present

Michelle Latimer is a Canadian actress, director, writer, and filmmaker. She initially rose to prominence for her role as Trish Simkin on the television series Paradise Falls, shown nationally in Canada on Showcase Television (2001–2004). Since the early 2010s, she has directed several documentaries, including her feature film directorial debut, Alias (2013), and the Viceland series, Rise, which focuses on the 2016 Dakota Access Pipeline protests; the latter won a Canadian Screen Award at the 6th annual ceremony in 2018.

Latimer's 2020 film Inconvenient Indian won the People's Choice Award for Documentaries and the award for Best Canadian Film at the Toronto International Film Festival. She is also the co-creator, writer, and director of the CBC Television series Trickster.

== Early life ==
Latimer was born and raised in Thunder Bay, Ontario. Latimer later studied theatre at Concordia University in Montreal, Quebec.

== Career ==
Latimer initially garnered recognition for portraying goth teen Trish Simpkin in Paradise Falls. Aside from Paradise Falls, Latimer has had limited roles in other television productions. In 2004, she had two guest appearances on the low budget Canadian series Train 48. She also had a minor appearance in the 2004 film Resident Evil: Apocalypse.

After Paradise Falls, she returned to the stage, starring in Unidentified Human Remains and the True Nature of Love, written by Brad Fraser. She performed the play in 2004 at Crow's Theatre in Toronto and she played Benita, a psychic prostitute. Like Paradise Falls, the play also had some controversy for its open depiction of sexuality.

Latimer later produced and directed an animated film titled Choke, which was funded by bravoFACT and screened at the Sundance Film Festival and was one of five animated shorts nominated for a Genie Award in 2011.

Since the early 2010s, Latimer has dedicated her time to documentary filmmaking. In 2013, she made her feature film directorial debut Alias, which "follows aspiring rappers trying to escape the gangster life." The film received positive reviews, was nominated for several awards, including for a Canadian Screen Award, and screened at the Hot Docs Film Festival. Also in 2013, she was chosen as one of Playback's "10 To Watch".

Latimer's Viceland documentary series, titled Rise, which focuses on the 2016 Dakota Access Pipeline protests, premiered at the Special Events section of the 2017 Sundance Film Festival. The series won a Canadian Screen Award at the 6th annual ceremony in 2018. While accepting the award, Latimer delivered what was described by CBC News as "one of the night's most passionate speeches", in which she celebrated Indigenous resistance at Standing Rock.

In 2020, she was announced as the creator, writer, and director of the drama series Trickster. In advance of the television premiere, two episodes of the series was screened in the Primetime program at the 2020 Toronto International Film Festival, and at the Cinéfest Sudbury International Film Festival in Sudbury.

Trickster premiered on CBC Television on October 7, 2020. She adapted the series from Eden Robinson's 2017 novel Son of a Trickster. The series centres on Jared, an Indigenous Haisla teenager and small-time drug dealer in Kitimat, British Columbia, who becomes increasingly aware of the magical events that seem to follow him. The series was renewed for a second season prior to the first season's premiere; the second season was subsequently cancelled amidst controversy around her Indigenous identity. The CW acquired the U.S. broadcast rights for the series, which premiered in the country on January 12, 2021. In its December 2020 year in review, the Canadian film and television industry magazine Playback named Trickster the Scripted Series of the Year.

Latimer's documentary film, Inconvenient Indian, also premiered at the 2020 Toronto International Film Festival. Adapted from Thomas King's non-fiction book The Inconvenient Indian, the film presents a history of the indigenous peoples in Canada. The film blends scenes in which King, filmed in a taxi cab being driven by actress Gail Maurice in character as an indigenous trickster, narrates portions of his own book, blended with video clips of historical representation of indigenous peoples as well as segments profiling modern figures, such as Kent Monkman, Christi Belcourt, A Tribe Called Red, Alethea Arnaquq-Baril and Nyla Innuksuk, who are reshaping the narrative with their contemporary work in art, music, literature and film.

At the 2020 Toronto International Film Festival, Inconvenient Indian won the People's Choice Award for Documentaries and the award for Best Canadian Film. For Now and The Georgia Straight, Radheyan Simonpillai praised the film. The film was named to TIFF's year-end Canada's Top Ten list for feature films.

In October 2023, she directed two episodes of the Peacock streaming series Suburban Screams.

=== Other work ===
Latimer also works as a film curator; she was a programmer for the ImagineNATIVE Film + Media Arts Festival, the Hot Docs Film Festival and is a programming advisor for the Regent Park Film Festival.

== Indigenous identity controversy ==
Through much of her career, Latimer identified as having Algonquin and Métis heritage, based on a family oral history of Indigenous ancestry in the province of Quebec. In interviews, Latimer has said that her father is French-Canadian and that her mother is Algonquin and Métis. In a September 2020 interview about her film and TV projects, she stated that her mother had a complicated relationship with her mixed race identity.

In December 2020, her Indigenous identity came into question after a National Film Board (NFB) press release announcing the release of her film Inconvenient Indian stated a connection to the community of Kitigan Zibi in Quebec, which the community denied. Latimer subsequently apologized for having claimed historical roots to the Kitigan Zibi community before fully verifying them, and resigned from the production of her television series Trickster, after the husband and wife producing team of Tony Elliott and Danis Goulet resigned from the show, citing the questions and criticism about Latimer's ethnic identity as their reason. Latimer's documentary film Inconvenient Indian was also withdrawn from the 2021 Sundance Film Festival, all other film festivals, and from distribution, by the NFB until further notice.

In responding to journalists, Latimer said her identification as Indigenous rested on the oral history of her maternal grandfather who talked about being Indigenous and sometimes used the term "Métis". She said: "I never had reason to question what my family had told me. I'd again say that going back to identity is complex... Identity is not just about ancestral connection. It is about our values and our worldview and how those are incorporated. I grew up in the North, I grew up with those teachings. And that, for me, is what makes me Indigenous."

Latimer produced genealogical records to bolster her claim that she was a 'non-status Algonquin'; these claims were rejected by tribal leaders. Census records reviewed by CBC News suggest that Latimer's grandfather was French-Canadian. However, Dominique Ritchot, a genealogist and researcher with an expertise in French-Canadian families, claimed that Latimer had two Indigenous ancestors dating from 1644, while most of her other ancestors were identifiable as French Canadian, Irish and Scottish. Later, Sébastien Malette, an associate professor in the Department of Law and Legal Studies at Carleton University, and Siomonn Pulla, an associate professor in the College of Interdisciplinary Studies at Royal Roads University produced a joint genealogical report which found that Latimer has Indigenous ancestry from both her paternal and maternal lines that originated from a "historical community of Baskatong that was known for its Algonquin and Métis population."

In January 2021, it was reported that Latimer served CBC with a notice of libel, claiming to "have grave concerns about the fairness and accuracy" of the CBC's reporting on her ancestry. Latimer elaborated that the CBC "created a false narrative about my character and my lineage." She maintains: "The CBC article painted a picture of someone who is misrepresenting themselves as a fake and a liar. All I can say is that I never misrepresented who I was. I never intended to mislead anyone who I worked with. I tell Indigenous stories because that feels true to my experience, and it's what I love to do. The fact that I've been painted as someone who has been profiting for my own gain feels so unfair and misguided."

An Algonquin Elder from Kitigan Zibi, Annie Smith St. Georges (known for her work with the National Arts Centre) posted on Facebook that Latimer was connected with her indigenous ancestors by marriage, "the grand niece of my grandpa and grandma, who were originally from Mishomis Baskatong." However, Jean Teillet, the great-grand niece of Métis leader Louis Riel, denied that a distant connection qualified someone as indigenous, telling CBC that "from my perspective, it's a fantasy" and "Most of the legitimate Métis groups ... they don't accept people who just find an ever-so-great grandmother back in the 1600s. That doesn't work. That is not a culture. It's just a genealogical fact."

In October of the same year, Latimer withdrew the CBC lawsuit without formal explanation.

== Accolades ==
Year	Association	Category	Nominated work	Result	Ref.
2012	Gemini Awards	Best Animated Short	Choke	Nominated	
2013	Hot Docs Film Festival	Best Canadian Documentary	Alias	Nominated	
2015	Canadian Screen Awards	Best Biography or Arts Documentary Program or Series	Alias	Nominated	
2015	Yorkton Film Festival	Golden Sheaf Award - Short Subject	The Underground	Won	
2018	Canadian Screen Awards	Best Documentary Program	Rise	Won	
2020	Toronto International Film Festival	People's Choice Award for Documentaries	Inconvenient Indian	Won	
2020	Toronto International Film Festival	Best Canadian Film	Inconvenient Indian	Won	
2020	Toronto International Film Festival	Amplify Voices Award: BIPOC Directors	Inconvenient Indian / Michelle Latimer	Nominated	
2020	Toronto International Film Festival	Top Ten Canadian Film	Inconvenient Indian	Won	
2020	Directors Guild of Canada Awards	Allan King Award for Best Documentary	Inconvenient Indian	Won	
2020	Vancouver International Film Festival	Most Popular Canadian Documentary	Inconvenient Indian	Won	
2020	Montreal International Documentary Festival	National Feature	Inconvenient Indian	Won	
2020	Montreal International Documentary Festival	Magnus Isacsson Award	Inconvenient Indian / Michelle Latimer	Won	

== See also ==
- List of female film and television directors
