= List of organizations that self-identify as FNIM governments =

These organizations, located primarily within Canada, self-identify as First Nations, Inuit, or Métis (FNIM) heritage groups, or descendant communities, but they are not federally recognized as First Nations, Inuit, or Métis governments (bands) or tribes. Some organizations that self-identify as Métis tribes are located in the United States. There are no federally recognized Métis tribes in the United States, although some citizens of federally recognized American Indian tribes are of Métis heritage.

For organizations that are recognized by the government of Canada as First Nations band governments, see List of First Nations band governments.

Many of these organizations are not accepted as being First Nations, Inuit, or Métis by established First Nations bands or Native American tribes. Some of the organizations are regarded as fraudulent. Some organizations are described as Corporations Posing as Indigenous Nations (CPAINs).

== About ==
The Assembly of Manitoba Chiefs defines "“Unrecognized” First Nations" (UFNs) as a "First Nation that is not formally recognized as a Band under the Indian Act."

According to the lawyer and author Jean Teillet, "Self-declared ["Eastern Métis"] organizations are appearing almost daily. Their existence does not, by itself, provide proof of community or Indigenous identity."

The activist Crystal Semaganis, leader of the Ghost Warrior Society, testified in the House of Commons of Canada that her organization had "tracked over 300 fraudulent corporations that exist in Canada that seek to present the fact that they are indigenous when in fact they are not. They're essentially hobby clubs. However, they enjoy unfettered access to indigenous resources."

The Acadian Society of New Brunswick (SANB), a Francophone organization representing Acadians, and the Mi'gmawe'l Tplu'taqnnl (MTI), an organization that represents Miꞌkmaq First Nations in New Brunswick, reject "Acadian Métis" identity. SANB and MTI have stated that only the Red River Métis are Métis. Between the early 2000s and 2017, almost 30 Métis-identifying organizations have been created in Quebec and Nova Scotia, none of which are recognized by the Canadian federal government. The scholars Darryl Leroux and Adam Gaudry have written that "Eastern Métis" organizations are engaging in what they refer to as "settler self-indigenization".

== List of groups self-identifying as FNIM governments in Canada ==
Following is a list of groups known to self-identify as First Nations, Inuit, or Métis governments or tribes but that are not recognized by the federal Canadian government, the U.S. federal government (Bureau of Indian Affairs), or by any state government in the US.

=== Alberta ===
1. Aseniwuche Winewak Nation
2. Lubicon Lake Indian Nation
3. Michel Band

=== British Columbia ===
1. Chakastaypasin First Nation - recognized by the James Smith Cree Nation, but not recognized by the federal Canadian government.
2. Kelly Lake, British Columbia
3. Sinixt Nation

=== New Brunswick ===
1. Peskotomuhkati Nation

=== Nova Scotia ===
1. Bras d'Or First Nation - organization that self-identifies as a Miꞌkmaq First Nation; it is not recognized by the Canadian federal government or the Union of Nova Scotia Mi'kmaq.

=== Ontario ===
1. Ardoch Algonquin First Nation
2. Namaygoosisagagun First Nation
3. Shabot Obaadjiwan First Nation

=== Newfoundland and Labrador ===
1. NunatuKavut - the NunatuKavut Community Council (NCC) is a collective that self-identifies as southern Inuit and previously was known as the "Labrador Métis Nation". The NCC is not recognized as Indigenous by either the federal Canadian government or by neighboring Innu or Inuit communities such as the Innu Nation or the Nunatsiavut Government. The Innu Nation and Nunatsiavut Government regard the NCC as fraudulent.

=== Quebec ===
1. Métis Nation of the Rising Sun (MNRS) - an organization located on the Gaspé Peninsula of Quebec.

=== Saskatchewan ===
1. Stoney Knoll First Nation

== List of organizations self-identifying as Métis tribes in the United States ==
Unlike Canada, the United States federal government does not recognize Métis people as a distinct tribe or nation. No Métis-identifying groups in the United States are federally recognized as tribes. People who self-identify as Métis have formed Métis heritage organizations in several states.

=== Florida ===
1. Church of the Métis Tribe.

=== Indiana ===
1. United Métis Tribe
  1. Buffalo Spirit Band of the United Métis Tribe
  2. Nimkii Band of the United Métis Tribe
2. The Zibiodey / River Heart Metis Association/Band

=== Maine ===
1. Métis Eastern Tribal Indian Society of Maine

== See also ==
- Cherokee descent
- Cherokee heritage groups
- Congress of Aboriginal Peoples
- Ghost Warrior Society
- Índia pega no laço
- Indigenous identity fraud in Canada and the United States
- Indigenismo
  - Indigenismo in Mexico
  - Indigenismo in the United States
- List of First Nations band governments
- List of First Nations peoples in Canada
- List of organizations that self-identify as Native American tribes
- Métis Nation of Ontario
- Native American identity in the United States
- Non-status Indian
- Pretendian
- Qalipu First Nation
- State-recognized tribes in the United States
- Taíno
  - Taíno heritage groups
