= Thomas King (novelist) =

Canadian writer and broadcast presenter (born 1943)

Thomas King CC
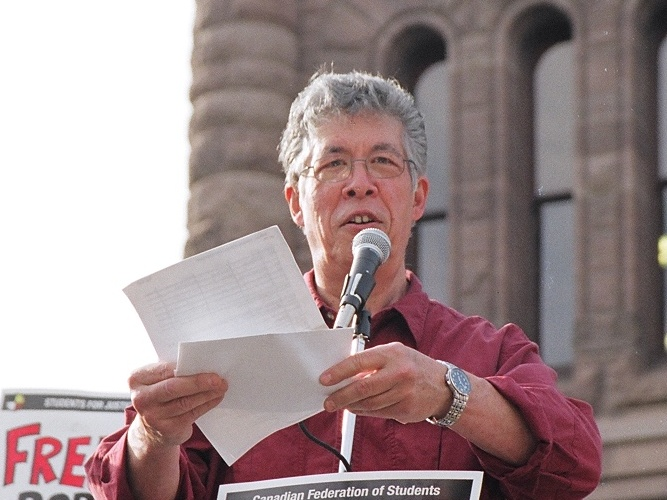
- King in 2008
- Born: Thomas Hunt King; April 24, 1943 (age 83); Roseville, California, United States
- Citizenship: United States; Canada
- Education: Chico State University (BA, MA); University of Utah (PhD)
- Occupations: Writer; Broadcaster; Academic; Activist
- Partner: Helen Hoy
- Children: 3
- Writing career
- Pen name: Hartley GoodWeather
- Period: 1980s–present
- Genres: Novels; Short stories; Children's literature; Nonfiction
- Subject: First Nations
- Notable works: Medicine River; Green Grass, Running Water; The Truth About Stories; The Inconvenient Indian
- Notable awards: Order of Canada (Member, 2004; Companion, 2020); RBC Taylor Prize (2014); Governor General's Award for English-language fiction (2014); Stephen Leacock Memorial Medal for Humour (2021)

Thomas King (born April 24, 1943) is an American-born Canadian writer and broadcast presenter who most often writes about First Nations. Though he previously said that he was of partial Cherokee descent, King accepted findings by genealogists in 2025 that he has no Indigenous ancestry.

== Early life and education ==
Thomas Hunt King was born in Roseville, California, on April 24, 1943.

King says his father left the family when the boys were very young, and that they were raised almost entirely by their mother. In his series of Massey Lectures, eventually published as a book The Truth About Stories (2003), King tells that after their father's death, he and his brother learned that their father had two other families, neither of whom knew about the third.

=== Education ===
As a child, King attended grammar school in Roseville, California, and both private Catholic and public high schools.

King left Sacramento State University after failing his first year. He held several jobs including craps dealer and bank teller, as well as photographer and photojournalist in New Zealand and Australia. He returned to the United States of America in 1967.

King went on to complete a bachelor's degree in 1970 and a master's degree in 1972, both in English literature, at Chico State University. In 1986, he earned a PhD in English and American studies from the University of Utah. His dissertation, Inventing the Indian, examined white portrayals of Indigenous people, Indigenous oral literature, and the work of contemporary Indigenous writers.

=== Ethnicity ===
King is of Greek and German descent. However, until 2025 he believed he had Indigenous ancestry. According to King, he had been told by his mother that his estranged father was part-Cherokee. In 2025, genealogical research into King's family history by the Tribal Alliance Against Frauds (TAAF) determined that King has no Cherokee or other Indigenous ancestry. King himself also pursued investigations into his ancestry, the results of which confirmed the TAAF's findings.

== Early career ==
After moving to Canada in 1980, King taught Native studies at the University of Lethbridge (Alberta) in the early 1980s. He also served as a faculty member of the University of Minnesota's American Indian studies department. As of 2020, King was listed as Professor (retired) and Professor Emeritus in the School of English and Theatre Studies at the University of Guelph (Ontario).

== Activism ==
King has criticized policies and programs of both the United States and Canadian governments in many interviews and books. He is worried about Aboriginal prospects and rights in North America. He says that he fears that Aboriginal culture, and specifically Aboriginal land, will continue to be taken away from Aboriginal peoples until there is nothing left for them at all. In his 2013 book The Inconvenient Indian, King says, "The issue has always been land. It will always be land, until there isn't a square foot of land left in North America that is controlled by Native people."

King also discusses policies regarding Aboriginal status. He noted that legislatures in the 1800s in the United States and Canada withdrew Aboriginal status from persons who graduated from university or joined the army. King has also worked to identify North American laws that make it complicated to claim status in the first place, for example, the US Indian Arts and Crafts Act of 1990 or Canada's 1985 Bill C-31. Bill C-31 amended the Indian Act in 1985 to allow Aboriginal women and their children to reclaim status, which the Act had previously withdrawn if the woman married a non-status man. King claims that the amended act, though progressive for women who had lost their status, threatens the status of future generations because of its limitations.

== Writings ==
King has been writing novels, children's books, and collections of stories since the 1980s. His notable works include A Coyote Columbus Story (1992) and Green Grass, Running Water (1993) – both of which were nominated for a Governor General's Award (the former for children's literature, and the latter for fiction – and The Inconvenient Indian: A Curious Account of Native People in North America (2012), which won the 2014 RBC Taylor Prize. King's novel, Indians on Vacation (2020), won the Stephen Leacock Memorial Medal for Humour in 2021.

King was chosen to deliver the 2003 Massey Lectures, entitled The Truth About Stories: A Native Narrative. King was the first Massey lecturer of self-identifying aboriginal descent. King explored the Native experience in oral stories, literature, history, religion and politics, popular culture and social protest in order to make sense of North America's relationship with its aboriginal peoples.

King's writing style incorporates oral storytelling structures with traditional Western narrative. He writes in a conversational tone; for example, in Green Grass, Running Water, the narrator argues with some of the characters. In The Truth About Stories, King addresses the reader as if in a conversation with responses. King uses a variety of anecdotes and humorous narratives while maintaining a serious message in a way that has been compared to the style of trickster legends in Native American culture. Within this story, King also integrates the recently popularized idea of turtles all the way down in an anecdote introducing this narrative, calling into the relevancy of this ideology in American and Native American history.

== Politics ==
In April 2007 King announced that he would seek the New Democratic Party (NDP) nomination for federal electoral district of Guelph. On March 30, 2007, he was named the NDP candidate. NDP leader Jack Layton was present at the nomination meeting. A by-election was called in the riding due to the resignation of incumbent Liberal Member of Parliament Brenda Chamberlain, effective April 7, 2008. Scheduled for September 8, 2008, the by-election was cancelled with the calling of the October 14, 2008, federal general election. King finished fourth behind Liberal candidate Frank Valeriote, Conservative candidate Gloria Kovach, and Green candidate Mike Nagy.

Guelph – 2008 Canadian federal election
Party	Candidate	Votes	%	±%
Liberal	Frank Valeriote	18,977	32.22%	-6.17
Conservative	Gloria Kovach	17,185	29.18%	-0.57
Green	Mike Nagy	12,456	21.15%	+12.43
New Democratic	Thomas King	9,709	16.49%	-5.51
Marijuana	Kornelis Kleverling	172	0.27%	N/A
Libertarian	Philip Bender	159	0.27%	N/A
Communist	Drew Garvie	77	0.13%	-0.05
Animal Alliance	Karen Levenson	73	0.12%	N/A
Independent	John Turmel	58	0.10%	N/A
Marxist–Leninist	Manuel Couto	29	0.05%	-0.02

== Other work ==
In the 1990s, he served as story editor for Four Directions, a CBC Television drama anthology series about First Nations which was held up by production and scheduling delays until finally airing in 1996. He also wrote the teleplay "Borders", an adaptation of his own previously published short story, for the series.

From 1997 to 2000, King wrote and acted in a CBC radio show, The Dead Dog Café Comedy Hour, which featured a fictitious town and a fictitious radio program hosted by three First Nations characters. Elements were adapted from his novel, Green Grass, Running Water. The broadcast was a political and social satire with dark humour and mocking stereotypes.

In July 2007, King made his directorial debut with I'm Not the Indian You Had in Mind, a short film which he wrote.

His book of shorter poems, 77 Fragments of Familiar Ruin, includes short poems, many along native themes.

In 2020, his book The Inconvenient Indian was adapted by Michelle Latimer as a documentary film, Inconvenient Indian.

== Personal life ==
His partner is Helen Hoy, a professor emerita of English and Women's Studies at the University of Guelph, School of English and Theatre Studies. She has written a study, How Should I Read These? Native Women Writers in Canada, (2001). He has three children. The couple resides in Guelph, Ontario.

== Works ==
=== Books ===
- Medicine River (Viking Canada, 1990), novel
- A Coyote Columbus Story (Douglas & McIntyre, 1992), illustrated by William Kent Monkman – Governor General's Award finalist
- Green Grass, Running Water (Houghton Mifflin, 1993), novel featuring Coyote, OCLC 26632171 – Governor General's Award finalist
- One Good Story, That One (1993), stories
- Borders (1993)
- Coyote Sings to the Moon (1998), illus. Johnny Wales
- Truth and Bright Water (HarperFlamingo Canada, 1999)
- The Truth About Stories (House of Anansi Press, 2003); US edition The Truth About Stories: a native narrative (U. of Minnesota Press, 2005) – Massey Lectures
- Coyote's New Suit (2004), illus. Johnny Wales
- A Short History of Indians in Canada (HarperCollins, 2005), stories – McNally Robinson Award winner
- A Coyote Solstice Tale (Groundwood Books, 2009), illus. Gary Clement
- The Inconvenient Indian: A Curious Account of Native People in North America (Doubleday Canada, 2012)
- The Back of the Turtle (Doubleday, 2014) – Governor General's Award winner
- 77 Fragments of Familiar Ruin (2019) - Poems
- Indians on Vacation (2020)
- Sufferance (2021)
- Aliens on the Moon (2025)

DreadfulWater Mysteries

- Dreadful Water Shows Up (2002), published under the pen name Hartley GoodWeather (reprinted 2017 as DreadfulWater, as author Thomas King)
- The Red Power Murders (2006), as Hartley GoodWeather (reprinted 2017, as author Thomas King )
- Cold Skies (2018)
- A Matter of Malice (2019)
- Obsidian (2020)
- Deep House (2022)
- Double Eagle (2023)
- Black Ice (2024)

As editor

- The Native in Literature (1987)
- An Anthology of Short Fiction by Native Writers in Canada (1988)
- All My Relations: An Anthology of Contemporary Canadian Native Fiction (Toronto: McClelland & Stewart, 1990)

=== Selected short stories ===
Short story collections are listed above.

- "Coyote and the Enemy Aliens" (HarperCollins, 2012), ebook, OCLC 877892260

=== Scripts ===
- Four Directions (CBC Television, 1996), drama anthology series, as editor and sometime writer
- The Dead Dog Café Comedy Hour (CBC Radio, 1997 to 2000) and its sequels (2002 and 2006)
- I'm Not The Indian You Had In Mind, 2007, short film also directed by King

== Awards and recognition ==
=== Literary awards ===
- Nominated for a Governor General's Award in 1992 for A Coyote Columbus Story.
- Nominated for a Governor General's Award in 1993 for Green Grass, Running Water.
- Won the Stephen Leacock Memorial Medal for Humour in 2021 for Indians on Vacation
- Green Grass, Running Water was chosen for the inclusion in the 2004 edition of Canada Reads, and championed by then-Winnipeg mayor Glen Murray. In the 2015 edition of Canada Reads, his non-fiction book The Inconvenient Indian was defended by activist Craig Kielburger.
- A Short History of Indians in Canada won the 2006 McNally Robinson Aboriginal Book of the Year Award.
- The Inconvenient Indian won the 2014 RBC Taylor Prize, and was a finalist for the 2013 Hilary Weston Writers' Trust Prize for Nonfiction and the 2014 Burt Award for First Nations, Métis and Inuit Literature.
- The Back of the Turtle won the Governor General's Award for English-language fiction at the 2014 Governor General's Awards
- Indians on Vacation was shortlisted for the Rogers Writers' Trust Fiction Prize, and for the Governor General's Award for English-language fiction at the 2020 Governor General's Awards.

=== Honors ===
- In 2004, King was made a Member of the Order of Canada.
- In November 2020, King was named a Companion of the Order of Canada. The naming was because of King's "enduring contributions to the preservation and recognition of indigenous culture, as one of North America’s most acclaimed literary figures"

=== Other ===
- Selected in 2003 to give the Canadian Broadcasting Corporation (CBC) Massey Lectures. The series, entitled The Truth About Stories, was published that year by the House of Anansi Press.

== See also ==
- Native American studies
- 2008 Canadian federal by-elections
