= Frontenac Ventures Corporation =

Frontenac Ventures Corporation is a privately owned uranium mining and exploration company. Frontenac was formed to open a new mine in North Frontenac, Ontario. The mine was opposed by First Nations and other persons in the area, leading to a blockade and injunctions. The venture was abandoned after Frontenac Ventures failed to get funding for the project.

Frontenac staked the land for uranium exploration in the Sharbot Lake area of Ontario. The land is the traditional territory of Algonquins First Nations peoples in the area and is unceded that is the basis of a land claim. Members of the First Nation barricaded the entrance when it was discovered Frontenac had started exploration on the land. Members of the Shabot Obaadjiwan and Ardoch First Nations opposed the prospect of uranium mining along with non-native cottage owners and an array of concerned citizens. Issues range from the land title to concerns about taking uranium out of the ground, and defensive car bomb testing being done on the land for the military.

On October 12, 2007, the protesters left the blockade after Frontenac Ventures agreed to a mediation process with representatives of the First Nations groups along with representatives of the Canadian and Ontario governments. The mediation was abandoned in 2008 and several First Nations leaders were fined for contempt of court.

In 2010, Frontenac Ventures was still looking for funding for the project and abandoned plans for immediate construction of the mine.
