= Rise (Canadian TV series) =

Canadian documentary television series

Rise is a Canadian documentary television series, which aired on Viceland and APTN in 2017. Directed by Michelle Latimer and hosted by Sarain Fox, the eight-episode series profiles various indigenous activists engaged in resistance against oppression.

Several episodes of the series received a preview screening at the 2017 Sundance Film Festival shortly before the program's television premiere.

The series won the Canadian Screen Award for Best Documentary Program or Series at the 6th Canadian Screen Awards.
