= The Inconvenient Indian =

2012 nonfiction book by Thomas King

- First edition cover
- Author: Thomas King
- Publisher: Doubleday Canada
- Publication date: November 13, 2012
- Awards: Governor General's Award for English to French translation (2014); RBC Taylor Prize (2014)
- ISBN: 978-0-385-66421-9

The Inconvenient Indian: A Curious Account of Native People in North America is a book by American-Canadian author Thomas King, first published in 2012 by Doubleday Canada. It presents a history of Indigenous peoples in North America. The book has been adapted into a documentary film titled Inconvenient Indian directed by Michelle Latimer, which premiered at the Toronto International Film Festival in 2020.

Although King claimed to be of partial Cherokee descent when The Inconvenient Indian was published, King accepted findings by genealogists that he has no Indigenous ancestry in 2025.

== Summary ==
King's work is an account of the history of indigenous rights and treaties in North America. He notes the portrayal of indigenous peoples in popular media as having contributed greatly to public knowledge of North American Indians. The book ends on the following note: "If the last five hundred years are any indication, what the Native people of North America do with the future should be very curious indeed."

== Publication history ==
- King, Thomas (November 13, 2012). The Inconvenient Indian: A Curious Account of Native People in North America. Toronto: Doubleday Canada. ISBN 978-0-385-66421-9. OCLC 791164629.
- King, Thomas (February 17, 2014). L'Indien malcommode : un portrait inattendu des Autochtones d'Amérique du Nord. Translated by Daniel Poliquin. Boréal. ISBN 978-2-764-62259-9.
- King, Thomas (October 17, 2017). The Inconvenient Indian Illustrated: A Curious Account of Native People in North America. Doubleday Canada. ISBN 978-0-385-69017-1.

== Reception ==
=== Reviews ===
Publishers Weekly referred to The Inconvenient Indian as "intelligent and eye-opening". They highlighted how "King demonstrates with sharp and swift strokes how the U.S. and Canada have repeatedly treated Natives as an inconvenience, an obstacle to be rid of, moved, or carefully rounded up, then reimagined altogether. It’s also a book that charts how such injustices are often replaced by kinder, more audience-friendly historical narratives".

According to Kirkus Reviews, King's "wit and storytelling talent make the book easy to read; more importantly, his humor may keep readers from wanting to scream at the injustices". Publishers Weekly similarly noted how King "scathes, chides, and often pokes fun" throughout the book, which "suffers from a unilaterally sardonic tone that seethes with understandable indignation but leaves too little space for hope or progress".

Kirkus Reviews concluded that, despite having "way too many lists", The Inconvenient Indian is "a solid book and a good look at what can be done in the future of Indian-white relations".

=== Awards and honours ===
In 2015, The Inconvenient Indian was nominated for the Canada Reads competition, where it was defended by Craig Kielburger. It won the Canada Reads foreshadowing event from the Lennoxville Library, defended by Tim Belford.

Awards for The Inconvenient Indian
Year	Award	Result	Ref.
2013	Hilary Weston Writers' Trust Prize for Nonfiction	Nominated	
2013	NAISA Prize for Best Subsequent Book	Won	
2013	Trillium Book Award	Finalist	
2014	British Columbia National Award for Canadian Non-Fiction	Won	
2014	Burt Award for First Nations, Métis and Inuit Literature	Finalist	
2014	Governor General's Award for English to French translation	Won	
2014	RBC Taylor Prize	Won	

== Adaptations ==
The Inconvenient Indian was adapted into a documentary film titled Inconvenient Indian directed by Michelle Latimer, which premiered at the Toronto International Film Festival in 2020. The film won Best Canadian Feature Film at the festival.
