= Obsidian (novel) =

2020 novel by Thomas King

- First edition
- Author: Thomas King
- Series: DreadfulWater #5
- Genre: Mystery
- Publisher: HarperCollins Canada
- Publication date: 2020
- Media type: Print, Online
- Pages: 384
- ISBN: 9781443457088
- Preceded by: A Matter of Malice

Obsidian (also entitled The Obsidian Murders) is the fifth novel in Thomas King's DreadfulWater mysteries. The novel, published in early 2020, is his fifth novel about an investigator named Thumps DreadfulWater.

== Plot ==
As DreadfulWater investigates the murder of a Reality TV producer he begins to suspect he is investigating a murderer who killed his girlfriend, years ago.

== Response ==
The Vancouver Sun listed it with 29 other bestselling books.

In his review published in the Seattle Post-Intelligencer, Richard Marcus wrote:

Anybody who has read any of the previous books in this series will be delighted to see the familiar faces of DreadfulWater's friends showing up throughout the pages of this book. These support characters are a wonderful mixture of exasperating and loving and help make the book's tone lighter than you'd expect for a novel about a serial killer.
