= Lac-Douaire =

- Unorganized territory
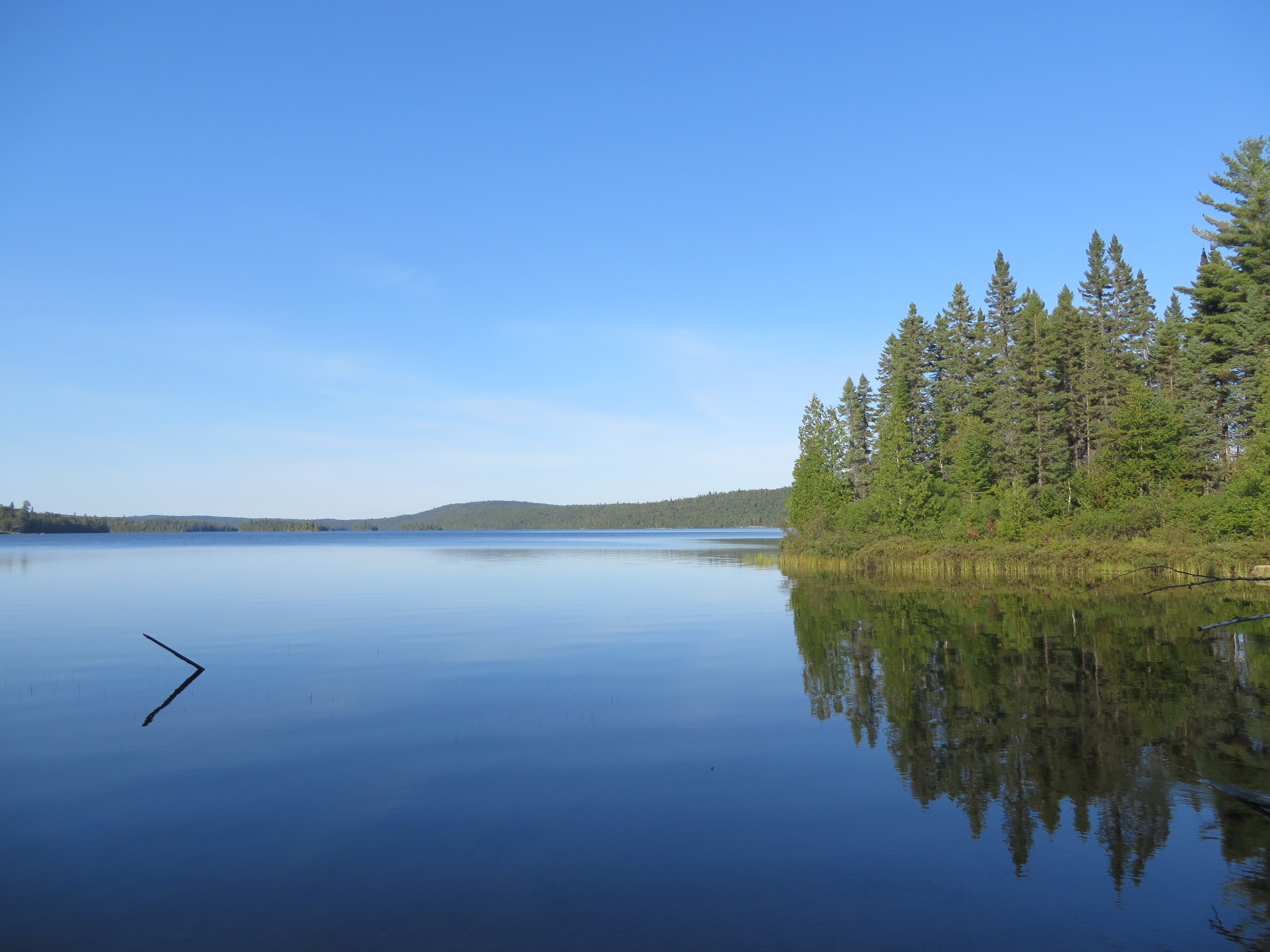
- Lake Douaire

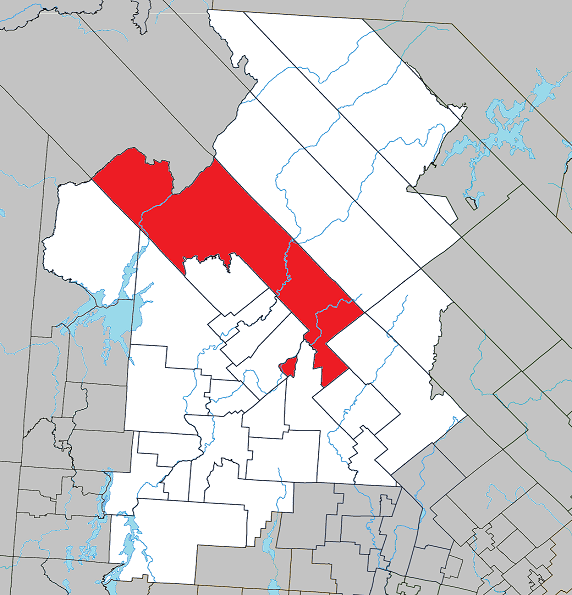
- Location within Antoine-Labelle RCM

- Location in central Quebec
- Coordinates: 47°10′N 75°48′W
- Country: Canada
- Province: Quebec
- Region: Laurentides
- RCM: Antoine-Labelle
- Constituted: January 1, 1986

Government
  - Federal riding: Laurentides—Labelle
  - Prov. riding: Labelle

Area
  - Total: 2,128.81 km^{2} (821.94 sq mi)
  - Land: 1,957.99 km^{2} (755.98 sq mi)

Population (2021)
  - Total: 5
  - Density: 0/km^{2} (0/sq mi)
  - Pop (2016-21): 0.0%
  - Dwellings: 2
- Time zone: UTC−5 (EST)
  - Summer (DST): UTC−4 (EDT)
- Highways: No major routes

Lac-Douaire (French pronunciation: [lak dwɛʁ]) is an unorganized territory of Quebec, Canada. It is the largest geo-political division in the Laurentides region, and one of eleven unorganized areas in the Antoine-Labelle Regional County Municipality.

The namesake Lake Douaire is located in the northern part of the territory.

== Demographics ==
Historical census populations – Lac-Douaire

Year	Pop.	±%
1991	0	—
1996	2	—
2001	0	−100.0%
2006	0	0.00%

Year	Pop.	±%
2011	5	—
2016	5	+0.0%
2021	5	+0.0%

Source: Statistics Canada

== See also ==
- List of unorganized territories in Quebec
