= Baskatong Reservoir =

Reservoir in Quebec, Canada

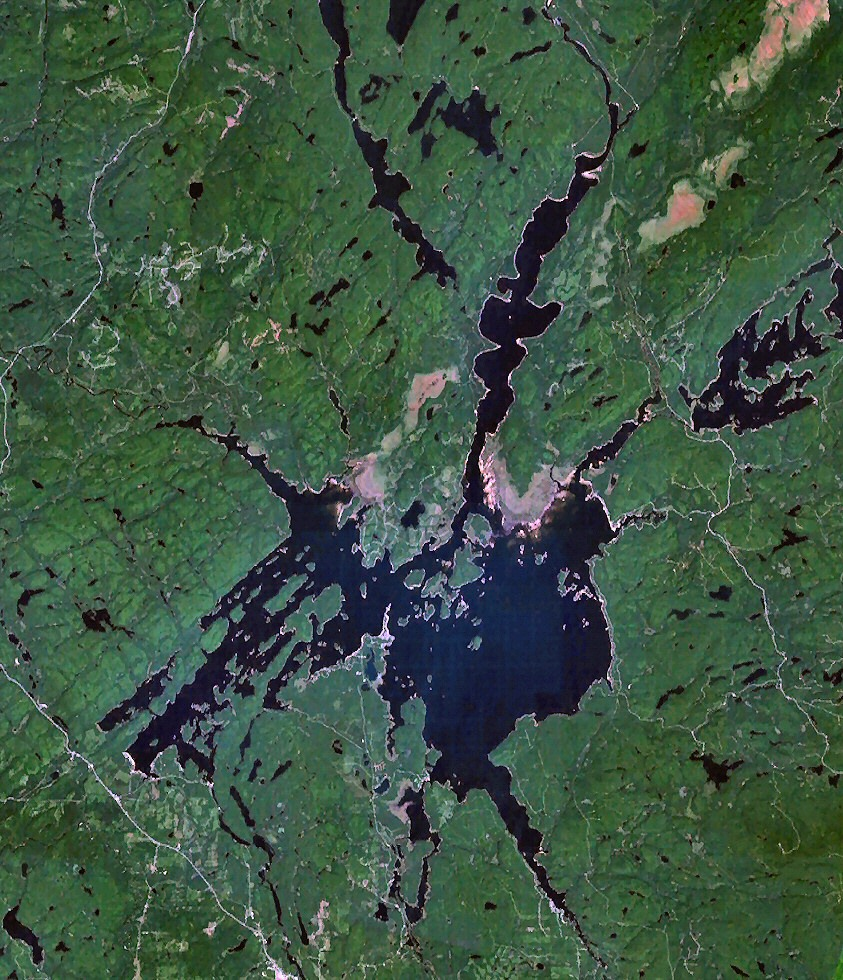
- Highway 117 is visible in the lower left corner

- Location in Quebec
- Location: Antoine-Labelle RCM / La Vallée-de-la-Gatineau RCM, Quebec
- Coordinates: 46°48′N 75°48′W
- Type: Artificial
- Primary inflows: Gatineau River
- Primary outflows: Gatineau River
- Basin countries: Canada
- Max. length: 30 km (19 mi)
- Max. width: 25 km (16 mi)
- Surface area: 413 km^{2} (159 sq mi)
- Max. depth: 96 m (315 ft)
- Shore length^{1}: 2,800 km (1,700 mi)
- Surface elevation: 207 m (679 ft) - 223 m (732 ft)
- Islands: over 160
- Settlements: Grand-Remous
- ^{1} Shore length is not a well-defined measure.

The Baskatong Reservoir (French: Réservoir Baskatong) is an artificial lake in western Quebec, Canada. It has a highly irregular form with numerous islands and deep inlets, and an area of 413 square kilometres (159 sq mi).

The reservoir is named after the geographic township in which it is located. Baskatong Township was already named on the 1870 map by Eugène Taché, and the name comes from an Algonquin word obiskitawang or obaskitaong, meaning "a place where the water is constricted by sand", and probably referring to the inlets of the lake that preceded the reservoir. Another theory states that it derived from baskaton, meaning "folded lake", referring to the lake's bulging ice in the winter.

== History ==
The reservoir was formed following the construction of the Mercier Dam (fr) in 1927 Due to the dam's name, the reservoir was also known as Mercier Reservoir until the name Baskatong Reservoir was made official in 1962. Since 2007, a 55 MW generating station is in operation at the site of the dam, the reservoir also being used to control the flow of the Gatineau River for several hydroelectric generating stations downstream.

== Geography ==
Its primary source is the Gatineau River. Other significant sources are:

- Gens de Terre River
- Notawassi River (fr)
- Rivière d'Argent (fr)

Baskatong Reservoir is accessible by several short forest roads off Route 117, about 200 kilometres (120 mi) north of Ottawa, and about 290 kilometres (180 mi) north-west from Montreal.

== Fish species ==
Baskatong Reservoir is a popular location for fishing and has over 20 outfitters established on its shores. Fish species present are walleye, northern pike, lake trout, whitefish, and landlocked salmon.

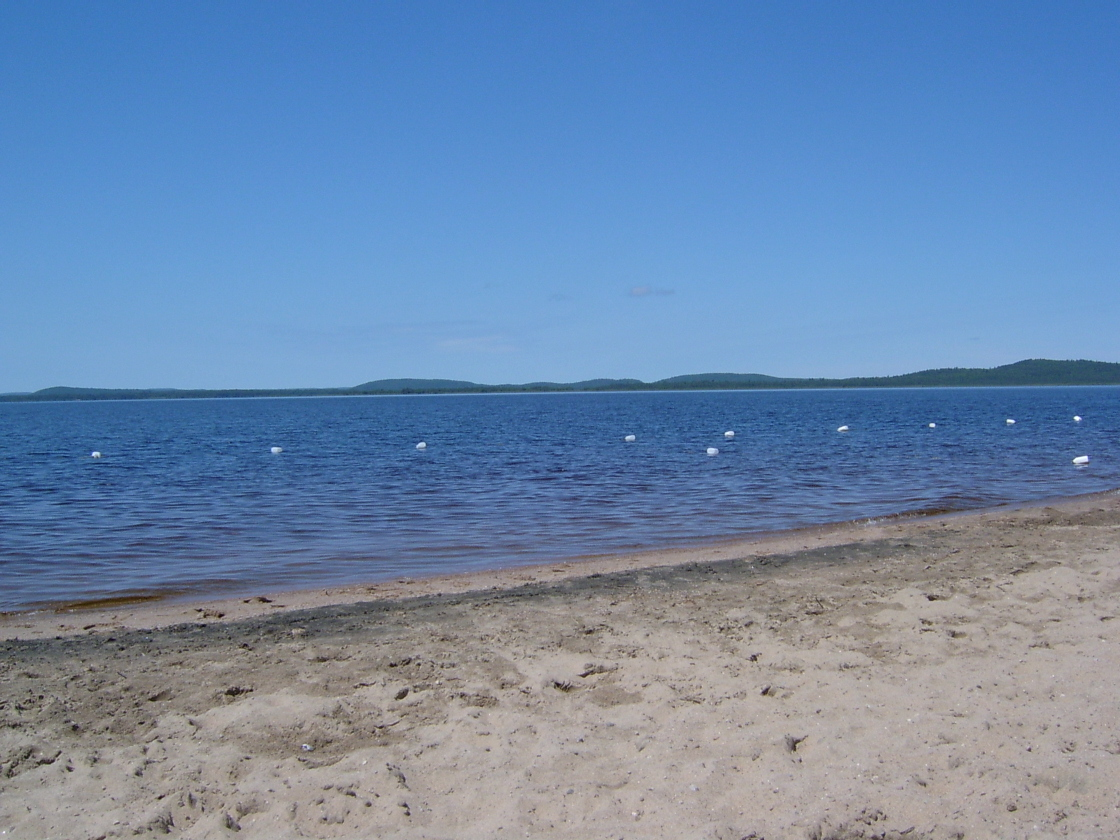

== See also ==
- List of lakes of Quebec
