= List of Native American and First Nations law resources =

== United States ==
=== General law resources and databases ===
- Native American Rights Fund
- National Indian Law Library
- Indian Law Resource Center
- Indian Law Research Guides
- National Tribal Justice Resource Center
- Native American Law Research Guide (Georgetown Law Library)
- Tribal Law Gateway
- Native American Constitution and Law Digitization Project
- American Indian Law Center, Inc.
- American Indian Policy Center
- Bureau of Indian Affairs, U.S. Department of the Interior
- National Congress of American Indians
- National American Indian Court Judges Association
- National Native American Law Enforcement Association
- Tribal Court Clearinghouse
- Native American Law Center Resources (University of Washington)
- Tribal Law and Policy Institute
- American Indian Law Resources (Northwestern University)
- Native American Law Resources (University of Oklahoma)
- American Indian Law: A Beginner's Guide from the Library of Congress
- Native American Law Guide: Federal Indian Law and Tribal Law materials (University of California at Los Angeles)
- Law Library of Congress' Indians of North American Guide
- Native American civil rights
- National Congress of American Indians
- Indian Law (Harvard Law Review) (multiple pages of cases)
- Tribal Access to Justice Information
- Institute for Native Justice

=== Tribal law materials by each individual tribe ===
- Tribal Law Gateway
- Indian Law and Order Commission

=== Tribal recognition ===
- Native American Tribal Recognition

=== Tribal sovereignty ===
- Tribal sovereignty in the United States
- Indigenous self-government in Canada

=== Tribes are sovereign governments, not racial classifications ===
- Tribes are governments, not racial classification,
- Morton v. Mancari
- Native American Tribal Enrollment
- Santa Clara Pueblo v. Martinez

=== Citizenship ===
- Native American Citizenship
- The Politics of Inclusion: Indigenous Peoples and U.S. Citizenship, by Rebecca Tsosie (UCLA Law Review)
- Native American identity in the United States
- Determining Native American and Indigenous Canadian identities (WP:IPNA essay)

=== Border crossing rights ===
- Native American Citizenship and Borders

=== Land claims ===
- Indian Claims Commission, entire 43 volume set of claims decisions from 1946 to 1978 can be found here, or downloadable here, or with access to ProQuest here.
- Indian Trust settlements

=== Water and land rights ===
- Native American Water & Land Rights
- American Indian Territoriality: An Online Research Guide (downloadable PDF)
- Indigenous land rights
- Aboriginal title in the United States

=== Ritual object repatriation ===
- Reading list on U.S.Tribe relations regarding ritual object repatriation

=== Sacred sites and places protection ===
- Native American Sacred Places research
- Native American Sacred Sites and the Federal Government
- Challenges to Sacred Site Protection, by Rebecca Tsosie
- Old Ground and New Directions at Sacred Sites on the Western Landscape by Kristen A. Carpenter

=== Arts and Crafts laws ===
- Indian Arts and Crafts Act of 1990
- Tribal Law and Order Act (2010)
- Indigenous Intellectual Property
- Indian arts and crafts laws
- Cherokee Nation Truth in Advertising for Native Art

=== Peacemaking and conflict resolution ===
- Indigenous Native American Peacemaking

=== Civil rights ===
- Civil Rights Act of 1968
- Native American civil rights

=== Repatriation and reburial of remains, artifacts and cultural property ===
- Repatriation and reburial research resources (link also has good book resources)

=== Tribal education ===
- Tribal Education law
- Language and Diversity Program, Native Education Program (Southwest)
- National Indian Education Association
- Laws pertaining to Indian residential schools

=== Child welfare ===
- Child welfare and children's rights

=== Identification ===
- Indigenous identity, being, and belonging
- Native American identity in the United States
- Warren, Trump, and the Question of Native American Identity, (Harvard Law Review)
- Santa Clara Pueblo v. Martinez, 436 U.S. 49 (1978)

=== Environment, environmental justice, climate change ===
- General climate science reports
- Tribal Climate Change Guide
- Facing the Storm: Indian Tribes, Climate-Induced Weather Extremes, and the Future for Indian Country (report of the National Wildlife Federation)
- Environmental Protection in Indian Country (EPA)

=== Tribal trademark law ===
- Tribal Trademark Law
- Washington Redskins trademark dispute

=== By states or regions ===
- List of federally recognized tribes in the contiguous United States
- List of Alaska Native tribal entities
- Alaska Federation of Natives
- Alaska Native Justice Center
- Affiliated Tribes of Northwest Indians
- Montana Indian Law

== Canada ==
=== General law resources and databases ===
- Indigenous law/Indigenous legal traditions (University of Victoria)
- Truth and reconciliation commission of Canada
- Indigenous law and Aboriginal law (Toronto Metropolitan University)
- Indigenous peoples and the law (University of Calgary)
- Aboriginal law and Indigenous law (Queens University)

=== Border crossing rights ===
- Native American Citizenship and Borders

=== Identification ===
- A path through difficult conversations about Indigenous identity, Canadian Bar Association
- The Population Boom of the Self-Identified Indigenous and our Dwindling Nationhood The Council of Canadians

== See also ==
- Canadian Aboriginal law
- Native American reservation politics
- Hawaiian sovereignty movement - not North America, but part of the United States
- List of United States Supreme Court cases involving Indian tribes
- Indian country jurisdiction
