= Native American civil rights =

Legal, social, or ethical principles pertaining to Native Americans

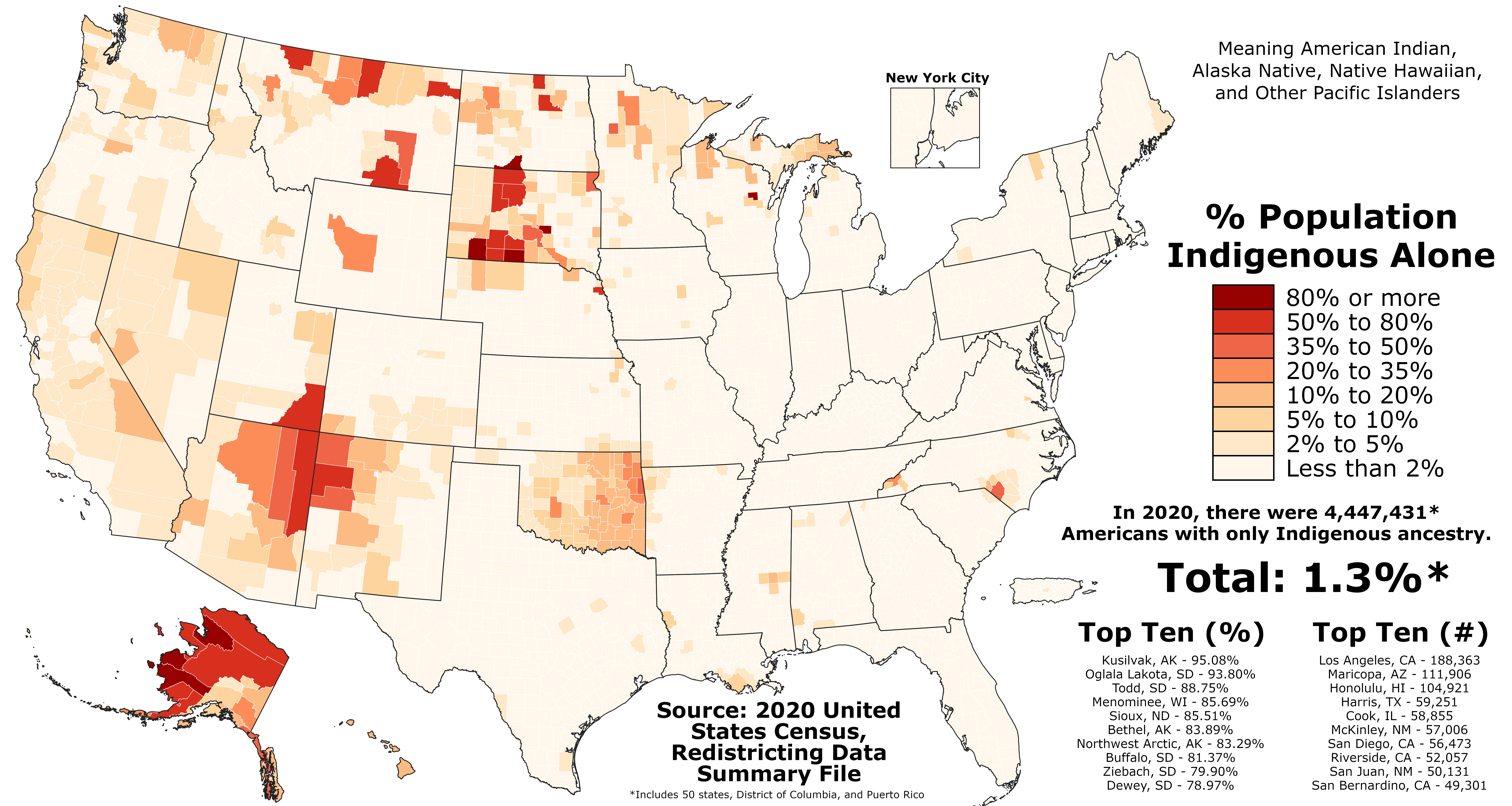
Proportion of Indigenous Americans in each county of the fifty states, the District of Columbia, and Puerto Rico as of the 2020 United States Census

Native American civil rights are the civil rights of Native Americans in the United States. Native Americans are citizens of their respective Native nations as well as of the United States, and those nations are characterized under United States law as "domestic dependent nations", a special relationship that creates a tension between rights retained via tribal sovereignty and rights that individual Natives have as U.S. citizens. This status creates tension today but was far more extreme before Native people were uniformly granted U.S. citizenship in 1924. Assorted laws and policies of the United States government, some tracing to the pre-Revolutionary colonial period, denied basic human rights—particularly in the areas of cultural expression and travel—to indigenous people.

Although the many tribes and peoples indigenous to the United States have varying civil rights priorities, there are some rights that nearly all Native Americans are actively pursuing. These include the protection of voting rights and resistance to the cultural assimilation of Native Americans. Many tribes that live on Indian reservations are currently facing the destruction of surrounding environments and water sources, depressed economies, sexual violence against women, and substance abuse.

== Precontact with Europeans ==
The Americas were populated thousands of years before Europeans arrived in North and South America. As a consequence of this long-term existence in the continent, Native American cultures, origins, religions, and languages became vastly diverse. Agriculture and written language had developed independently in the Americas before European contact, with the domestication and cultivation of beans, squash, and maize being of particular importance.

=== Religious practices ===
Traditional religious practices among Natives range from individual prayers, rituals, and offerings to large intertribal ceremonies. Precontact religion was often closely tied to the land and the environment. These concerns include the omnipresent, invisible universal force, and "the three 'life crises' of birth, puberty, and death", spiritual beings, revelations, human intercessors into the spirit world, and ceremonies that renew communities.

== 1585–1786: Initial meetings ==
In 1585, an American Indian tribe on the eastern coast of North America made contact with English explorer Richard Grenville, who set up a settlement called Roanoke Colony. The Native people proved hospitable and receptive to Grenville, however, when a small silver cup was stolen from him, Grenville and his men sacked and burned down an entire village in revenge. By 1586, the English settlement had been abandoned. Grenville returned to England with a Native American captive called Raleigh.

In 1607, decades after the interaction between the tribe's folk and Grenville, Captain John Smith established the colony of Jamestown in the middle of the Powhatan Confederacy in what is now Virginia. Powhatan, the leader of the Confederacy, refrained from attacking the colonists as they established their settlement. Despite this, conflicts quickly broke out between the colonists and the Confederacy. Chief Powhatan wrote in a letter to John Smith:

I have seen two generations of my people die...I know the difference between peace and war better than any man in my country... Why will you take by force what you may have quietly by love? Why will you destroy us who supply you with food? What can you get by war? We can hide our provisions and run into the woods; then you will starve for wronging your friends. Why are you jealous of us? We are unarmed, and willing to give you what you ask, if you come in a friendly manner, and not so simple as not to know that is it much better to eat good meat, sleep comfortably, live quietly with my wives and children, laugh and be merry with the English, and trade for their copper and hatchets, than to run away from them and to lie cold in the wood, feed on acorns, roots, and such trash, and be so hunted that I can neither eat nor sleep... Take away your guns and swords, the cause of all our jealousy, or you may all die in the same manner.

In the winter of 1609 through 1610, the residents of Jamestown had little food or effective shelter as they experienced the Starving Time. In December 1609, John Ratcliffe, who succeeded Smith as president of the colony, and around 50 colonists went to meet with a group of Powhatan Indians to bargain for food. However, they were ambushed and only 16 survived. Ratcliffe was captured and later tortured to death. This marked the beginning of First Anglo-Powhatan War. The Powhatan Confederacy integrated and cared for some of the colonists who deserted Jamestown to live with them, as they were much more prepared for the harsh winter. In the summer of 1610, when the governor of Virginia Colony, Lord De la Warr requested that Powhatan return the runaways, the Powhatan chief showed no intention to bring them back. In response, the colonists raided and sacked the Paspahegh capital, which was a tributary tribe to the Powhatan, killing at least 15 Natives, and kidnapping the wife of the village chief and their children. The war lasted until 1614, however, conflict resumed in 1622, when the Powhatan massacred Jamestown in March 1622, killing around a third of the inhabitants, 347 colonists. This caused second Anglo-Powhatan War that would last until 1632.

=== Christianization and assimilation ===
Many European missionaries believed that it was their sacred duty and calling from God to convert Native Americans to Christianity. Spaniards practiced Christianization in the New World using Pope Alexander VI's papal bull, Inter caetera. This allowed rulers to assert control over [non-Christian] countries and islands "discovered" by Columbus, including their residents and inhabitants, and convert them to Catholicism.

English missionaries developed "praying towns" to create "orderly Christian communities filled with model converts who were living and working under the watchful eye of a priest or pastor". Within these communities, converts to the Christian faith would be placed in a separate area from the remainder of the tribe in order to prevent regression back to their native beliefs. Missionaries such as John Eliot, a Puritan, and Isaac McCoy, a Baptist, led the way in the spread of their beliefs within these types of towns and among the natives. These towns led the way to the future separation of the natives from the remainder of society in Native American reservations.

== 1787–1899: Creating the Constitution ==
See the Indian Appropriations Acts.

The 1851 Indian Appropriations Act allocated funds to move Western tribes onto Indian reservations where they would be protected and enclosed by the United States government. According to the federal government at that time, reservations were to be created in order to protect the Indians from increasing numbers of White Americans moving to the West.

== 1900–1945 ==
=== Criticizing colonialism ===
Native peoples have been active in educating nonnatives on the cultures, histories, and experiences of their tribes since the beginning of colonization. Chief Plenty Coups of the Crow Nation in Montana and Alfred Kiyana of the Meskwaki Settlement in Iowa spoke to historians, anthropologists, and journalists through translators to criticize the idea of "American progress" and to express pride and faith in the identities of their own cultures.

Charles Eastman, a Mdewakanton and Wahpeton Sioux and physician, published books and articles in English for American people to show that it is not savage that Native people celebrate what Mourning Dove called the "ancient way". In 1902, Gertrude Bonnin told the Atlantic Monthly that the traditions of her tribe, the Yankton Dakota Sioux, were not only equal to European Americans, but that their values were superior.

=== Involvement with United States politics ===
In 1903, Charles Eastman, a Santee Dakotan and Native representative, was requested by Theodore Roosevelt to help Sioux people choose English names in order to protect their lands from being taken. Lands registered with the birth and natural names of Natives were often lost due to confusion the United States government employees had with filling paperwork.

The United States government has a strong history making deals with Native Americans and not keeping them. Thomas Bishop, a Snohomish man, recorded his elders' memories of U.S. promises and compared them to the actual texts in treaties. He published a piece based on these discrepancies in 1915 titled "An Appeal to the Government to Fulfill Sacred Promises Made 61 Years Ago". Following this, he and other citizens of Pacific Northwest tribes organized all the Tulalip agency reservations and several off-reservation communities into the Northwestern Federation of American Indians with the goal of redeeming promises made in treaties.

== Post World War II: 1946–1959 ==
Many Native Americans aided the United States in World War II. Veterans came back from serving, only to find that the U.S. government and American people would not recognize their contributions to the war effort. This encouraged Natives to begin moving towards activism that was more focused on tribal sovereignty and self-determination.

Advocacy groups, such as the National Congress of American Indians (NCAI), which was founded in 1944, began representing tribal interests to the public and to Congress. The NCAI's founding members came from a wide variety of professionals including veterans, anthropologists, lawyers, elected state and federal officials, and a professional baseball player, George Eastman, and half of them had previously served on Indian Rights Association-chartered tribal councils. At least four of them were also members of the Society of American Indians.

== Civil rights movement era: 1960–1968 ==
In 1961, the National Indian Youth Council formed in pursuit of "a greater Indian America". The organization members were young and had grown out of a summer program that brought students from all around the U.S. to Boulder, Colorado, and introduced to the Southwest Regional Indian Youth Council so that they could learn about the Native state of affairs. The organizations' members, people such as Clyde Warrior, Melvin Thom, Vine Deloria Jr., and Hank Adams, rejected beliefs that Natives were unable to help themselves or that they needed to adopt American society as their own. They were seen as an upset to norms in the Native community, as they were much younger than other recognized leaders of Native civil rights movements. They emphasized direct protest action and pursued federal recognition of several then-unrecognized Native nations. They also organized the first conference where unrecognized Native community members, tribal chiefs, and U.S. chairpersons shared a public stage.

=== Indian Civil Rights Act of 1968 ===
With the law of the Indian Civil Rights Act (ICRA) at the time, also called the Indian Bill of Rights, the indigenous people were guaranteed many civil rights they had been fighting for. The ICRA supports the following:

- Right to free speech, press, and assembly
- Protection from unreasonable invasion of homes
- Right of criminal defendant to a speedy trial, to be advised of the charges, and to confront any adverse witnesses
- Right to hire an attorney in a criminal case
- Protection against self incrimination
- Protection against cruel and unusual punishment, excessive bail, incarceration of more than one year and/or a fine in excess of $5,000 for any one offense
- Protection from double jeopardy or ex post facto laws
- Right to a jury trial for offenses punishable by imprisonment
- Equal law protection due process

Other civil rights such as sovereignty, hunting and fishing, and voting are still issues facing Native people today.

== Contemporary movements (1969–present) ==
There has been increased dialogue around the controversy of using Native American symbols such as for school or team mascots. Concerns are that the use of the symbols distort Native American history and culture and often stereotype in offensive ways. In 2020, the Washington Redskins retired their name and logo (which depicted a side profile of a Native American man), following public outcry that the team's branding was offensive to Native Americans. In a statement, the Navajo Nation said the decision marked a "historic day for all Indigenous peoples around the world as the NFL Washington-based team officially announced the retirement of the racist and disparaging 'Redskins' team name and logo".

There has been significant controversy, including a number of protests, around oil pipelines that run near tribal territory, particularly the Dakota Access Pipeline and the Keystone XL Pipeline. Many Native American tribes and people believe the pipelines threaten their water supply, could damage cultural and religious sites, and violate treaties guaranteeing "undisturbed use and occupation" of tribal land.

After years of lack of schooling for Natives Americans, the National Indian Education Association (NIEA) was created to give equal education to Natives in 1969.

In April 2023, Native American advocates, such as the Native American Journalist Association, went to the United Nations to seek legal recognition of Indigenous people's rights to own their own media on an equal footing with other media outlets, and for the prosecution of those who persecuted their journalists.

== Religious rights ==
=== Religion after Euro-American contact ===
Over the last five centuries, "Christianity has made enormous inroads into Native society." Many religious Native Americans today voluntarily practice Christianity, both Protestantism and Roman Catholicism, or even both altogether. There was both voluntary and forced conversion; however, not all tribes embraced Christianity, nor did all members of tribes.

"Euro-American contact and interactions contributed much to Indian marginality and the disruption and destruction of traditional customs and even the aboriginal use of psychoactive substances. This process was noted in the 1976 Final Report to the American Indian Policy Review Commission, Task Force Eleven: Alcohol and Drug Abuse.

The American Indian Religious Freedom Act was passed in 1978. It allowed freedom of religion except for some restrictions on use of ceremonial items as the eagle feathers or bones (a protected species) or peyote (considered a restricted drug by the federal government); however, other laws provide for ceremonial use of these by Native American religious practitioners.

One example of Christianity's influence on Native American religion is the prominence of the figure of Jesus Christ in peyote ceremonies of the Native American Church, which is a syncretic religion.

Many indigenous religions arose in response to colonization. These include the Longhouse Religion, which arose at the end of the 18th century, and the Ghost Dance, Four Mothers Society, Indian Shaker Church, Kuksu religion, and others in the 19th century.

=== Suppression during the Progressive Era ===
During the Progressive Era from the 1890s to the 1920s, a "quasi-theocracy" reigned in what federal policymakers called "Indian Country"; they worked hand-in-hand with churches to impose Christianity upon Native Americans "as part of the government's civilizing project". Keeping in the vein of the colonialists before them, Progressive-Era policymakers found no need to separate religious endeavors concerning Native Americans from Native political policy. The government provided various religious groups with funds to accomplish Native American conversion. It was during this time that the government "discouraged or imposed bans on many forms of traditional religious practices, including the Sun Dance, use of peyote in ceremonial settings and observance of potlatch rituals." The Bureau of Indian Affairs (BIA), or the "Indian Office", as it was then called, played a role in the Christianization of Native Americans. Their boarding schools, often staffed by missionaries, removed Native children from the tribe and away from the influence of their cultures.

In order to pacify Christians, "some tribal religious practitioners modified elements of their traditional practices". In the case of the Sun Dance, "a ceremony of renewal and spiritual reaffirmation", some tribes "omit[ted] the element of self-sacrifice (many participants observed the ritual of skin piercing), reduced the number of days for the ceremony from eight to two and otherwise emphasized the ceremony's social, rather than religious, features". In the past, tribes have also moved religious days to coincide with national U.S. holidays.

Until 1935, Native American people could be fined and sent to prison for practicing certain traditional religious beliefs.

=== Contemporary Native American religious issues ===
Established in 1918, the Native American Church "emphasiz[ed] the importance of monogamy, sobriety, and hard work". Today, it serves as an intertribal, multilingual network. The Native American Church has had a long struggle with the government of America due to their ancient and deeply spiritual religious practice using peyote. This psychoactive substance is found on a cactus and is used for healing practices and in religious ceremonies. The use of this substance is highly debated due to the outbreaks of drug use among Americans today. Leaders of the Native American Church argue that the use of peyote allows for a direct connection with gods and that peyote is not taken simply for its psychoactive effects. It is taken in the manner that one might take the sacraments of Christianity. "Peyote is not habit forming and 'in the controlled ambiance of a peyote meeting it is in no way harmful.'" Rather it is considered a unifying influence on the Native American life because it provides the "basis for Indian friendships, rituals, social gatherings, travel, marriage, and more. It has been a source of healing and means of expression for a troubled people. And it has resulted in one of the strongest pan-Indian movements among American Indians".

For years the government has been debating the subject of peyote use. In 1949 peyote use was condemned by the American Medical Association because findings in their study led them to believe that it was a habit-forming drug. Congress then attempted to regulate the use of peyote in 1963 with little success, but under the Drug Abuse Control Act in 1965 it was on the list of forbidden psychedelic drugs. Under this act, it did not place this on Native American peyotists who were using it for religious practice, though some suffered still under the hands of the state governments for having it in their possession. State laws differed from the United States government standards with states outlawing the use of peyote. "By 1970, of the seventeen states that still had anti-peyote laws, only five did not provide exemptions for Indians to use peyote ritually." These were amended under the pressure from the Native American Church member if the members showed proof that they were at least 25 percent Native American. The states laws were generally similar to those of South Dakota, which says that "when used as a sacrament in services of the Native American Church in a natural state which is unaltered except for drying or curing or slicing", peyote use is permitted. In 1978 the American Indian Religious Freedom Act there was mention of protection for peyote users, but this did not change the fact that they could still be charged. Because it is an "established religion of many centuries' history...not a 20th century cult nor a fad subject to extinction at a whim", it continues to be somewhat protected under the law.

== Sovereignty ==
All Indigenous tribes are under the United States just as other major groups. However, unlike other minority groups who are immigrants to the United States, Native Americans are indigenous to American land and have therefore earned sovereignty. It is difficult to describe Native American government in a definite manner due to the fact that there are many different Native tribes with different forms of governance. In January 2016 there were *566 federally recognized Native American tribes. During the colonial period, Native American sovereignty was upheld by the negotiation of treaties between British proprietors and Native American tribes. Treaties are rules between the tribe and government. The treaties were made with the agreement that the tribes had equal sovereignty as the sovereignty of the colonial governments. The treaties ended in 1871 with the Indian Appropriations, which changed recognition of the tribes to "domestic dependent nations" rather than independent nations.

== Fishing and hunting rights ==
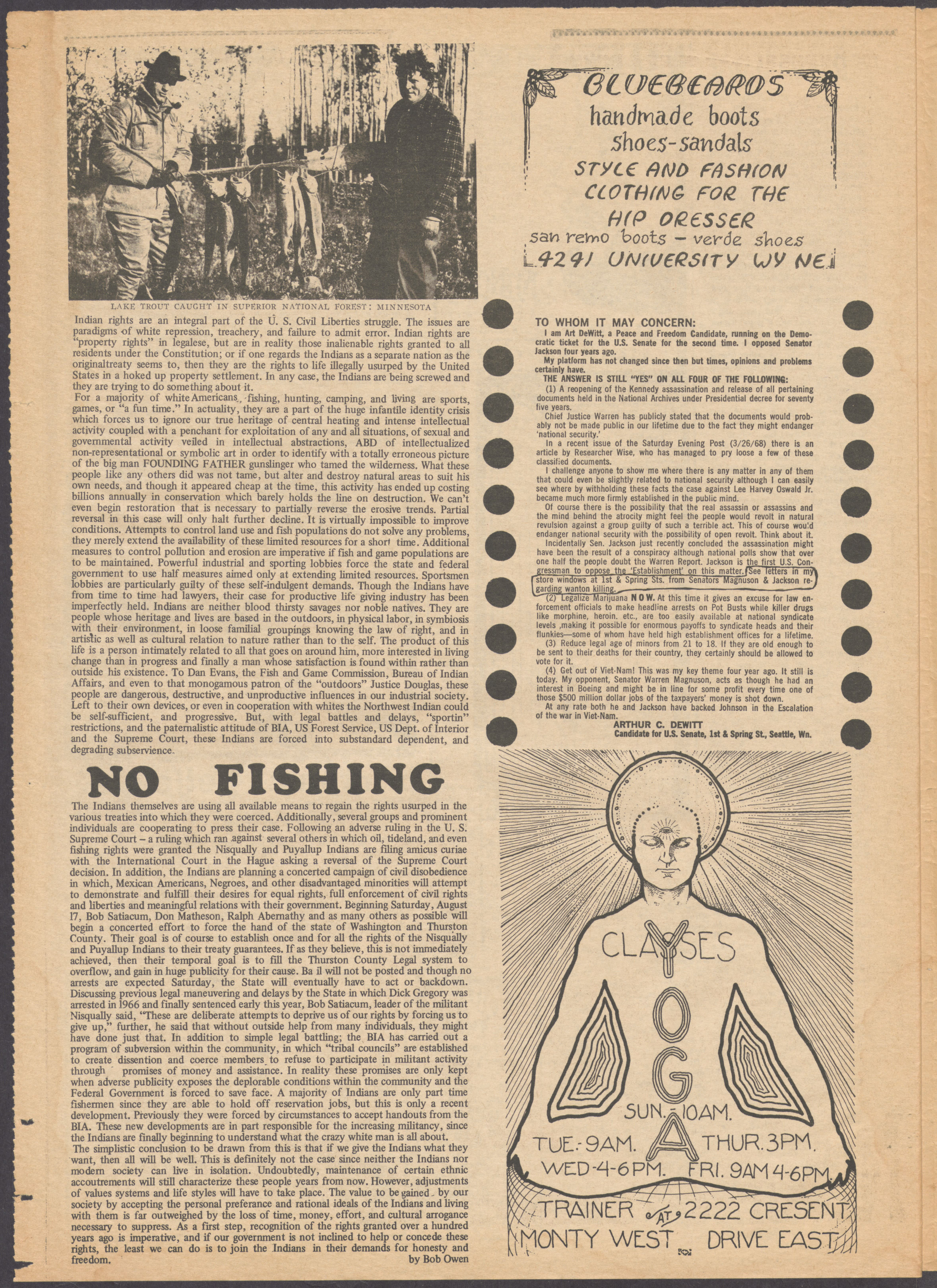
A 1968 column in the Seattle underground paper Helix argues for Native American fishing rights.

Although Native Americans lost the battle for their lands, the U.S. government eventually conceded hunting and fishing rights both within the reservations and on old tribal land that had been sold to and settled. The reserved rights doctrine allowed for tribes to hunt and fish, along with any other rights, as long as they were not specifically denied in a treaty. This angered hunters and fishers who had restrictions placed on them by the government and they protested against the Natives' right to fish and hunt off of reservations.

As the United States continued to colonize more of the continent that they could, they began making treaties with tribes, so that they could have reservations of land. One particular treaty with the Yakama in the Northwest guarantees that the tribe has the rights to "taking fish at all usual and accustomed places in common with the citizens of the Territory". However, in the 1890s, Lineas and Audubon Winans operated a state-licensed fishing mill in Celilo Falls, an important place for fishing to not only the Yakama, but also the Umatilla and the Nez Perce. The Winans decided to develop a fish wheel to catch salmon by the tons, which would deplete the river of fish for the Natives very quickly. In addition, the Winans purchased land that made it impossible for Native people to approach the river at all. The Yakama took this case to the Supreme Court in United States v. Winans (1905) and earned their rights back to fish and to have treaties interpreted by the United States as the members of tribes would have interpreted them at the time.

State agencies pointed out that conservation efforts were possibly compromised by the Native Americans' habits; however the Supreme Court upheld the privilege with certain cases, such as Antoine v. Washington (1975), even going so far as to appropriate for Native Americans the right to hunt and fish on all of their old grounds whether or not they were currently privately owned, and to prevent private owners from erecting obstacles to exercising this right. The largest amount of opposition and resentment towards Native Americans' fishing and hunting rights stems from the Pacific Northwest.

In 1988, the United States government passed a federal Indian Gaming Regulatory Act, which provides the legislative basis for protecting Native lands for their community health and economic growth.

== Traveling rights ==
During the 19th and early 20th centuries, the U.S. government attempted to control the travel of American Indians off Indian reservations. Since American Indians did not obtain U.S. citizenship until 1924, they were considered wards of the state and were denied various basic rights, including the right to travel. The Bureau of Indian Affairs (BIA) discouraged off-reservation activities, including the right to hunt, fish, or visit other tribes. As a result, the BIA instituted a "pass system" designed to control movement of the Indians. This system required Indians living on reservations to obtain a pass from an Indian agent before they could leave the reservation. In addition, agents were often ordered to limit the number of passes they issued for off-reservation travel. The reasons cited for this limitation were that Indians with passes often overstayed the time limits imposed, and many times Indians left without requesting passes. When this occurred, the military was frequently called to force the Indians to return their reservations. For example, in April 1863, Superintendent J. W. Perit Huntington forced 500 American Indians to return from the Willamette Valley after they had violated the pass system and estimated that up to 300 Indians were still in the area without U.S. authorization.

While attempting to implement this pass system, the BIA received numerous complaints regarding Indians who traveled without permission. Many complained that American Indians were killing game merely for the sport and were taking the hides. Other settlers complained that Indians overstayed their visits at neighboring reservations while neglecting their farming duties at home. For example, in December 1893, Governor John E. Osborne of Wyoming wrote a letter to the BIA protesting that Indians from Fort Hall, Lemhi, Wind River, and Crow Reservations were leaving illegally. In response, the commissioner sent a note to all Indian agents stating that Indians who disobeyed the pass system would be arrested and punished by state officials. Additional rules were also implemented at this time. For example, the Indian agents were now required to notify other reservations of the departure time of Indians, names of Indians, and the route they intended to follow.

In addition to these concerns, many settlers were unhappy with the travel of American Indians on the railroads. For example, the Central Pacific Railroad in Nevada had granted Indians the privilege of riding on the roof and flatbeds of rail cars without tickets, in exchange for the right-of-way through their reservations. Other railroad lines, including the Carson and the Colorado allowed free railroad travel to the Indians. Paiute Indians, for example, frequently rode the trains to their traditional hunting and fishing grounds. "Paiutes would pack up their gathering baskets and hop on the rails, take off a day or two to gather seeds, and bring their harvest back home again, on the car roofs. Men and women used free passes to travel into town or to ranches farther in the hinterlands for jobs." Angry Indian agents, who wanted the Paiutes to stay under their jurisdiction, wrote letters urging the BIA to stop this free travel. According to one Indian agent, "The injurious effects of this freedom from restraint, and continual change of place, on the Indian, can not be overestimated."

The loss of the right to free movement across the country was difficult for American Indians, especially since many tribes traditionally traveled to hunt, fish, and visit other tribes. The passage of the Indian Citizenship Act in 1924 granted United States citizenship to all Indians born in America. As a result, American Indians were finally granted free travel in the United States. At the present time, American Indians who live on reservations are free to travel as they wish.

== Voting ==
Beginning in the 18th century and with the creation of the Constitution, there was a struggle to define the relationship between Native tribes and the United States, and the terms of citizenship for tribe members. For example, in the determination of a state's number of House Representatives, Article I, Section 3 of the Constitution states that "Indians not taxed" are not to be included. However, the Constitution also stated that Congress has the power to "regulate Commerce with foreign Nations, and among the several States, and with the Indian tribes" (Article I, Section 8).

In 1817, the Cherokee became the first Native Americans recognized as U.S. citizens. Under Article 8 of the 1817 Cherokee treaty, "Upwards of 300 Cherokees (Heads of Families) in the honest simplicity of their souls, made and election to become American citizens." In 1831, however, Cherokee Nation v. Georgia, one of the three Marshall Trilogy cases, helped define the limits of tribal sovereignty. The Cherokee nation was determined to be a domestic dependent nation, a relationship that "resembles that of a ward to a guardian". This definition meant that Native people did not have a right to vote. Thus, Native Americans' relationship to the U.S. government continued to be similar to that of people in an occupied land under the control of a foreign power. Further clarification was made in 1856 when Attorney General Caleb Cushing stated, "Indians are the subjects of the United States, and therefore are not, in mere right of home-birth, citizens of the United States.

After the passage of the first Civil Rights Act in 1866, and adoption of the Fourteenth Amendment in 1868, the terms and limits of Native citizenship were further confirmed. The Civil Rights Act of 1866 states, "That all persons born in the United States, and not subject to any foreign power, excluding Indians not taxed, are hereby declared to be citizens of the United States". Some officials were not prepared for Natives to become citizens and resisted calls for Native suffrage. During Senate floor debates regarding the Fourteenth Amendment, Senator Jacob Howard of Michigan commented, "I am not yet prepared to pass a sweeping act of naturalization by which all the Indian savages, wild or tame, belonging to a tribal relation, are to become my fellow-citizens and go to the polls and vote with me". This sentiment was echoed by James Rood Doolittle of Wisconsin, who argued that, "there is a large mass of the Indian population who are clearly subject to the jurisdiction of the United States who ought not to be included as citizens of the United States ... the word 'citizen,' if applied to them, would bring in all the Digger Indians of California". Doolittle was concerned that the proposed amendment would, "declare the Utes, the Tabahuaches, all those wild Natives to be citizens of the United States, the Great Republic of the world, whose citizenship should be a title as proud as that of king, and whose danger is that you may degrade that citizenship." Because of their substantial numbers at the time, Native Americans would be able to overwhelm the power of the white vote in several states.

While the Civil Rights Act and Fourteenth Amendment served to prevent or limit citizenship for Native Americans, there were special considerations that granted citizenship to some individuals or groups, which in turn gave them the right to vote. For example, the 1868 Treaty of Fort Laramie created the possibility for the Lakota people to access the right to vote. Article 6 of the treaty stated that Natives could gain citizenship by "receiving a patent for land under the foregoing provisions ... and be entitled to all the privileges and immunities of such citizens, and shall, at the same time retain all [their] rights to benefits accruing to Indians under this treaty". The advantage of this was that the Natives could become citizens yet still maintain their status and rights as Natives.

Even for signatory Native Nations to the Fort Laramie Treaty, however, it was made clear that though some would become citizens, it did not mean that they all would gain the right to vote. In 1884, when John Elk, a Native who lived in Omaha, Nebraska, attempted to register in local elections, he was refused a ballot. When he took the case to Supreme Court and through the Elk v. Wilkins trial, he was ruled against under the circumstances that Natives were not protected under the Fourteenth Amendment. The Dawes Act in 1887 continued to pave the pathway for Native citizenship in that members of certain Native American tribes who accepted an allotment of land was considered a citizen. The goal was for Natives to, through assimilation, "adopt the habits of civilized life". This movement certainly convinced a lot of Natives to gain citizenship. This is seen through President Theodore Roosevelt's statement on the allotment policy in which he reported that by 1901, 60,000 Natives had already become citizens of the United States.

Piece by piece, more acts were created that added Natives to the citizenship rolls. When the Native Territory (what is now Oklahoma) was abolished in 1907, all Natives who lived in that territory were made citizens through the Oklahoma Enabling Act.

Furthermore, after World War I, any Native who had fought with honorable discharge was also considered a citizen through the Act of November 6, 1919. As Native Vote states, "The underlying assumption of this act was that these particular Indians had demonstrated that they had become part of the larger Anglo culture and were no longer wholly Indian".

By the early 1920s, Congress was considering a bill to make the remainder of Native Americans citizens in their aim to have them "adopt Anglo culture". This finally was stated with the Indian Citizenship Act which was created on June 2, 1924. This act showed progress in that Natives would not have to give up being a Native to be a citizen of the United States. This included being an enrolled member of a tribe, living on a federally recognized reservation, or practicing their culture. However, this did not create the right to vote automatically.

Many states still prevented Natives from voting, even though they were citizens of the United States. For example, the attorney general of Colorado in 1936 declared that Natives could not vote because they were not citizens of the state. Similarly, states found ways around voting in other ways. Because the Fifteenth Amendment 1870 barred states from limiting voting on account of race, states found other ways – residency: claiming that Native Americans were not residents of the state if they resided on reservations, self-termination: one must first abandon their tribal ties in order to vote, taxation: Natives who do not need to pay taxes cannot vote, guardianship: the claim that Native Americans were incompetent and "wards of the state", and on the lack of ability to read English.

With World War II and the need for more soldiers through the draft, Congress reaffirmed Native people's citizenship with the Nationality Act of 1940. However, when some 25,000 veterans returned home after the war, they realized that even though they had put their lives on the line for their country, they were still not allowed to vote.

In 1965 the Voting Rights Act (VRA) put an end to individual states' claims on whether or not Natives were allowed to vote through a federal law. Section 2 of the VRA states that, "No voting qualification or prerequisite to voting, or standard, practice, or procedure, shall be imposed or applied by any State or political subdivision to deny or abridge the right of any citizen of the United States to vote on account of race or color". Further sections describe the measures taken if violations to this act are discovered.

However, efforts by states and municipalities to disenfranchise Native Americans are ongoing, such that there have been about 74 cases brought by or on behalf of Natives under the VRA or the Fourteenth or Fifteenth Amendment since 1965. These in the most part have proved to be successful to upholding the rights of Native Americans as citizens of the United States. Most of these cases are centered on states that have large reservations, or Native populations, such as New Mexico, Arizona and Oklahoma.

== Land rights ==
One of the major issues surrounding land ownership rights of the Native American Nations is the purposes for which they are and are not allowed to use their land.

A typical example of the struggle faced involved the Seneca Nation of New York State. On April 18, 2007, the Seneca Nation laid claim to a stretch of Interstate 90 that crosses the Cattaraugus Reservation by revoking the 1954 agreement that granted the Interstate Highway System and New York State Thruway Authority permission to build the highway through the territory. The move was a direct shot at New York Governor Eliot Spitzer's attempts to collect taxes on Seneca territory. The Senecas had previously made the same claim in a lawsuit which they lost because of the state's assertion of sovereign immunity. In Magistrate Heckman's Report and Recommendation it was noted that the State of New York asserted its immunity from a suit against both counts of the complaint (one count was the challenge regarding the state's acquisition of Grand Island and other smaller islands in the Niagara River and another count challenging the thruway easement). The United States was permitted to intervene on behalf of the Seneca Nation and the Tonawanda Band of Seneca Indians. The United States was then directed to file an amended complaint that "clearly states the relief sought by the United States in this action". In this amended complaint the United States did not seek any relief on behalf of the Seneca Nation relative to the thruway easement. By not seeking such relief in its amended complaint the United States of America permitted the action relative to the thruway easement to be subject to dismissal based on New York's immunity from suit under the Eleventh Amendment to the United States Constitution. On May 4, the Seneca Nation threatened to do the same with Interstate 86.

== See also ==
- Indian arts and crafts laws
- Indian child welfare laws
- Native American Rights Fund
- Native American reservation politics
- Outline of United States federal Indian law and policy
- Racism against Native Americans in the United States
- Redwashing
- List of Native American and First Nations law resources
