= Lists of U.S. cities with non-white majority populations =

The following are links to lists of United States cities in which a majority of the population is not white organized by majority racial group. The US census officially recognizes six racial categories: White American, Black or African American, Native American and Alaska Native, Asian American, Native Hawaiian and Other Pacific Islander, and people of two or more races. It should not, however, be inferred that every city not on one of the lists below has a white majority. (There are many cities in the United States in which no racial group is in the majority.)

- List of U.S. communities with African-American majority populations — over 50% African-American cities ranked by percentage within state
- List of U.S. cities with large African-American populations — over 30% African-American cities ranked by percentage nationwide
- List of U.S. counties with African-American majority populations
- List of U.S. communities with Asian-American majority populations
- List of U.S. communities with Native American majority populations
- List of U.S. counties with Native American majority populations

== See also ==
- Places in the United States with notable demographic characteristics
- Births of U.S. states and territories by race/ethnicity
- Demography of the United States
