= Anne Helen Petersen =

American writer and journalist

- Born: 1981 (age 44–45)
- Education: Whitman College (BA); University of Oregon (MA); University of Texas at Austin (PhD)
- Occupations: Writer, journalist, culture critic
- Employer: BuzzFeed News

Anne Helen Petersen is an American writer and journalist. She worked as a Senior Culture Writer for BuzzFeed until August 2020, when she began writing full-time for her newsletter "Culture Study." Petersen has also been published in the opinion section of The New York Times. She is also the writer, host, and producer of the Culture Study blog and podcast.

== Early life and education ==
A native of Lewiston, Idaho, Petersen first graduated from Whitman College in 2003 with a BA in Rhetoric and Film Studies. She then completed an MA in English from the University of Oregon in 2007, and a PhD in media studies in 2011 from the University of Texas at Austin, where she studied the history of the gossip industry.

== Career ==
While a visiting professor at Whitman College, Petersen began writing about popular culture topics for online news and entertainment sites (including the Scandals of Classic Hollywood series at the Hairpin) and found that she enjoyed non-academic writing. In May 2014 she moved to New York to write for BuzzFeed News.

In 2014, she published her first piece for BuzzFeed, "Jennifer Lawrence and the History of Cool Girls." She also authored her first book, the non-fiction Scandals of Classic Hollywood, based on her Hairpin series. Informed by her scholarship, she continued to write about celebrities throughout her time at BuzzFeed and BuzzFeed News, including Adam Driver, Keira Knightley, Taylor Kitsch, Charlize Theron, Justin Timberlake, Kate Hudson, Margot Robbie, Jennifer Aniston, and Kim Kardashian.

In 2017, she published Too Fat, Too Slutty, Too Loud: The Rise and Reign of the Unruly Woman, which argued that unruly women had become hypervisible in the "American imagination." The book highlights examples of women that had become very well-known and financially successful while frequently being accused of having too much of some quality—for example, being seen as too fat or too loud.

The same year, Petersen wrote a piece about actor Armie Hammer, "Ten Long Years of Trying to Make Armie Hammer Happen", analyzing Hammer's star image from 2007 to 2017. The article became controversial and provoked criticism and backlash from Hammer, film industry figures, and other journalists. Subsequently, Petersen received online harassment.

Her work at BuzzFeed was not limited to celebrities. She reported on the COVID-19 pandemic, student loans, Native Americans voting in elections, expanding Medicaid, refugee resettlement, religion, the Harvey Weinstein sexual abuse cases, and bachelorette parties. Being a native of Lewiston, Idaho, she was credited with being able to bring a Western small town and rural perspective to a national audience, on issues such as Antifa, gun politics, 2017 Montana's at-large congressional district special election's relation with national politics, and the COVID-19 anti-lockdown protests in the United States.

In 2019, Petersen wrote a piece on millennial burnout for BuzzFeed News that has had over 7 million views. She then expanded that piece into a book that was published in 2020, Can't Even: How Millennials Became the Burnout Generation.

In August 2020, she quit her job at Buzzfeed News to pursue her newsletter Culture Study as a full-time venture. Along with her partner Charlie Warzel, she wrote the book Out of Office: The Big Problem and Bigger Promise of Working from Home, published in December 2021. A 2024 Forbes profile described Petersen as "the voice of a micro-generation," those born between 1977-1985. The piece reported that Culture Study is "one of Substack’s top newsletters," with 184,000 subscribers. In October 2025, Petersen left Substack for Patreon.

From October 2022 to October 2023, Petersen hosted the Work Appropriate podcast on the Crooked Media podcast network. She launched a podcast and accompanying blog, Culture Study, in December 2023.

== Personal life ==
Petersen lives on Lummi Island, Washington with her partner Charlie Warzel, a former New York Times Opinion writer who now writes the newsletter "Galaxy Brain" for The Atlantic. The couple have two dogs named Steve and Beverly and previously lived in Brooklyn and Missoula, Montana. She is of Norwegian descent. Her younger brother, Charles Petersen, is a senior editor of the magazine n+1.

== Works ==
- Petersen, Anne Helen (2014). Scandals of Classic Hollywood. New York: Plume.
- Petersen, Anne Helen (2017). Too Fat, Too Slutty, Too Loud. New York: Plume. ISBN 978-0-399-57685-0.
- Petersen, Anne Helen (2020). Can't Even. New York: Houghton Mifflin Harcourt.
- Warzel, Charlie; Petersen, Anne Helen (2021). Out of Office. New York: Knopf.
