= Places in the United States with notable demographic characteristics =

The following is a collection of data for places with unusual or otherwise notable demographic characteristics within the United States. The data was obtained by the U.S. Census Bureau.

== Of any population ==
Note: Data for places with extremely small populations may be misleading or anomalous.

=== Tenure ===
- Most populous place where the entire population owns their housing units. Fort Devens, Massachusetts. Population: 1,017.
- Most populous place where the entire population rents their housing units. K. I. Sawyer AFB, Michigan. Population: 1,443.

=== Income and housing costs ===
- Highest per capita income and median housing cost below $100,000. Naples, South Dakota. Per capita income: $78,450; median housing cost: $36,300; population: 25.
- Highest per capita income and median housing cost below $200,000. Rex, North Carolina. Per capita income: $148,073; median housing cost: $137,500; population: 55.
- Highest median household income and median housing cost below $100,000. Valley Park, Oklahoma. Median household income: $101,376; median housing cost: $27,500; population: 24.
- Highest median household income and median housing cost below $200,000. Rex, North Carolina. Median household income: above $200,000; median housing cost: $137,500; population: 55.
- Lowest per capita income and median housing cost in excess of $1,000,000. Kirkwood, California. Per capita income: $14,853; population: 96.
- Lowest median household income and median housing cost in excess of $1,000,000. Mountain Village, Colorado. Median household income: $30,663; population: 978.

=== Income and race ===
- Highest median household income and an entirely European American population. The following places had an entirely European American population and a median household income above $200,000:

- Mound, Louisiana. Population: 12.
- Orchid, Florida. Population: 140.

- Highest median household income and a proportion of African Americans in excess of 50 percent. Woodmore, Maryland. Percent African American: 64.9%; median household income: $97,270; population: 6,077.
- Highest median household income and a proportion of Asian Americans in excess of 50 percent. Milpitas, California. Percent Asian: 51.8%; median household income: $84,429; population: 62,698.
- Highest median household income and a proportion of Native Hawaiians or other Pacific Islanders in excess of 20 percent. Waimanalo Beach, Hawaii. Percent Native Hawaiian or other Pacific Islander: 47.3%; median household income: $55,781; population: 4,271.
- Highest median household income and a proportion of Native Americans in excess of 50 percent. Lotsee, Oklahoma. Percent Native American: 72.7%; median household income: $152,338; population: 11.

=== Race ===
- Highest percentage of African Americans. All inhabitants are African American in the following places:

- McMullen, Alabama. Population: 66.
- Birdsong, Arkansas. Population: 40.

- Highest percentage of Asians. Kaumakani, Hawaii. Percent Asian: 76.1; population: 607.
- Highest percentage of Native Hawaiians or other Pacific Islanders. Anahola, Hawaii. Percent Native Hawaiian or other Pacific Islander: 47.8%; population: 1,932.
- Highest percentage of Native Americans. All inhabitants are Native Americans in the following places:

- Birch Creek, Alaska. Population: 28.
- New Allakaket, Alaska. Population: 36.
- Pinehill, New Mexico. Population: 116.
- Winslow West, Arizona. Population: 131.
- Spring Creek, South Dakota. Population: 136.
- La Plant, South Dakota. Population: 150.

== Population in excess of 10,000 ==
=== Income and housing costs ===
- Highest per capita income and median housing cost below $100,000. Greater Sun Center, Florida. Per capita income: $28,222; median housing cost: $93,100; population: 16,321.
- Highest median household income and median housing cost below $100,000. The Colony, Texas. Median household income: $64,080; median housing cost: $26,661; population: 26,531.
- Lowest median household income and median housing cost in excess of $1,000,000. Beverly Hills, California. Median household income: $70,945; population: 33,784.

=== Race ===
- Highest percentage of African Americans: East St. Louis, Illinois. Percent African American: 97.7; population: 31,542.
- Highest percentage of Asians: Waipahu, Hawaii. Percent Asian: 65.4; population: 33,108.
- Highest percentage of Whites: Kiryas Joel, New York. Percent White: 99.8; population: 13,138.
- Highest percentage of Hispanics or Latinos: San Benito, Texas. Percent Hispanic or Latino: 88.9; population: 25,500.

== Population in excess of 50,000 ==
=== Income ===
- Highest median household income. Cupertino, California. Median household income: $100,411; population: 50,546.
- Highest per capita income and median housing cost below $100,000. Huntsville, Alabama. Per capita income: $24,015; median housing cost: $97,300; population: 158,216.
- Highest median household income and median housing cost below $100,000. Broken Arrow, Oklahoma. Median household income: $53,507; median housing cost: $99,000; population: 74,859.

=== Race ===
- Highest percentage of African Americans: Gary, Indiana. Percent African American: 84.0; population: 102,746.
- Highest percentage of Asians: Monterey Park, California. Percent Asian: 61.8; population: 60,051.
- Highest percentage of Whites: Mentor, Ohio. Percent White: 97.3; population: 50,278.
- Highest percentage of Hispanics or Latinos: Harlingen, Texas. Percent Hispanic or Latino: 85.5; population: 51,500.

=== Income and race ===
- Only large county where the median household income of African American households exceeds that of white households. Queens, New York City. Percent African American: 20%; median household income among blacks; $51,836. Percent white: 44%; median household income among whites; $50,960.

== Population in excess of 200,000 ==
- Highest median household income. Plano, Texas. Median household income: $78,722; population: 222,030.

=== Race ===
- Highest percentage of African Americans: Detroit, Michigan. Percent African American: 81.6; population: 951,270.
- Highest percentage of Asians: Honolulu, Hawaii. Percent Asian: 55.8; population: 371,657.
- Highest percentage of Whites: Scottsdale, Arizona. Percent White: 92.1; population: 202,705.
- Highest percentage of Hispanics or Latinos: Laredo, Texas. Percent Hispanic or Latino: 95.6; population: 236,091. (2010)

== See also ==
- Demographics of the United States
