= Federal Law for the Protection of Cultural Heritage of Indigenous and Afro-Mexican Peoples and Communities =

LXV Legislature of the Mexican Congress
- Long title: Ley Federal de Protección del Patrimonio Cultural de los Pueblos y Comunidades Indígenas y Afromexicanas
- Citation: DOF 17-01-2022
- Signed by: Andrés Manuel López Obrador
- Effective: 17 January 2022
- Status: In force

The Federal Law for the Protection of Cultural Heritage of Indigenous and Afro-Mexican Peoples and Communities (Spanish: Ley Federal de Protección del Patrimonio Cultural de los Pueblos y Comunidades Indígenas y Afromexicanas) is a federal law in Mexico which protects the cultural heritage of Indigenous Mexicans and Afro-Mexicans and aims to curtail appropriation of Afro-Mexican and Indigenous cultures. The law was enacted on January 17, 2022.

== History ==
Since the law has been enacted, Indigenous artisans in Mexico have brought complaints against corporations for appropriating traditional Indigenous designs. In 2022, Indigenous Oaxacan artists, including Mixtec artists, accused the US corporations J. Marie Collections and Tuckernuck of appropriating traditional Oaxacan huipil designs.

== See also ==
- Cultural appropriation
- Indian arts and crafts laws
  - Cherokee Nation Truth in Advertising for Native Art
  - Indian Arts and Crafts Act of 1990
- Indigenous intellectual property
- Pretendian
- Visual arts of the Indigenous peoples of the Americas
