= Cherokee Nation Truth in Advertising for Native Art =

Native American tribal law

Council of the Cherokee Nation
- Long title: A Legislative Act Requiring Truth in Advertising for Native Art
- Citation: Legislative Act 01-08
- Territorial extent: Cherokee Nation and Cherokee Nation entities
- Enacted by: Council of the Cherokee Nation
- Enacted: January 21, 2008

Legislative history
- Introduced by: Cara Cowan Watts
- Introduced: November 29, 2007
- Status: In force

The Cherokee Nation Truth in Advertising for Native Art is a legislative act unanimously passed by the Council of the Cherokee Nation on January 14, 2008, and signed into law a week later on January 21, 2008. A truth-in-advertising law, the act requires vendors who market themselves as American Indians on Cherokee Nation property to provide proof of citizenship in a federally recognized American Indian tribe or face expulsion.

== About ==
The act is stricter than the criteria set by the Indian Arts and Crafts Act of 1990, which stipulates that Native American artisans must be members of a federally recognized tribes, certain state-recognized tribes, or tribally designated artisans. The law follows the State of Oklahoma's American Indian Arts and Crafts Sales Act of 1974, which states: "'American Indian' means a person who is a citizen or is an enrolled member of an American Indian tribe" and "'American Indian tribe' means any Indian tribe federally recognized by the Bureau of Indian Affairs of the United States Department of the Interior."

The Cherokee Nation's act requires membership in a federally recognized tribe. According to Cherokee Nation Principal Chief Chuck Hoskin Jr., the Indian Arts and Crafts Act fails to adequately protect Native American artisans, stating that "Unfortunately, the Indian Arts and Crafts Act — a law intended to protect Native artists — helps these “tribes” in their quest for legitimacy. Under the law, artists with membership in these fraudulent organizations compete alongside Cherokee citizens in selling art under the federally protected “Indian art” label."

The Cherokee Nation is one of four federally recognized American Indian tribes to reference the Indian Arts and Crafts Act in their law codes. The Cherokee Nation's truth-in-advertising law is complemented by its Arts and Crafts Copyright Act.

== History ==
In September, 2008, the editors of Indianz.com stated that the Cherokee Nation's "Truth in Advertising for Native Art Act was necessary to protect artists who are Cherokee citizens from the proliferation of fraudulent Cherokee groups and individuals proclaiming themselves Cherokee to profit off the growing “Indian art” market." The statement was a response to letters to the editor claiming that the act was part of "personal attacks" against individuals who self-identify as Cherokee.

The First American Art Magazine has stated the magazine "complies with the 2008 Cherokee Nation Truth in Advertising for Native Art Act (#07-160) and is explicit in revealing if individuals are enrolled in the three federally recognized Cherokee tribes or if they are unenrolled individuals of Cherokee descent." The magazine further states that "No living person should be listed simply as Cherokee, but instead, their affiliation or lack of affiliation should be spelled out."

== See also ==
- Cherokee descent
- Federal Law for the Protection of Cultural Heritage of Indigenous and Afro-Mexican Peoples and Communities
- Indian Arts and Crafts Act of 1990
- Indian arts and crafts laws
- Intellectual property rights
- Pretendian
