= Title 25 of the Code of Federal Regulations =

US statutes concerning Native Americans

Title 25 is the portion of the Code of Federal Regulations that governs Government-to-Government relations with Native American tribes within the United States. It is available in digital or printed form.

Volume	Chapter	Sections	Scope
1	I	1–299	Bureau of Indian Affairs (Department of the Interior) Subchapter A—Procedures and Practice Subchapter B—Law and Order Subchapter C—Probate Subchapter D—Human Services Subchapter E—Education Subchapter F—Tribal Government Subchapter G—Financial Activities Subchapter H—Land and Water Subchapter I—Energy and Minerals Subchapter J—Fish and Wildlife Subchapter K—Housing Subchapter L—Heritage Preservation Subchapter M—Indian Self-determination and Education Assistance Act Program Subchapter N—Economic Enterprises Subchapter O—Miscellaneous
2	II	300–399	Indian Arts and Crafts Board (Department of the Interior)
2	III	500–599	National Indian Gaming Commission (Department of the Interior) Subchapter A—General Provisions Subchapter B—Approval of Class II and Class III Ordinances and Resolutions Subchapter C—Management Contract Provisions Subchapter D—Human Services Subchapter E—Gaming Licenses and Background Investigations for Key Employees and Primary Management Officials Subchapter F—[reserved] Subchapter G—Compliance and Enforcement Provisions Subchapter H—[reserved] Subchapter I—[reserved]
2	IV	700–799	The Office of Navajo and Hopi Indian Relocation
2	V	900	Bureau of Indian Affairs (Department of the Interior) and Indian Health Service (Department of Health and Human Services)
2	VI	1000–1099	Office of the Assistant Secretary, Indian Affairs (Department of the Interior)
2	VII	1200–1299	Office of the Special Trustee for American Indians (Department of the Interior)
