= List of U.S. counties with Native American majority populations =

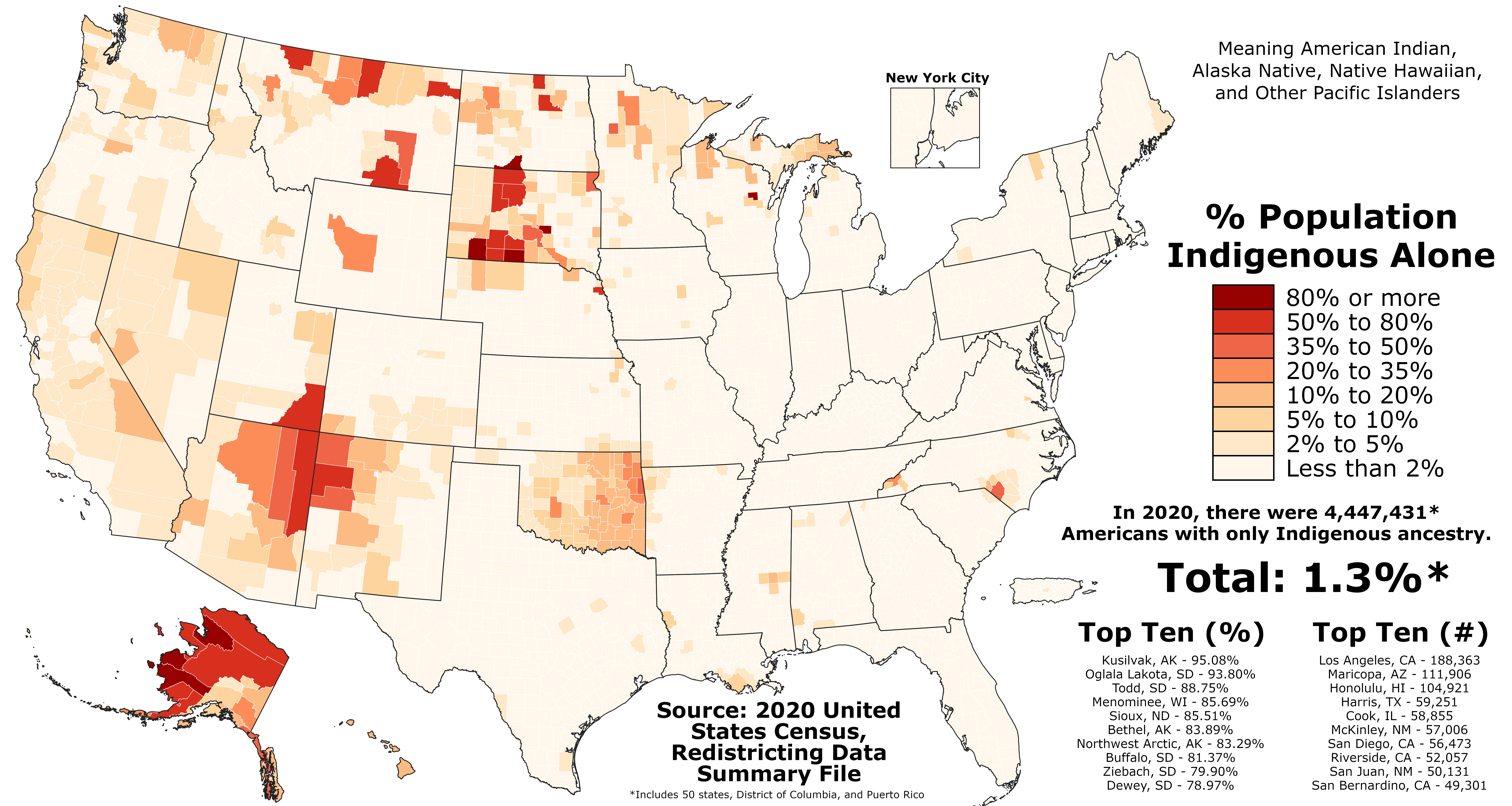
Distribution of Native Americans by county

The following is a list of United States counties in which a majority (over 50%) of the population is Native American (American Indian or Alaska Native), according to data from the 2020 Census. There are 33 counties in 11 states with Native American majority populations. County-equivalents, such as boroughs and census areas in Alaska, are included in this list.

This list does not include Pacific Islanders / Native Hawaiians; in any case, there are no counties with majorities. The highest percentage of Pacific Islanders in any U.S. county is Kalawao County, Hawaii, with 48%, although it only has 82 inhabitants.

== List ==
County	State	Total Population 2020 Census	Native American Alone population	Native American Mixed population	Native American Alone & Mixed population	Native American Alone & Mixed percent
Bethel Census Area	Alaska	18,666	15,632	884	16,516	88.5%
Dillingham Census Area	Alaska	4,857	3,453	429	3,882	79.9%
Kusilvak Census Area	Alaska	8,368	7,946	165	8,111	96.9%
Lake and Peninsula Borough	Alaska	1,476	994	139	1,133	76.8%
Nome Census Area	Alaska	10,046	7,556	739	8,295	82.6%
North Slope Borough	Alaska	11,031	5,748	624	6,372	57.8%
Northwest Arctic Borough	Alaska	7,793	6,469	399	6,868	88.1%
Prince of Wales-Hyder Census Area	Alaska	5,753	2,584	565	3,149	54.7%
Yakutat City and Borough	Alaska	662	255	92	347	52.4%
Yukon–Koyukuk Census Area	Alaska	5,343	3,832	294	4,126	77.2%
Apache County	Arizona	66,021	47,016	1,162	48,178	73.0%
Mahnomen County	Minnesota	5,411	2,324	686	3,010	55.6%
Big Horn County	Montana	13,124	8,794	486	9,280	70.7%
Blaine County	Montana	7,044	3,718	214	3,932	55.8%
Glacier County	Montana	13,778	9,253	765	10,018	72.7%
Roosevelt County	Montana	10,794	6,246	655	6,901	63.9%
Thurston County	Nebraska	6,773	3,980	115	4,095	60.5%
McKinley County	New Mexico	72,902	56,941	1,904	58,845	80.7%
Benson County	North Dakota	5,964	3,216	131	3,347	56.1%
Rolette County	North Dakota	12,187	9,278	457	9,735	79.9%
Sioux County	North Dakota	3,898	3,332	152	3,484	89.4%
Adair County	Oklahoma	19,495	8,570	2,355	10,925	56.0%
Bennett County	South Dakota	3,381	2,093	238	2,331	68.9%
Buffalo County	South Dakota	1,948	1,585	66	1,651	84.8%
Corson County	South Dakota	3,902	2,734	149	2,883	73.9%
Dewey County	South Dakota	5,239	4,136	195	4,331	82.7%
Mellette County	South Dakota	1,918	1,112	115	1,227	64.0%
Jackson County	South Dakota	2,806	1,548	156	1,704	60.7%
Oglala Lakota County	South Dakota	13,672	12,822	250	13,072	95.6%
Todd County	South Dakota	9,319	8,269	236	8,505	91.3%
Ziebach County	South Dakota	2,413	1,925	66	1,991	82.5%
San Juan County	Utah	14,518	7,278	305	7,583	52.2%
Menominee County	Wisconsin	4,255	3,643	83	3,726	87.6%

== Counties with Native American plurality ==
County	State	Total Population 2020 Census	Native American Alone population	Native American Mixed population	Native American Alone & Mixed population	Native American Alone & Mixed percent
Navajo County	Arizona	106,717	47,442	2,575	50,017	46.9%
Cibola County	New Mexico	27,172	12,240	658	12,898	47.5%
San Juan County	New Mexico	121,661	50,021	3,877	53,898	44.3%
Robeson County	North Carolina	116,530	44,871	3,835	48,706	41.8%

== See also ==
- List of U.S. communities with Native American majority populations
- Lists of U.S. cities with non-white majority populations
