= Indian Arts and Crafts Act of 1990 =

US statute

- Long title: An Act to expand the powers of the Indian Arts and Crafts Board, and for other purposes.
- Acronyms (colloquial): IACA
- Enacted by: the 101st United States Congress
- Effective: November 29, 1990

Citations
- Public law: 101-644
- Statutes at Large: 104 Stat. 4662

Codification
- Titles amended: 18 U.S.C.: Crimes and Criminal Procedure; 25 U.S.C.: Indians
- U.S.C. sections amended: 18 U.S.C. ch. 53 § 1159; 25 U.S.C. ch. 7A § 305e

Legislative history
- Introduced in the House as H.R. 2006 by Jon Kyl (R–AZ) on April 17, 1989; Committee consideration by House Interior and Insular Affairs, House Judiciary, Senate Indian Affairs; Passed the House on September 27, 1990 (Passed voice vote); Passed the Senate on October 25, 1990 (Passed voice vote) with amendment; House agreed to Senate amendment on October 27, 1990 (Agreed without objection) with further amendment; Senate agreed to House amendment on October 28, 1990 (Agreed voice vote); Signed into law by President George H. W. Bush on November 29, 1990

The Indian Arts and Crafts Act of 1990 (P.L. 101-644) is a truth-in-advertising law which prohibits misrepresentation in marketing of American Indian or Alaska Native arts and crafts products within the United States. It is illegal to offer or display for sale or sell any art or craft product in a manner that falsely suggests it is Indian produced, an Indian product, or the product of a particular Indian or Indian Tribe or Indian arts and crafts organization, resident within the United States. For a first time violation of the Act, an individual can face civil or criminal penalties up to a $250,000 fine or a five-year prison term, or both. If a business violates the Act, it can face civil penalties or can be prosecuted and fined up to $1,000,000.

The law covers all Indian and Indian-style traditional and contemporary arts and crafts produced after 1935. The Act broadly applies to the marketing of arts and crafts by any person in the United States. Some traditional items frequently copied by non-Indians include Indian-style jewelry, pottery, baskets, carved stone fetishes, woven rugs, kachina figures, and clothing.

The Indian Arts and Crafts Board, an agency established in 1934, has responsibility for overseeing the implementation of the Act.

== Definitions ==
The US Department of the Interior explicitly states on its informational website about the Act that, "Under the Act, an Indian is defined as a member of any federally or State recognized Indian Tribe, or an individual certified as an Indian artisan by an Indian Tribe."

In Section 309.2, the Act defines an "Indian tribe" as:

(1) Any Indian tribe, band, nation, Alaska Native village, or any organized group or community which is recognized as eligible for the special programs and services provided by the United States to Indians because of their status as Indians; or (2) Any Indian group that has been formally recognized as an Indian tribe by a State legislature or by a State commission or similar organization legislatively vested with State tribal recognition authority.

All products must be marketed truthfully regarding the Indian heritage and tribal affiliation of the producers, so as not to mislead the consumer. It is illegal to market an art or craft item using the name of a tribe if a member, or certified Indian artisan, of that tribe did not actually create the art or craft item.

Section 309.4 of the act also allows for individuals with tribal ancestry who are not eligible for enrollment to be designated as "an Indian artisan by a particular tribe". The certification must be documented in writing by the tribal government.

The Act does not apply to services as was revealed by the judgement in a case against James Arthur Ray.

== Controversy ==
Cultural anthropologist and attorney Gail Sheffield and others claim that this law has had "the unintended consequence of sanctioning discrimination against Native Americans whose tribal affiliation was not officially recognized". Those who claim to be Native artists but are not enrolled in a tribe run the risk of fines or imprisonment if they continue to sell their art while claiming Native heritage.

== See also ==
- Certificate of Degree of Indian Blood
- Cherokee Nation Truth in Advertising for Native Art
- Cultural appropriation
- Federal Law for the Protection of Cultural Heritage of Indigenous and Afro-Mexican Peoples and Communities
- Indian arts and crafts laws
- Indigenous intellectual property
- List of Alaska Native tribal entities
- List of federally recognized tribes
- Pretendian
- State recognized tribes in the United States
- Native American flute
- Protected Geographical Status, a similar legal requirement of authenticity in the European Union
- Terroir
- Title 25 of the Code of Federal Regulations
