= Rex, North Carolina =

- CDP
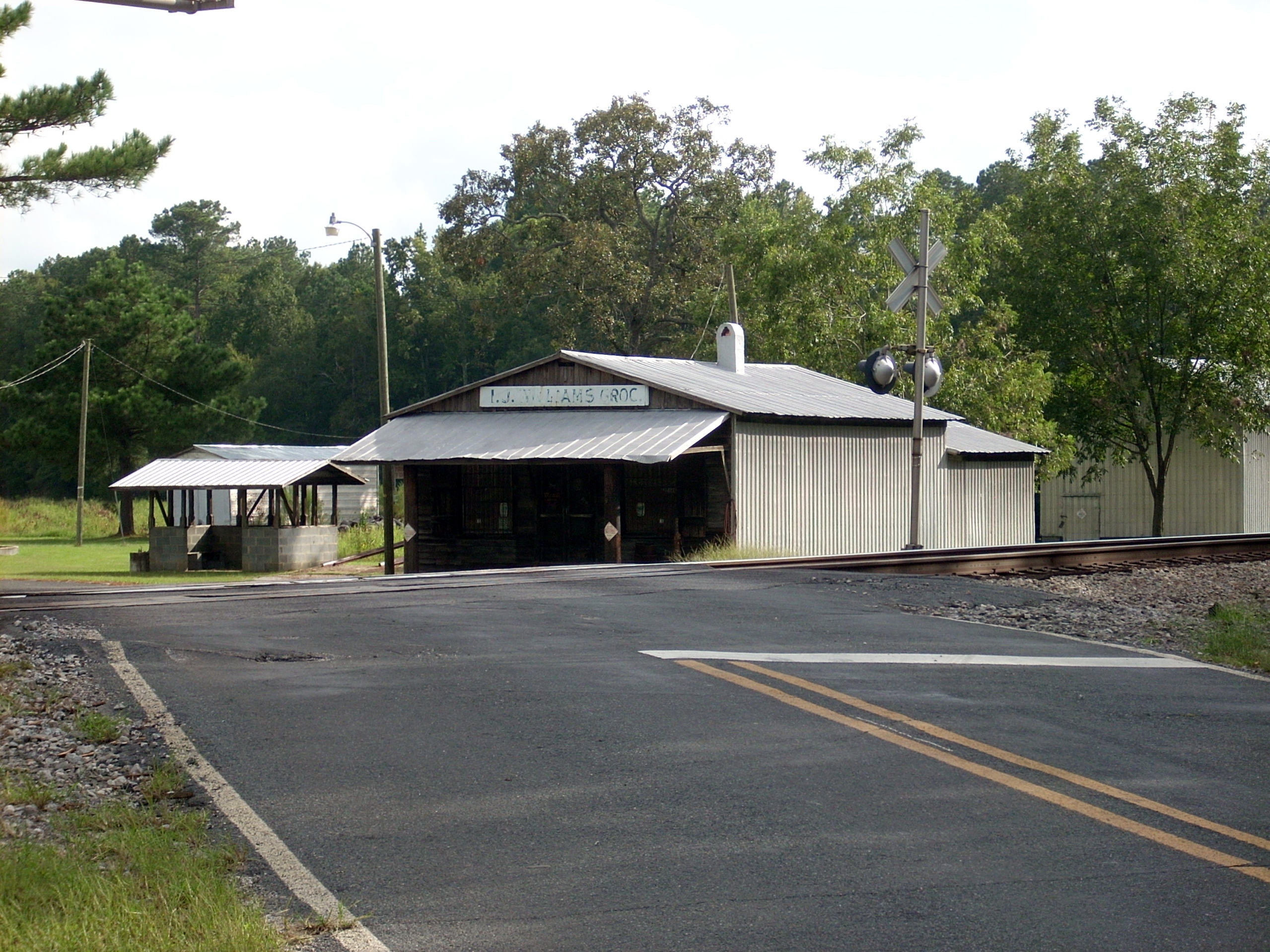
- I.J. Williams Grocery in Rex

- Location within the state of North Carolina
- Coordinates: 34°51′03″N 79°02′49″W
- Country: United States
- State: North Carolina
- County: Robeson

Area
  - Total: 0.74 sq mi (1.92 km^{2})
  - Land: 0.74 sq mi (1.92 km^{2})
  - Water: 0 sq mi (0.00 km^{2})
- Elevation: 184 ft (56 m)

Population (2020)
  - Total: 50
  - Density: 67.4/sq mi (26.01/km^{2})
- Time zone: UTC-5 (Eastern (EST))
  - Summer (DST): UTC-4 (EDT)
- ZIP code: 28378
- Area codes: 910, 472
- FIPS code: 37-56100
- GNIS feature ID: 2403472

Rex is a census-designated place (CDP) in Robeson County, North Carolina, United States. As of the 2020 census, Rex had a population of 50. It ranked fourth on the list of the highest-income places in the United States.

== Geography ==
According to the United States Census Bureau, the CDP has a total area of 0.7 square miles (1.8 km^{2}), all land.

== Demographics ==
Historical population
| Census | Pop. | Note | %± |
|---|---|---|---|
| 2020 | 50 | | — |
U.S. Decennial Census

As of the census of 2010, there were 55 people, 17 households, and 13 families residing in the CDP. The population density was 74.7 inhabitants per square mile (28.8/km^{2}). There were 17 housing units at an average density of 23.1/sq mi (8.9/km^{2}). The racial makeup of the CDP was 47.27% White, 40.00% African American, 9.09% Native American, and 3.64% from two or more races.

There were 17 households, out of which 52.9% had children under the age of 18 living with them, 52.9% were married couples living together, 17.6% had a female householder with no husband present, and 23.5% were non-families. 5.9% of all households were made up of individuals, and 5.9% had someone living alone who was 65 years of age or older. The average household size was 3.24 and the average family size was 3.69.

In the CDP, the population was spread out, with 30.9% under the age of 18, 14.5% from 18 to 24, 29.1% from 25 to 44, 12.7% from 45 to 64, and 12.7% who were 65 years of age or older. The median age was 34 years. For every 100 females, there were 89.7 males. For every 100 females age 18 and over, there were 81.0 males.

== Commerce ==
There are currently no mercantile operations in Rex. The primary industry is farming and farming related industries. Rex has two CSX railroad crossings as well as its own U.S. Post Office Branch. Some of the longtime commercial businesses in Rex were: H.P. Johnson - General Merchandise, R.N. Johnson Grocery, and I.J. Williams Grocery.

== Religion ==
There are three churches in the immediate Rex, NC vicinity: Rex Presbyterian Church, Mount Olive Presbyterian Church, and New Bethel Missionary Baptist Church. All of the churches serving this area are over 100 years old.
