= Native Americans in United States elections =

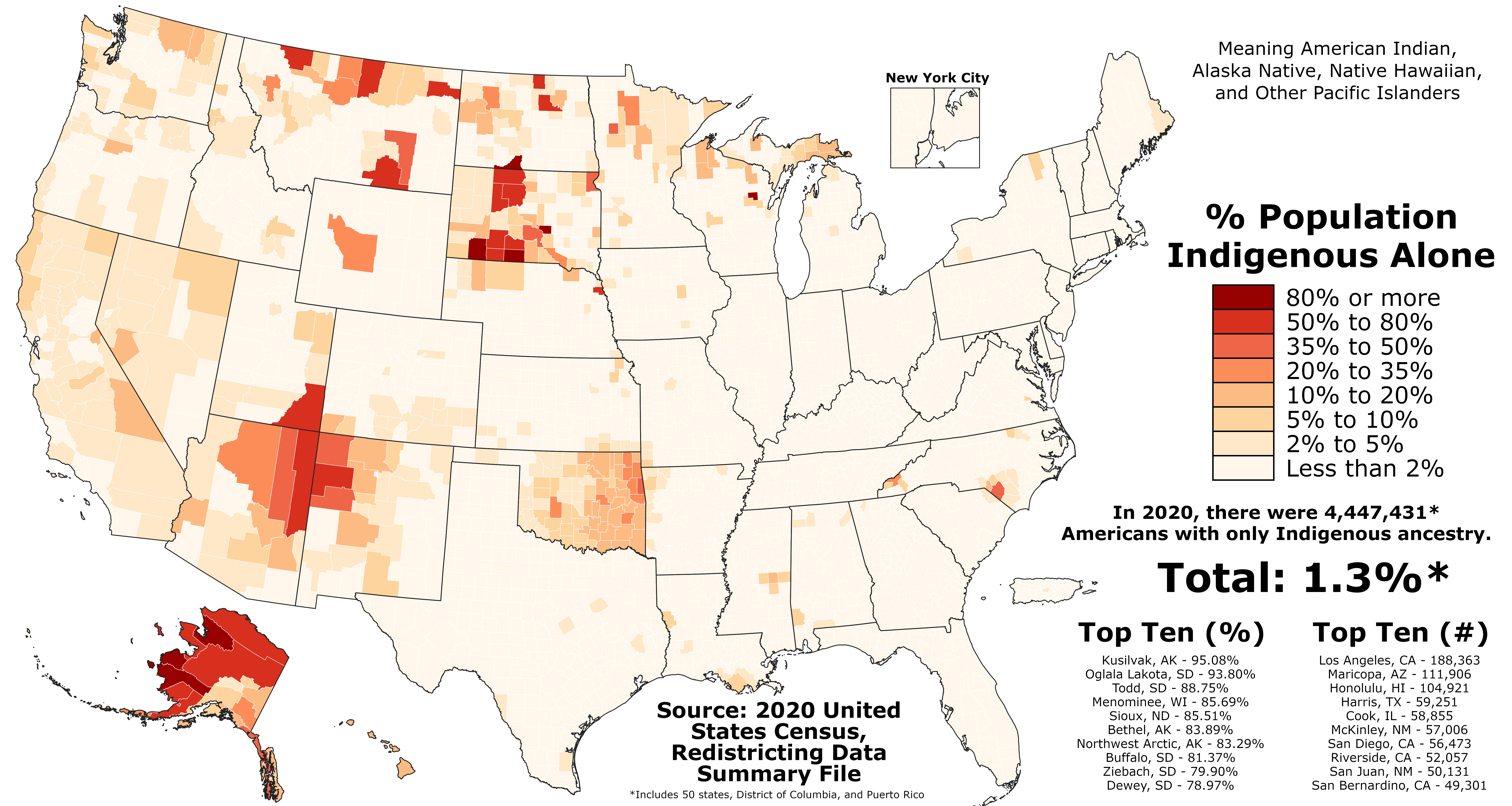
Proportion of Indigenous Americans in each county of the fifty states, the District of Columbia, and Puerto Rico as of the 2020 United States Census

Native Americans in the United States have had a unique history in their ability to vote and participate in United States elections and politics. Native Americans have been allowed to vote in United States elections since the passage of the Indian Citizenship Act in 1924, but were historically barred in different states from doing so. After a long history of fighting against voting rights restrictions, Native Americans now play an increasingly integral part in United States elections. They have been included in more recent efforts by political campaigns to increase voter turnout. Such efforts have borne more notable fruit since the 2020 U.S. presidential election, when Native American turnout was attributed to the historic flipping of the state of Arizona, which had not voted for the Democratic Party since the 1996 U.S. presidential election.

Despite this increase, in general, voter turnout remains low among Native Americans, as does overall trust in American political institutions. They are usually more likely to vote in tribal elections and to trust their officials.

== History of Native American suffrage ==
=== Voter suppression ===
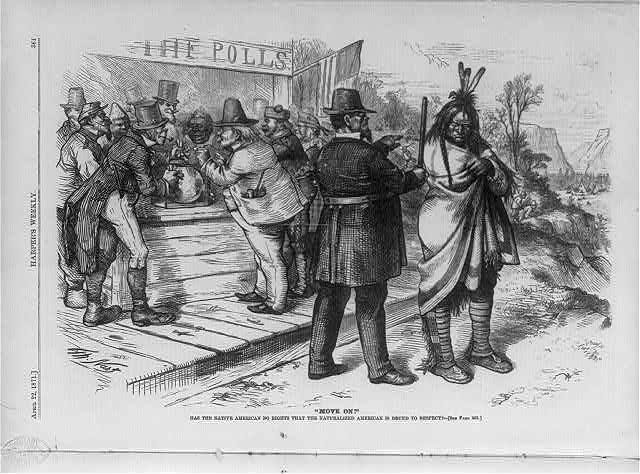
Picture created by Thomas Nast illustrating voter suppression towards Native Americans in the 19th century

It was not until 1924, when Native Americans were given citizenship, that they were able to vote. However, even as citizens some states still found ways to deny them the right to vote. One example is when the Arizona Supreme Court denied citizenship and suffrage to Native Americans living on reservations, arguing that they were under federal not state jurisdiction. Other tactics states used included the argument that Native Americans living on reservations should not have an influence in making state and local laws since they are not subject to their laws. In New Mexico, before 1948, Natives that did not have to pay state taxes were prevented from voting. Moreover, up until 1962 New Mexico continued suppressing indigenous voting rights on the basis that Native Americans living on reservations were not residents of the state. The same argument was used in Utah in 1956 to deny Indians the right to vote. The Utah Supreme Court ruled that Indians were incapable of being good citizens because of their illiteracy and separation from American society. Other states refused to recognize Indians as citizens unless they assimilated and abandoned all tribal connections.

From the early history of the Dakota settlement, suffrage was largely restricted to include only free white males. After the passage of the Snyder Act, the state of South Dakota denied voting rights and the right to hold office to Native Americans up to 1940. Practices to prevent Natives from voting included denying citizenship and blocking them from polling places. Some counties in the state continued these restrictive policies until as late as 1970. A court decision from 2006 also failed to recognize Native American citizenship.

=== Legislation ===
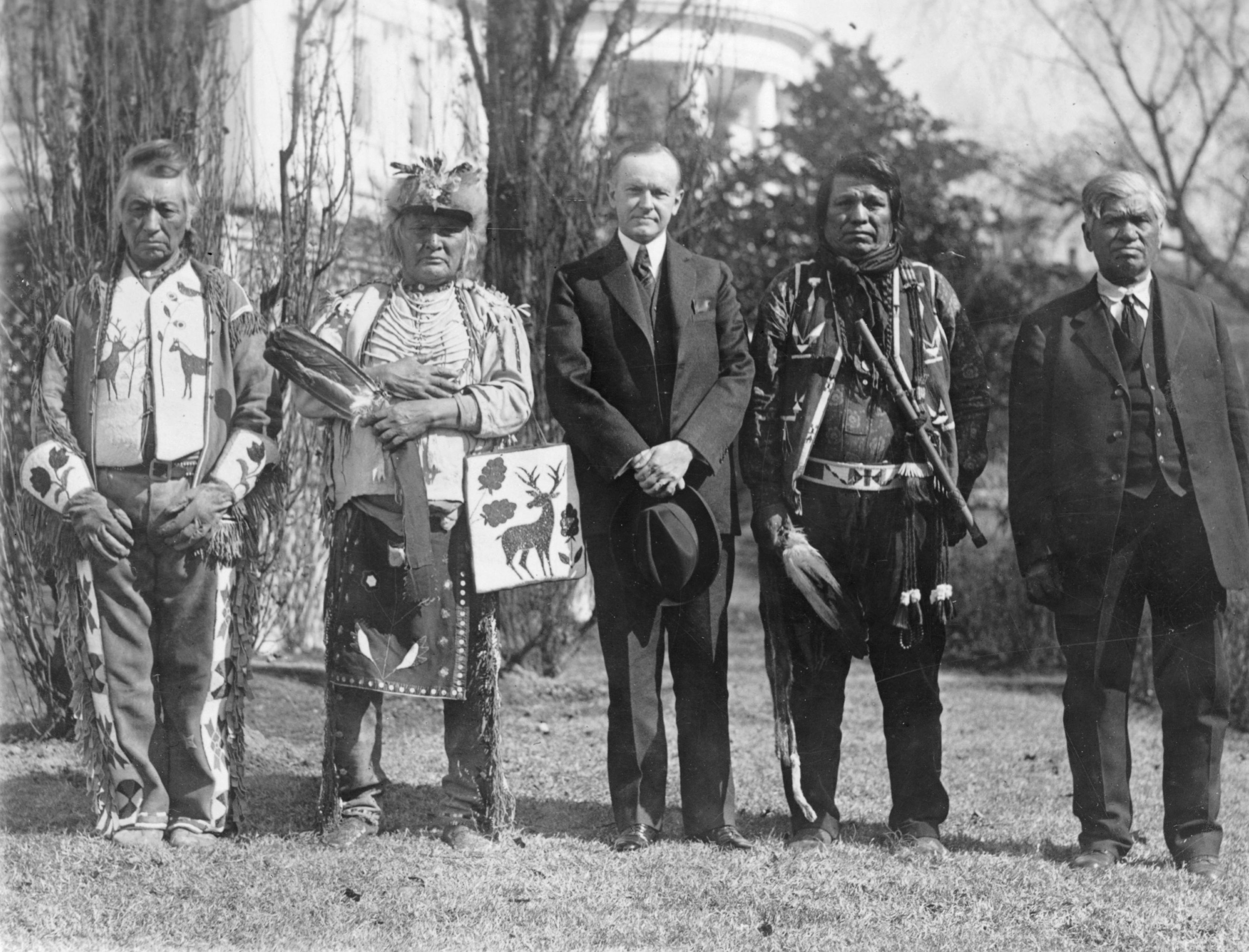
President Coolidge stands with four Osage Indians at the White House

There have been many laws passed to guarantee the voting rights of Native Americans. One of the first instances of these protections can be found in the Dawes Act, passed in 1885. The majority of the provisions of this law, however, aimed to assimilate Native American people into Western culture. This act also resulted in a huge loss of native lands. Many Natives were still denied citizenship until the Indian Citizenship Act was passed in 1924. Many individual states still denied suffrage to Native Americans because, they argued, they lived on federal lands, did not pay real estate tax, and participated in tribal elections, among other reasons. The 1965 Voting Rights Act ensured suffrage for all Native Americans, although some Native Americans still experienced opposition at the hands of state governments from practicing their newly granted right to vote. In 1975, amendments were passed to the Voting Rights Act, such as Section 203, that pushed to distribute election materials such as ballots in minority languages, including those Native American languages. This was also weakly enforced by the state of South Dakota, until recently.

=== Legal battles ===
The issue of US citizenship among Native Americans resulted in many legal battles. In 1884, Elk v. Wilkins reached the US Supreme Court, which questioned whether or not Native Americans could be granted US citizenship while still maintaining their tribal citizenship. The Supreme Court ruled in favor of granting dual citizenship to natives. Although the Dawes Act, and especially the Snyder Act, ensured citizenship for all Native Americans, states still pushed to deny Native Americans the right to vote. A 1928 Arizona state court ruling, Porter v. Hall, claimed Native Americans were not competent enough to vote. Many other states followed this ruling and denied suffrage to Native Americans.

=== Role of women ===
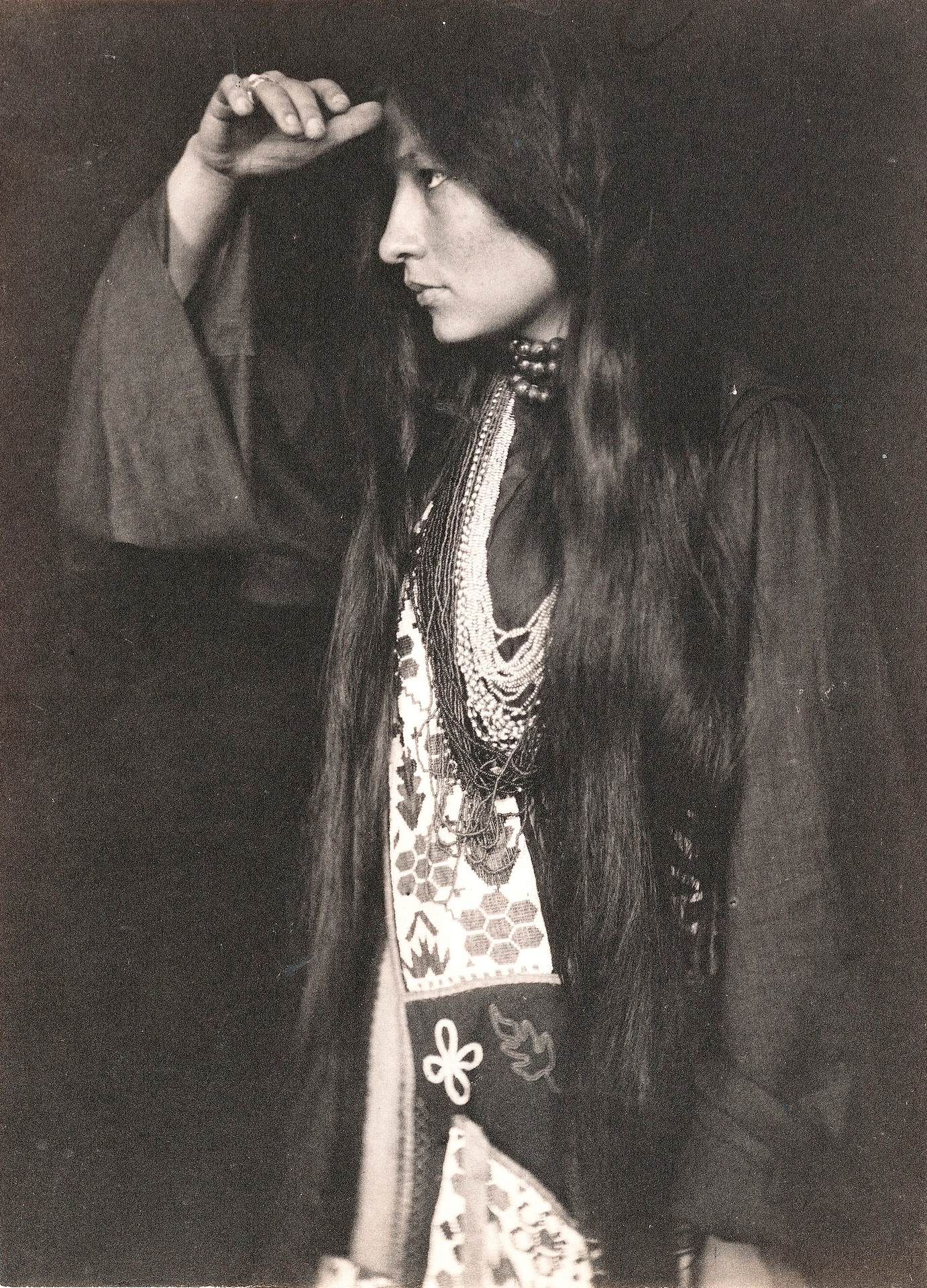
Zitkála-Šá, a Native American suffragist

As early as the general women's suffrage movement of the late 19th century and early 20th century, Native American women have played a role in the push for women to play a more active role in politics. As early as the 1810s, groups of Cherokee women, for instance, were seen advocating for equal rights to share with white women. After the 1920s, which saw the passage of the 19th amendment (guaranteeing women's suffrage) and the Snyder Act, activism for including Native female voices continued. As early as the 1930s, Native tribes such as the Ho-Chunk were including full suffrage for their women.

Today, Native women are shown to generally play a more active role in politics than their male counterparts. Surveys and polls alike show that Native women demonstrate a greater sense of civic duty. Such determination has led women to be essentially at the forefront of efforts to increase turnout among Natives. Despite all of this, Native women still play a minimal role in positions of government. Much of this is attributed to a resource gap along gender lines.

== Voter turnout among Native Americans ==
=== Economic factors ===
It has been found that, largely, economic factors have an impact on voter turnout. A study showed that within Native American families' voter turnout was increased by 6% for every $3,000 increase in the family's income. It also showed that education had an impact on Natives' likelihood to vote with a 13% increase for every year of schooling. However, despite the positive increases, Native American voting turnout is still less than "non-Indians".

=== In comparison to tribal elections ===
Scholars note that there is a significant difference in voter turnout between United States and tribal elections. The violent history between the United States and Native Americans has been noted as one of the factors for this inconsistency. Because of this history, Native Americans feel a greater sense of trust towards their respective tribes than to the United States. Many Native Americans believe their rights are more likely to be protected by their own tribe than by the US government.

=== Efforts to increase turnout ===
Voter turnout for all minority groups, including Native Americans, is much lower than the majority white population in the United States. One study showed that Native Americans were 51% less likely to vote than any other race. Other factors that affected Native American voter turnout were family income and education. Voter turnout began to increase as Native Americans enjoyed more sovereignty and cultural identity.

Tactics to increase voter turnout have been very diverse. One direct effort to increase voter turnout was campaigning through radio, as Native Americans are some of the most prevalent users of the radio. Once efforts were made to campaign via radio, political participation increased. Cumulative voting was another effort made to help minorities such as Native Americans increase turnout. In one study conducted among members of the Sisseton-Wahpeton Sioux tribe in South Dakota, cumulative voting was found to have increased voter turnout among tribal members. A majority of the members enjoyed using the cumulative system. Voter registration drives were also an effective method to increase non-tribal political participation among Native Americans. The Navajo were among the first to use this tactic. This resulted in significant increase in voter turnout in the 1970s.

== Party partisanship ==
=== National elections ===
Data from the earliest elections in which Native Americans could vote is scarce. The reason this is, according to political research, is because of a more recent development of political consciousness that began among Native Americans in the wake of the civil rights movements of the 1960s and 1970s. Often, even today, the Native vote is grouped together in demographic studies in the "other" category. Data has more specifically accounted for the Native vote in more recent elections (example: 2020 election). Generally, though, what is found by political research is, at least recently, Natives have generally favored the Democratic Party. Despite a lack of serious partisanship, they are even less likely than other ethnic groups to vote for a "split ticket", a trait they share with other minority voters as well.

What is known is that Natives likely developed great support for the Democratic Party, as with African Americans, because of their inclusion and participation in New Deal programs. Says one Native who recalls the New Deal Era: “We had it good once he [Roosevelt] was in charge. The New Deal was a big deal here." Republican senators’ ties to historic termination policies are also suggested as a factor into this preference, though Natives did have somewhat warm relations with Republican presidents Richard M. Nixon and Ronald Reagan.

What further illustrates this is, is that earlier research from 1979 and 1982 shows that Native Americans, in some areas more or less than others, were not very party rigid. Some specific tribes, such as the Navajo, have even historically preferred the Republican Party, though this has changed as well. Between 1984 and 1996, support for the Democratic Party never went below 75% (an increase from an average of 66% between 1970 and 1982). In general, Native Americans in all-Native precincts are more likely to vote more Democratic than in mixed or all-white precincts. More recent exit polls show that Natives had initially been more willing to break for Donald Trump in the 2016 election, which is an apparent increase from four years prior, when Mitt Romney was the Republican candidate. However, while the Native vote swung towards Joe Biden the next election, securing Arizona for the Democrats, NPR reported that Native Americans voted for Trump over Biden nationwide (albeit narrowly) by 52% to 45%. Republican and conservative politics tends to fare better with Natives in more mixed settings, namely more rural precincts, as seen in elections as recent as 2020. Exit poll data with a small and non-representative sample in the 2024 election claimed Native Americans broke heavily towards Trump, voting for him by a margin of 68% to 31% against his Democratic opponent Kamala Harris, and that 17 Native American-majority counties flipped Republican in 2024. However, a month after the election, data from the 2024 American Electorate Voter Poll with a larger and nationally representative sample size found that 57% and 39% of Native Americans voted for Harris and for Trump respectively.

Though a majority of Native American voters support the Democratic Party, the dominant political ideology among Natives is more complex. Exit polls and research over time illustrate that Natives tend to be political moderates and hold traditional values. New Mexico studies showed, for example, that Native voters there value "egalitarian, liberal care for the less fortunate", but also "self-determination and libertarianism". This specific study also says that they value "Reaganism".

Also, despite a general trend of low turnout, even before the great turnout bump of 2020, political researchers had for many years seen potential in the Native vote to hold great weight. Research that dates back to 1997 suggests that Natives had potential as swing voters in what were at the time deemed fairly equal in Democratic and Republican registration, such as Montana. Though today's trends make these states seem much more solidly Republican, the case of Arizona (a state once considered "solid red") in 2020 has led political research to focus once again on this phenomenon of their "swing power".

=== State elections ===
In addition to not being likely to "split ticket" vote, Natives have also proven to be helpful in swinging state elections over to Democrats. Even before 2020, Native voters provided great leeway for the Democrats. Political research attributes the Native vote as a major factor in the electing Democratic senators such as James E. Murray of Montana in 1954, George McGovern of South Dakota in 1962, and Maria Cantwell of Washington in 2000 (who still holds office, as of 2024).

Many states where Native reservations exist today are considered "solid Republican" states. Research attributes Natives’ inability to help at least narrow down these races is because of historic voter suppression (see above sections). Another reason this happens is that, as voter turnout in national elections has already been low for them, it has been reasonable to conclude that turnout in state elections would be even lower, a trend that most all American voters exemplify. Efforts by officials in states with heavier Native populations were able to greatly increase voter turnout for gubernatorial elections, especially in the 1970s, which has helped Native turnout increase in general over time.

=== As politicians ===
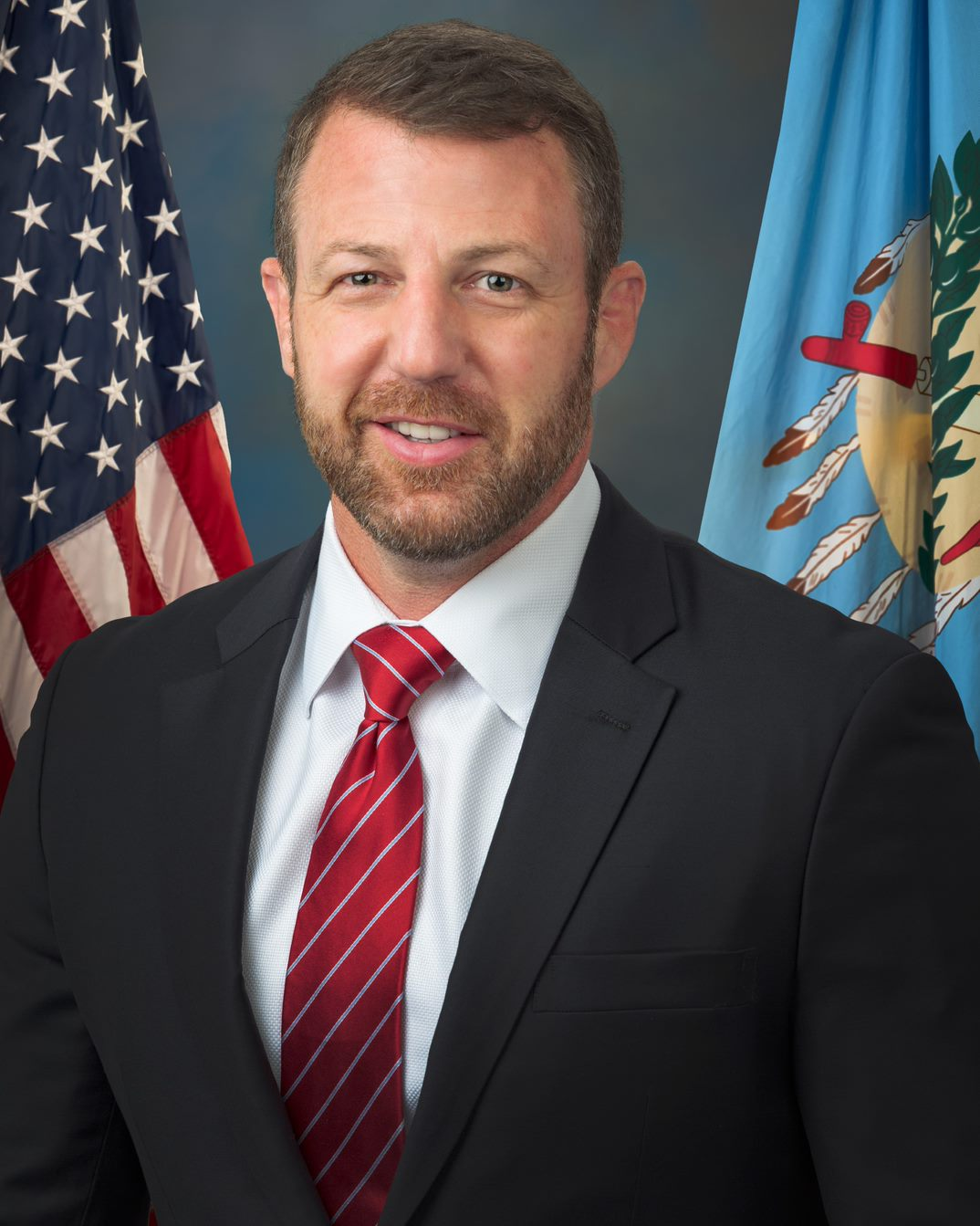
Senator Markwayne Mullin (R-OK), Cherokee

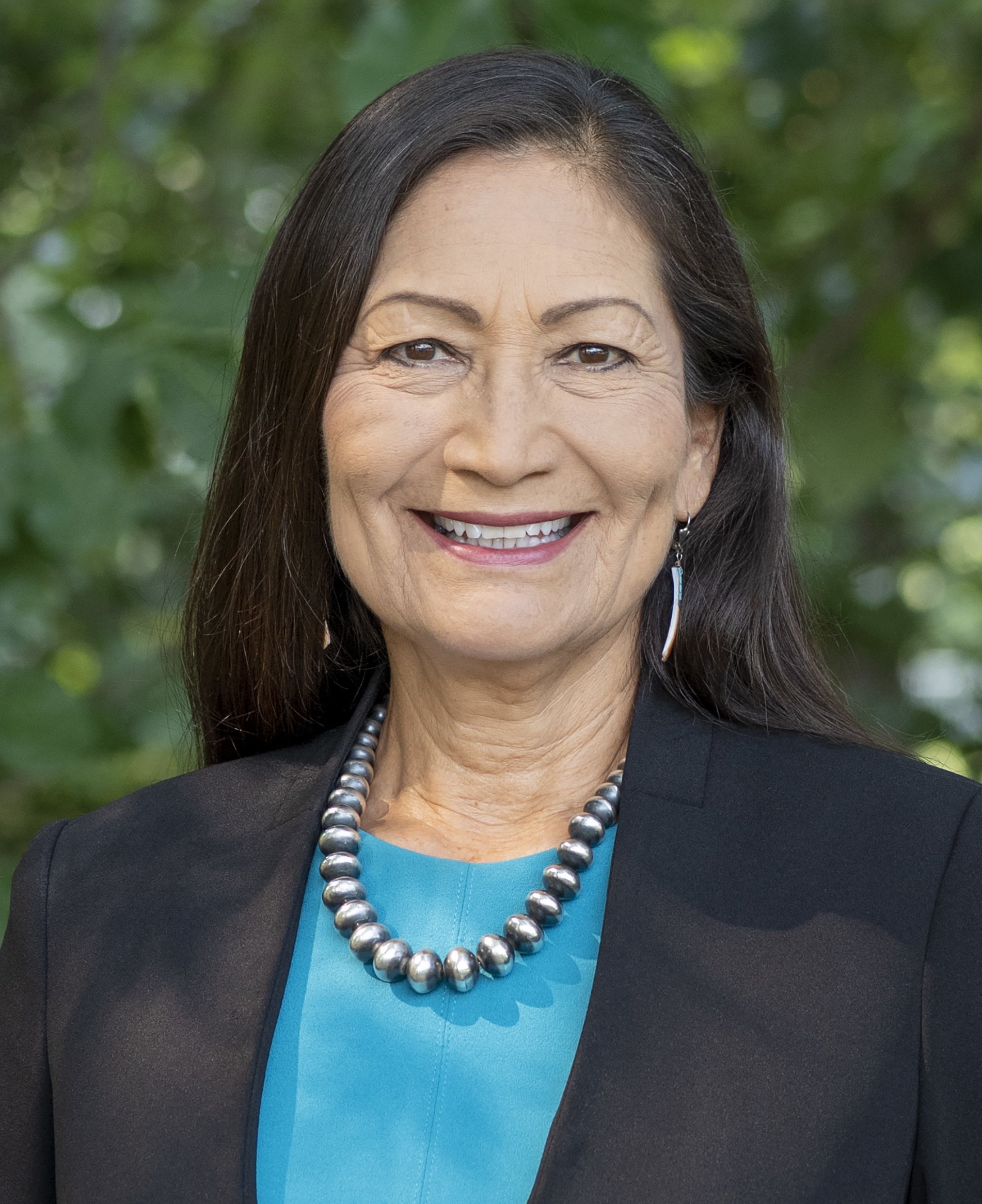
Interior Secretary Deb Haaland (D-NM), Pueblo

Over time, Native Americans have been able to gain more representation the more they overcome other legal barriers in voting rights. A previous lack in ability to do so can be traced back to a simple lack of the resources for Native Americans (see section on "economic factors"). In recent years, though, a general trend of increase in Native American representation has been evident, particularly in the legislative branch and in local offices.

In 1892, Charles Curtis (R-Kansas) was the first Native American elected to the House of Representatives; he also became the first Native American senator in 1914. This year held the first senate elections held after the passage of the Seventeenth Amendment to the United States Constitution, which allowed for the election of senators by popular vote. Upon becoming vice president following his election with Herbert Hoover in 1928, Curtis reached the highest elected office a Native American in the United States has ever reached, a record he still holds. No other Native Americans would be elected to Congress in either chamber until Republican Ben Reifel (Rosebud Lakota) of South Dakota, who served from 1961 to 1971; Ben Nighthorse Campbell (Northern Cheyenne) of Colorado was elected into the House of Representatives in 1986, and would become the first Native American in the Senate since Curtis when he was elected 1992 (although originally a member of the Democratic Party, Campbell left for the Republican Party in 1995).

As legal battles have been won against voter suppression, Native Americans have played more of a role in electing representatives from among their own. Among these historic changes were the local elections in McKinley County, New Mexico in 1972; Coconino County, Arizona in 1980; San Juan County, Utah in 1986; and in precincts across the Navajo reservation in 1990 (with 5 Navajos running under the slogan "it’s our turn"). As for state legislatures, between the 1980s to 2018, it was reported that the number of state legislators that are Native Americans has tripled. However, 64% of those representatives only live in five states.

=== Native American interest groups ===
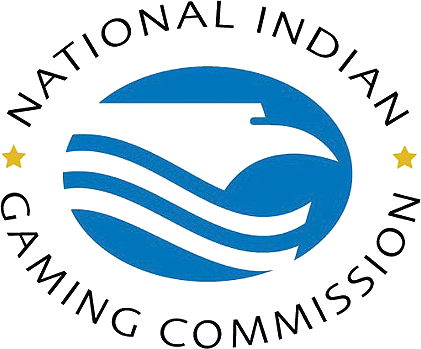
Logo of National Indian Gaming Commission

Natives have also been somewhat known to have played a role in lobbying. Native-specific interest groups have, since the 1980s, been demonstrating quite some influence in passing legislation such as gambling and gaming laws. A prominent example is the National Indian Gaming Commission, founded in 1988 after the passage of the Indian Gaming Regulatory Act (or IGRA). This group, along with other contributors, have been able to make Indian gaming make up 66% of PAC contributions by gaming corporations, according to data from 2004 (an increase from just 20% in 1994). Studies also show that such issues, when publicized by these groups, have also contributed to an increase in Native turnout. What has been gathered is that, in election years where certain gaming laws are on the ballot, Natives will be more likely to turn out and vote those years.

== See also ==
- Native Americans and women's suffrage in the United States
