= Indian arts and crafts laws =

Indian arts and crafts laws are federal, state, and tribal truth-in-advertising laws in the United States that prohibit misrepresentation in marketing of American Indian or Alaska Native arts and crafts products. The federal Indian Arts and Crafts Act of 1990 (IACA) defines an American Indian as a member of a federally- or state-recognized tribe, while state and tribal Indian arts and crafts laws typically restrict the definition of an American Indian to citizens of federally recognized tribes only. At least 13 states and 4 federally recognized American Indian tribes have passed Indian arts and crafts laws.

== Federal law ==
Hearing about Public Law 101-644 to expand the powers of the Indian Arts and Crafts Board, 2000

In 1935, the U.S. federal government passed the Indian Arts and Crafts Act which established the Indian Arts and Crafts Board but also addressed the problem of counterfeit Native American arts and crafts. The law gave penalties of $2,000 (approximately $45,783 in 2024 dollars) and/or six months in prison for selling any goods as "Indian products or Indian products of a particular Indian tribe or group, resident within the United States or the Territory of Alaska" which were not made by American Indians. This penalty was a misdemeanor.

Due to increasing Indigenous identity fraud in the 1970s and 1980s, Native American activists, including the Native American Artists Association cofounded by David Bradley (White Earth Ojibwe), Harvey Pratt (Cheyenne-Arapaho), Sharron Ahtone Harjo (Kiowa), Virginia Stroud (United Keetoowah Band/Muscogee), and others fought for stiffer penalties. This resulted in the Indian Arts and Crafts Act of 1990 (IACA), which made fraudulently selling work as American Indian–made, Native American–made, or created by a specific tribe a felony. Penalties for violating this law can result in fines up to $250,000 and/or prison terms up to five years. Testifying before Congress about the need for IACA enforcement, Harvey Pratt stated: "When Indian artists are undercut by the sale of fake Indian art, the integrity of authentic Indian art and artists suffer. We're also being robbed economically, culturally, and spiritually."

== State laws ==
States with active laws. Law struck down in court. No law or unknown.

Many states within the United States have passed American Indian arts and crafts laws, including Alaska, Arizona, California, Colorado, Minnesota, Missouri, Montana, Nebraska, Nevada, New Mexico, Oklahoma, South Dakota, and Texas.

=== Alaska ===
The Alaska Statutes defines an Alaska Native as "a state resident and who is an enrolled member of an Alaska tribe" and defines "authentic Alaska Native art" as works that are crafted or created within the state of Alaska by a citizen of an Alaska Native tribe.

=== Arizona ===
Arizona Revised Statutes Article 2.1 is titled "Fraudulent Practices in the Sale of Indian Arts and Crafts". The law defines an "Indian" as a citizen or a descendant of a federally recognized American Indian tribe.

=== California ===
California's Indian arts and crafts law was passed in 1965.

=== Colorado ===
Chapter 15 of Title 6 of the Colorado Revised Statutes stipulated that "Authentic Indian arts and crafts" are "any product that is handcrafted by Indian labor or workmanship." The law defines an "Indian" as a citizen or descendant of a federally recognized American Indian tribe.

=== Minnesota ===
Minnesota state law requires imitation Indian-style products to be listed as "not Indian-made". The law defines an Indian as "those made exclusively by persons who are of at least one-quarter Indian blood or who are listed on the rolls of the United States Bureau of Indian Affairs as Indians".

=== Missouri ===
Chapter 407 of the Missouri Title XXVI Trade and Commerce statute addresses penalties for the misleading sale of any work advertised as being "American Indian art or craft" that is not made by an "American Indian." American Indian is defined as "a person who is a citizen or enrolled member of an American Indian tribe." The law defines American Indian tribe as "any Indian tribe federally recognized by the Bureau of Indian Affairs of the United States Department of the Interior". The penalties are between $25 to $200 and/or imprisonment from 30 to 90 days.

=== Montana ===
Part 6 of the Montana Consumer Protection Act is titled "Sale of Imitation Indian Articles". The law defines an American Indian as an enrolled citizen of a federally recognized tribe.

=== Nebraska ===
Nebraska's American Indian Arts and Crafts Sales Act protects "American Indian craftpersons from false representation in the offerinq for sale, sale, trade, or purchase of authentic American Indian arts and crafts and natural and unnatural turquoise." The act defines an American Indian as any person who is of "at least one-quarter American Indian blood who is enrolled or is a lineal descendant" of a federally recognized American Indian tribe.

=== Nevada ===
The Nevada Revised Statutes prohibits the sale of "Imitation Indian arts or crafts articles" unless they are clearly labelled as imitations. The law defines an Indian as a citizen or descendant of a federally recognized American Indian tribe.

=== New Mexico ===
First passed in 1929, New Mexico's Indian Arts and Crafts Sales Act or "IACSA" (NMSA 1978, § 30-33-1 to 30-33-11) states that it is "unlawful to barter, trade, sell or offer for sale or trade any article represented as produced by an Indian unless the article is produced, designed or created by the labor or workmanship of an Indian."

=== Oklahoma ===
Oklahoma first passed an Indian arts and crafts law in 1974. The law required artists to be citizens of a federally recognized American Indian tribe in order to market their works as Indian-made. It was amended in 2016 to specify that only citizens of federally recognized tribes could market their artwork as being Native American or American Indian–made. In 2019, federal judge Charles Barnes Goodwin ruled that the law did not violate the 1st or 14th amendments but did violate the US Constitution's Surpemacy Clause.

=== South Dakota ===
The Codified Laws of South Dakota state that an "Indian" is a citizen or a descendant of a federally recognized American Indian tribe and that it "is a Class 2 misdemeanor for any person to distribute, sell, or offer for sale any article of American Indian art or craft unless the article is clearly and legibly labeled or branded as to place of manufacture."

=== Texas ===
The Texas Sale of Indian Articles Act (Tex. Bus. & Com. Code Ann. §§ 17.851 - 17.854) states that an American Indian is defined as a citizen of a federally recognized American Indian tribe or a member of a state-recognized tribe. However, there are no state-recognized tribes in Texas, nor does Texas have a process for state recognition.

== Tribal laws ==
Four federally recognized American Indian tribes reference the IACA in their tribal law codes, including the Cherokee Nation, the Coquille Indian Tribe, the Eastern Band of Cherokee Indians, and the Poarch Band of Creek Indians.

=== Coquille Indian Tribe ===
The Coquille Indian Tribe's Coquille Crafted Ordinance defines "Coquille Made" as referring to items made by enrolled citizens of the tribe.

=== Eastern Band of Cherokee Indians ===
The Eastern Band of Cherokee Indians' Tribal Business Preference Law authorizes the Tribal Employment Rights Office (TERO) to certify craft and artisan vendors. The laws defines a craft vendor as an "Eastern Band of Cherokee Indians enrolled member that provides handmade crafts for profit" and a Cherokee stone mason as an EBCI citizen who "provides culturally significant Cherokee stone masonry".

=== Poarch Band of Creek Indians ===
The Poarch Band of Creek Indians has a Tribal Member Indian Artist Certification which certifies tribal citizens as artisans for the purposes of the federal Indian Arts and Crafts Act of 1990. Artisan applicants must submit proof of their tribal citizenship by submitting a Verification of Tribal Membership letter from the Poarch Creek Tribal Enrollment Office or a copy of their tribal ID card.

== See also ==
- Federal Law for the Protection of Cultural Heritage of Indigenous and Afro-Mexican Peoples and Communities
- Indigenous intellectual property
- List of Native American artists
- Pretendian
- Visual arts of the Indigenous peoples of the Americas
