= Koshare Indian Museum and Dancers =

Museum in La Junta, Colorado

Koshare Indian Museum
- Coordinates: 37°58′19″N 103°32′40″W
- Website: www.koshares.com

The Koshare Indian Museum is an art and scouting museum in La Junta, Colorado. The building, located on the Otero Junior College campus, is a tri-level museum with an attached kiva that is built with the largest self-supporting log roof in the world. The building was built in 1949.

The museum features works of Pueblo and Plains tribal members.

The museum also facilitates Boy Scouts traveling to Philmont Ranch by providing museum discounts, as well as hostel stays for visiting Boy Scout troops.

For decades, Native American response to the Koshare dance performances has been negative based upon cultural appropriation of indigenous cultures as a form of racial discrimination.

== Koshare Indian Dancers ==
Koshare Indian Dancers
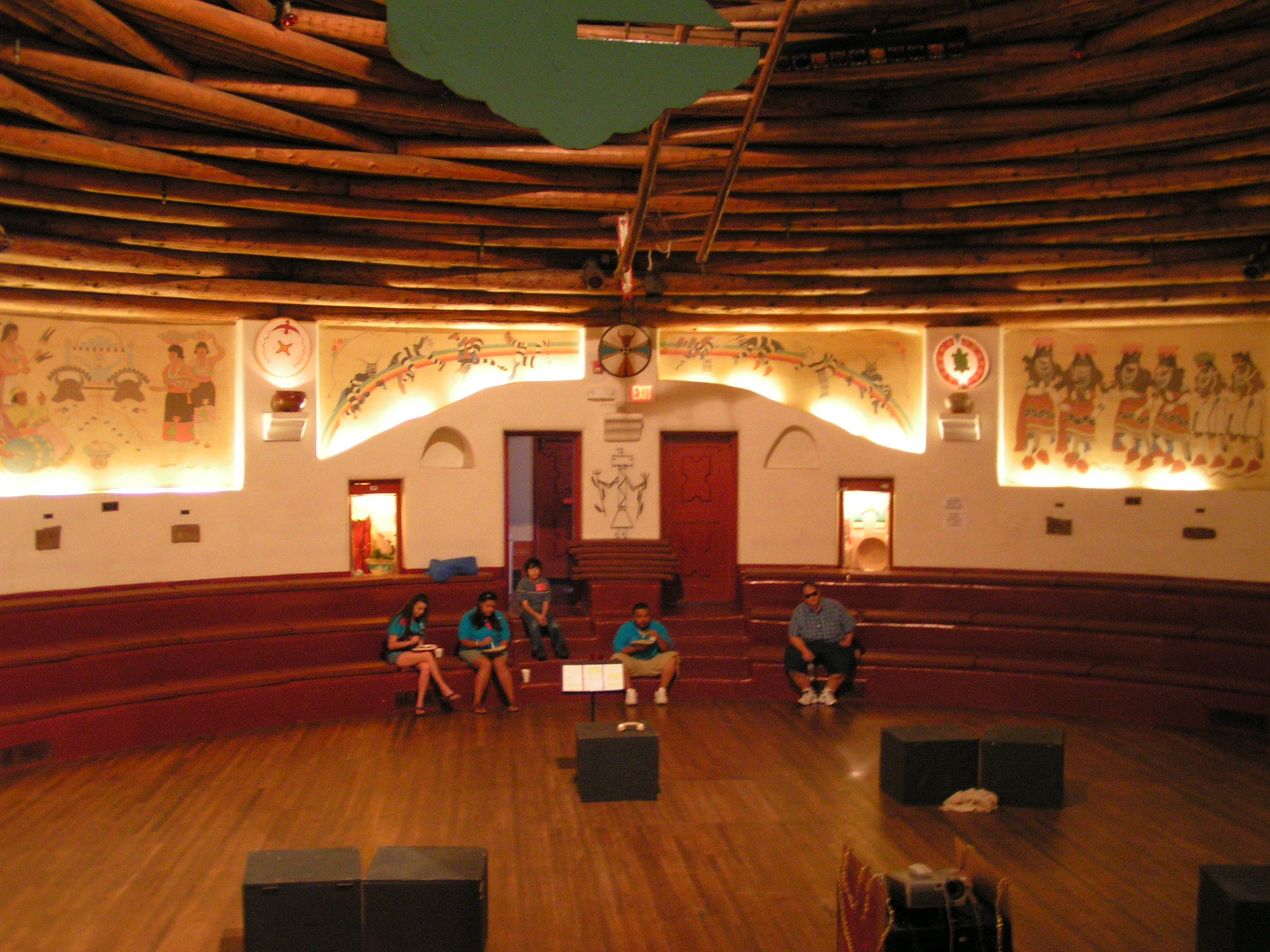
- Interior view of the Koshare Kiva where the Koshare Indian Dancers perform
- Headquarters: La Junta, Colorado
- Founded: 1933
- Founder: James F. "Buck" Burshears
- Affiliation: Boy Scouts of America
- Website www.kosharehistory.org

Koshare Indian Dancers are members of Boy Scout Troop 232 in the Rocky Mountain Council of the Boy Scouts of America, located in La Junta, Colorado. They have been performing their interpretations of Native American dance since 1933. In addition to participating in regular Scouting activities, such as camping, merit badge projects, and community service, Koshares create a dance outfit, including leatherwork and beading, based upon their own historical research. They travel around the country and perform traditional Plains and Pueblo Native American ceremonial dances. They also perform 50–60 Summer and Winter Ceremonial shows, annually, at their kiva located at the Koshare Indian Museum in La Junta. The Koshares have performed in 47 states.

=== History ===
Founded by Scoutmaster and author of "The Scoutmaster's Prayer" James F. "Buck" Burshears (1909–1987) in February 1933 the Koshares, originally called the Boy Scout Indian Club, first practiced in Burshears's backyard and chicken coop. Their name was subsequently changed to Koshare, meaning clown or "delight-maker" in the Hopi language, as Burshears thought the name appropriate for the early members of the troop. Bill Sisson and Bob Inman, the first two Koshare Scouts, expanded Boy Scout Troop 232 to include eighteen other Scouts. Their first performance took place in September 1933, at St. Andrew's Episcopal Church in La Junta, Colorado.

I have been to many spectacles, from Madison Square Garden and the New Amsterdam Theatre to the Hollywood Bowl and the Santa Anita race track, and there is nothing in my memory to match a performance of these Boy Scouts which was recently given at the Red Rock Theatre, up in the hills from Denver.

Be a Great Boy is a compilation of memoirs from past Koshare Indian Dancers. The book also serves as an archive of the museum's history and media coverage.

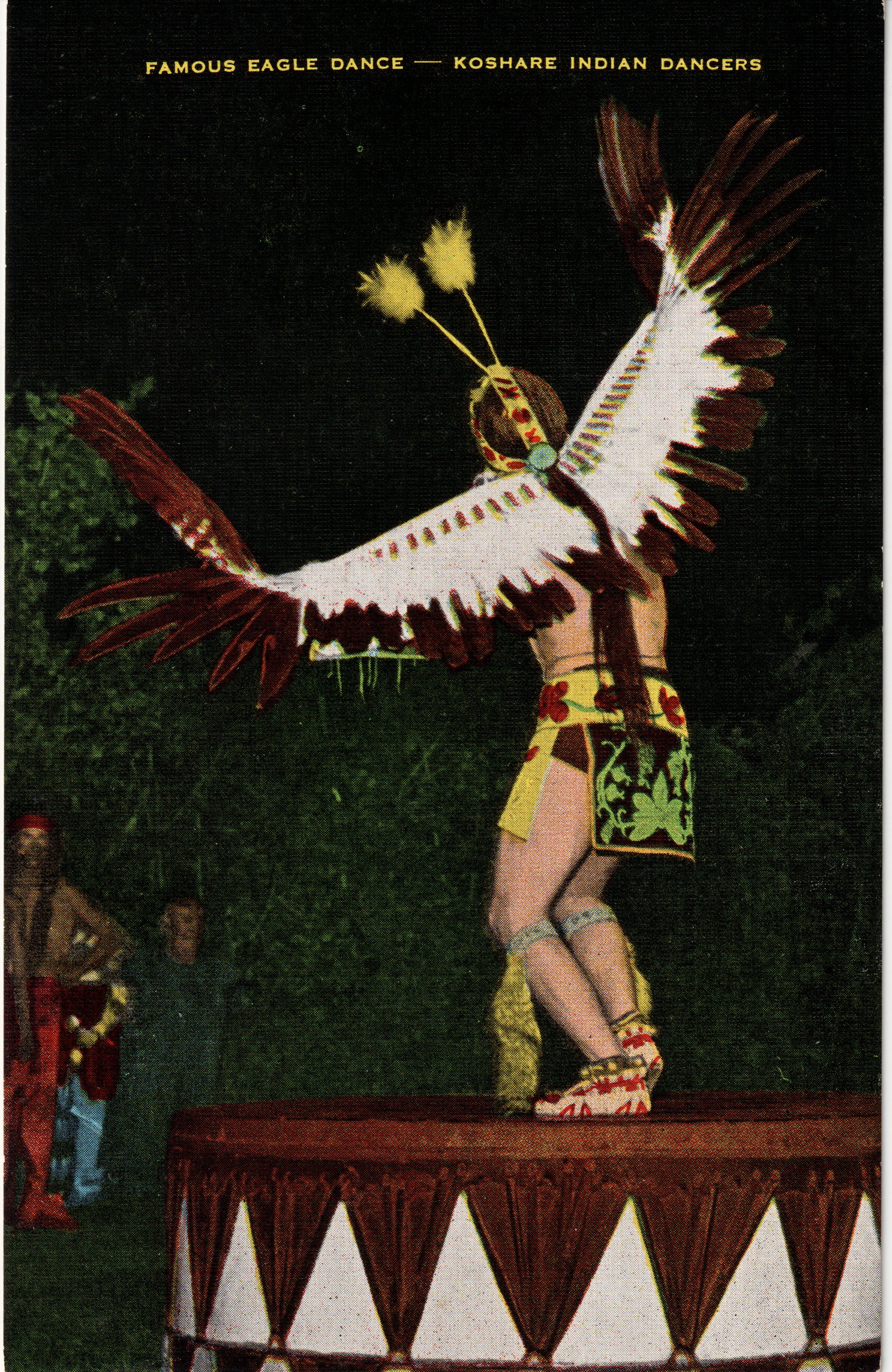
Famous eagle dance -- Koshare Indian Dancers, circa 1950s

=== Koshare ranks ===
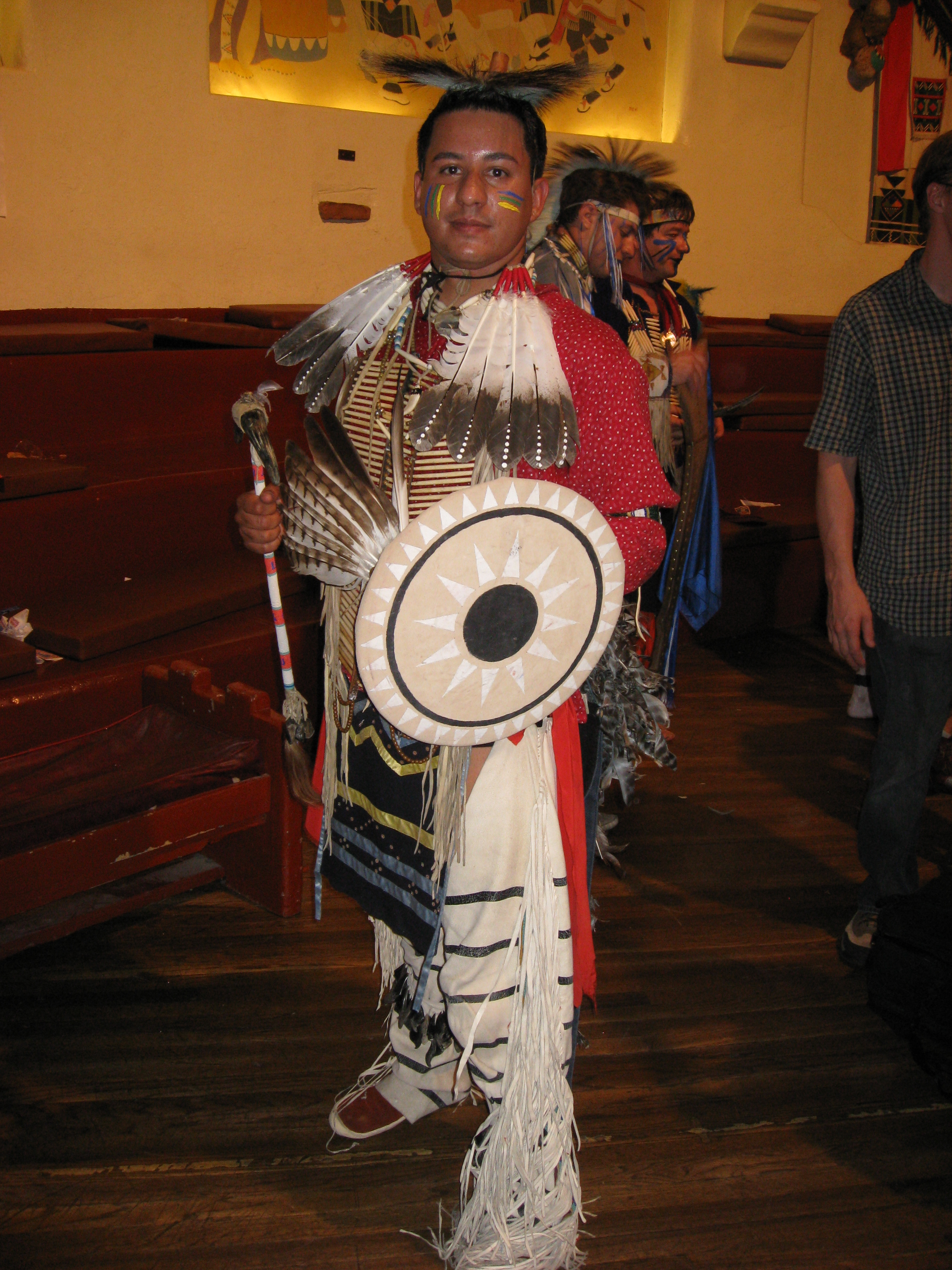
Koshare Dancer as Sioux Warrior

In addition to fulfilling Boy Scout requirements, members dedicate additional time to learn Native American culture, ceremonial dances and recreate Native American regalia. Koshares may increase their ranks within their individual tribes by completing various Scouting activities and fulfilling rank-specific requirements. The three different tribes whose dance styles are represented include the Kiowa, Sioux, and the Navajo.

New members are called Papooses. They must be at least 11 years old, but no older than 18 or have earned an Arrow of Light Award, which is the highest Cub Scout award.

After having obtained their Star Scout Rank, they may work towards the status of Koshare Brave. In order to become a Brave, the Scout must maintain a "C" average in school, earn the Indian Lore Merit Badge, be well practiced in five Koshare Indian dances, exemplify good Scout attitude, read five books about Native American culture, create a well researched outfit, and be elected by current Koshare members.

Following the rank of Brave, a Scout may become a Clan Chief, with one Chief for each of the three tribes, after attaining their Eagle Scout. Additionally, each year one Eagle Scout is elected to be the Head Chief and is responsible for leading all members.

The Clowns, painted in black and white, intercede between dances to provide comic relief, by taunting the crowd and mimicking the dancers. In the Pueblo culture, the clowns, or koshare, help to depict unacceptable behavior and teach values.

In 1995, in an attempt to make the dances more accurate, two girls were allowed to perform with the Koshares each year. Thanks to its success, in 2003, girls were invited to join the performances, regularly, and the "maiden program" was created.

=== 75th anniversary ===
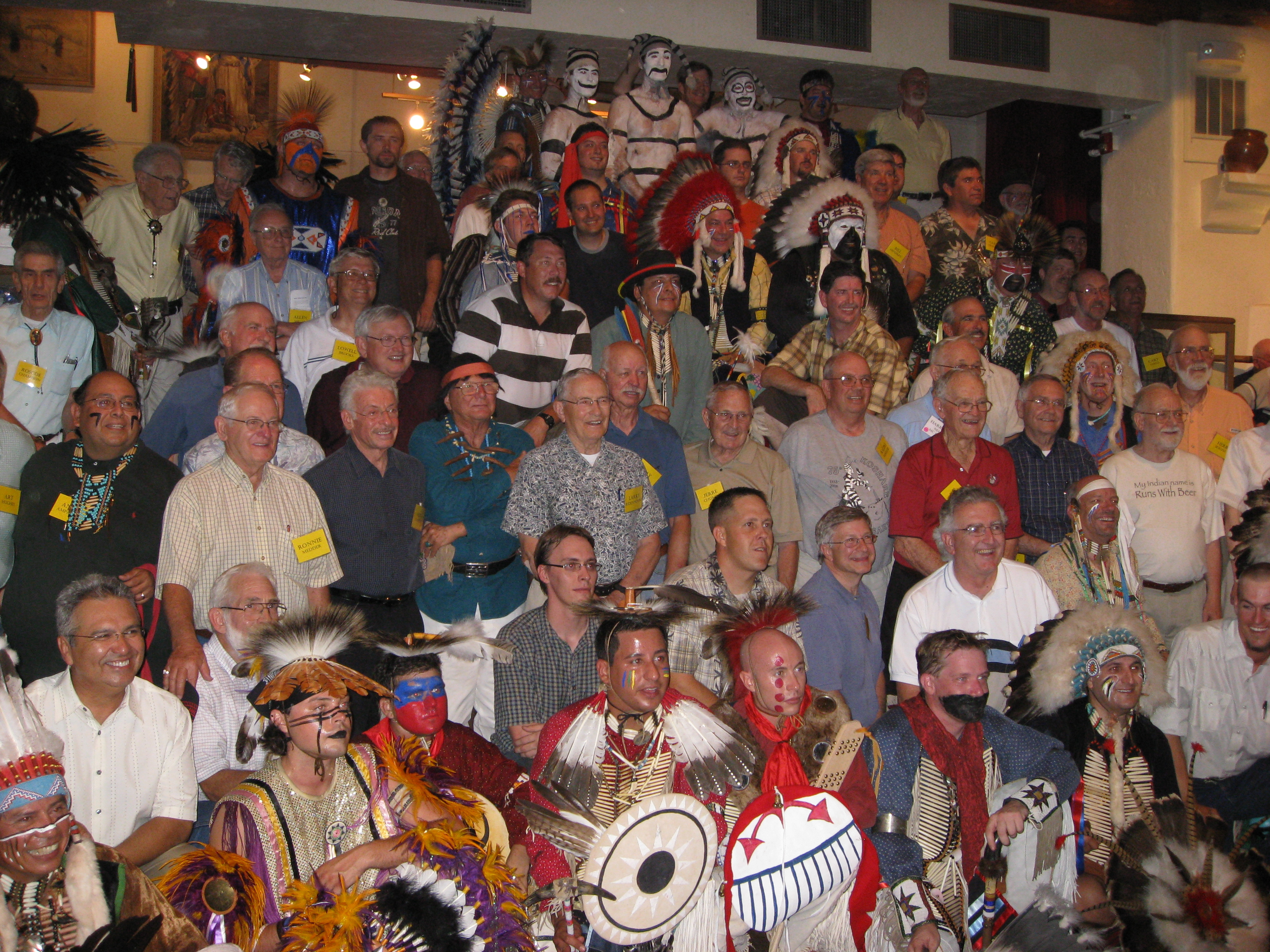
Group photo of current and former Koshare Indian Dancers at the 75th anniversary celebration

On July 25, 2008 the Koshares celebrated their 75th anniversary with a reunion at the kiva. All former members were invited to join with the current members in an evening performance. The two original members, Bill Sisson and Bob Inman were in attendance along with hundreds of current and former members.

== Native American responses ==
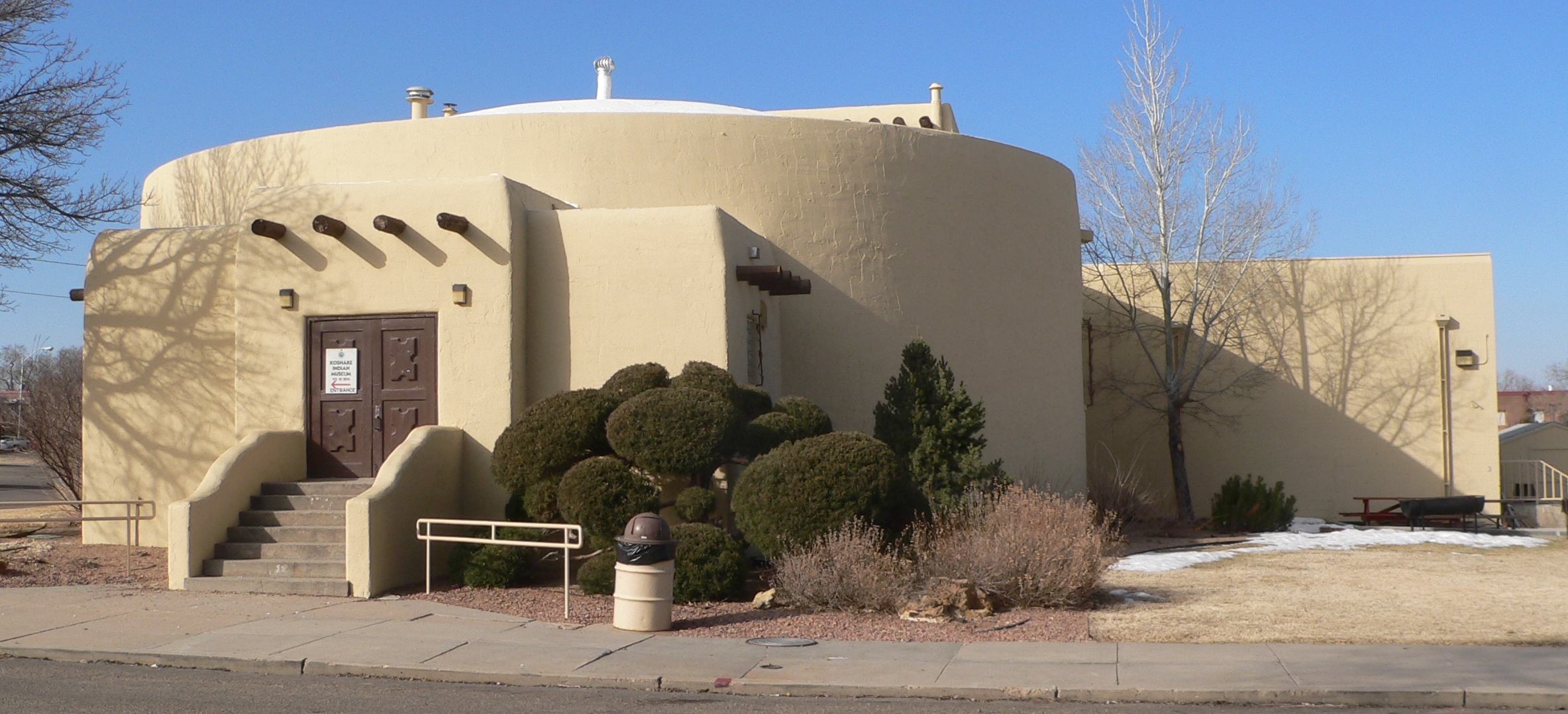
Koshare Indian Museum in La Junta, Colorado

In chapter four of his book Playing Indian, Native American historian Philip J. Deloria refers to the Koshare Indian Museum and Dancers as an example of "object hobbyists" who adopt the material culture of indigenous peoples of the past ("the vanishing Indian") while failing to engage with contemporary native peoples. Some Native Americans have stated that all such impersonations and performances are a form of cultural appropriation which place dance and costumes in an inappropriate context devoid of their true meaning, sometimes mixing elements from different tribes.

Great offense was taken by the head councilman of the Zuni Pueblo upon witnessing a performance in the 1950s. "We know your hearts are good," he said, "but even with good hearts you have done a bad thing." At a later debate in La Junta, a member of the Zuni community stated,“These gods are powerful, and they do not belong to you.” In Zuni culture religious objects and practices are only for those that have earned the right to participate, following techniques and prayers that have been handed down for generations. A Koshare's point of view on this incident is presented in Behind the Zuni Masks.

In May 1972 hundreds of Native Americans, including members of the American Indian Movement (AIM) and the local Indian Center, protested an event hosting the Koshare Dancers sponsored by the city of Topeka, Kansas. Members of the Indian Center and AIM were angered over the Koshare being hired rather than an authentic Native American drum and dance group located in Mayetta. The intention was to not only protest the dancers, who were being paid $2,000, but to break the drum belonging to the Koshare as well. Five members of the American Indian Movement were able to breach the group of police officers tasked to guard the dancers. They did not make it to the stage and at least one AIM member was beaten to the ground by officers. AIM believed they had gained the attention of the public and the Indians vs. Scouts incident resulted in embarrassing the city of Topeka.

In 2015, the Winter Night dances were canceled after a request was received from Cultural Preservation Office (CPO) of the Hopi Nation asking that the troop discontinue their interpretation of the dances of the Hopi and Pueblo Native Americans. When Leigh Kuwanwisiwma, the director of the CPO learned in 2016 about the program and saw video online of some of the performances, he was disturbed. The performers, he said, were "mimicking our dances, but they were insensitive, as far as I'm concerned."

As of 2019, the Koshare have resumed their performance schedule without having further communications with Native Americans. This continues in 2025, as evidenced by an April performance in Bent County, Colorado.

== See also ==
- Otero Junior College
