= List of people from La Junta, Colorado =

Coordinates: 37.9850°N 103.5438°W

Location of La Junta in Colorado

This is a list of some notable people who have lived in the City of La Junta, Colorado, United States.

== Arts and entertainment ==
- William Charles Anderson (1920–2003), novelist, screenwriter
- J. F. Burshears (1909–1987), Koshare Indian Dancers founder
- James Erb (1926–2014), composer, conductor, arranger
- Ken Kesey (1935–2001), novelist, essayist
- The Space Lady (1948– ), singer-songwriter, musician

== Military ==
- Wendell Fertig (1900–1975), U.S. Army colonel, World War II guerrilla leader
- Ambrosio Guillen (1929–1953), U.S. Marine Corps staff sergeant, Medal of Honor recipient

== Politics ==
=== National ===
- Lewis Babcock (1943– ), U.S. federal judge
- Linda Smith (1950– ), U.S. Representative from Washington

=== State ===
- Judy Burges (1943– ), Arizona state legislator
- C. A. Robins (1884–1970), 22nd governor of Idaho

== Sports ==
=== American football ===
- Larry Elliott (1935–2008), coach
- Dustin Osborn (1984– ), wide receiver
- Eugene Reusser (1922–2010), coach

=== Baseball ===
- Tippy Martinez (1950– ), pitcher
- Mike Oquist (1968– ), pitcher

=== Other ===
- Lane Frost (1963–1989), rodeo bull rider
- Everett Marshall (1905-1972), professional wrestler

== See also ==
- List of people from Colorado
- Bibliography of Colorado
- Geography of Colorado
- History of Colorado
- Index of Colorado-related articles
- List of Colorado-related lists
- Outline of Colorado
