= Vanishing Indian (disambiguation) =

The vanishing Indian is a stereotype in the depiction of Indigenous peoples of the Americas, depicting them as the "Vanishing Race".

Vanishing Indian may also refer to:

- Playing Indian, a 1998 nonfiction book by Philip J. Deloria on stereotypical ideas of "Indianness"
- The Vanishing Indian, an episode of the 1935 film serial The Miracle Rider
- The Vanishing American, a 1925 silent film
