= Miona Springs =

Spring in Georgia, USA

Coordinates: 32°24′47.55″N 84°2′54.67″W

Miona Springs is a spring in the U.S. state of Georgia.

"Miona" is a name of a fictional Indian princess character taken from a Civil War-era work. It was once believed that the waters of Miona Springs had healing properties, and in 1915 a mineral spa resort stood there.
