= Lynda Page =

English novelist, born c. 1950

- Born: Leicester, UK
- Occupation: Novelist
- Writing career
- Pen name: None
- Genre: Saga
- Website: www.lyndapage.co.uk

Lynda Page (c. 1950-2024) was a saga author based in the Lincolnshire village of Epworth, England, where she lived on her daughter's holiday park. She has written over 20 critically praised saga novels, which reached the bestseller charts of WH Smiths and The Sunday Times.

== Early work ==
Born and raised in Leicester, she left home at 17. Page began writing her first novel, Annie, in 1987, during lunch hours while working in various jobs, among them as a secretary with Land Rover Parts in Desford. Annie was sent by a friend to the literary agent Darley Anderson, who arranged for her to sign a contract with her current publishers, Headline. Her debut novel, Evie, was released in 1992, followed by Annie. Her next two books had the main character as the title; later her titles were popular sayings.

== Style ==
Page's novels are predominantly set in Leicester and are renowned for strong plots and characters. Her books make use of Leicestershire speech and often involve a sense of intrigue or crime. Initially, her time settings ranged from the turn of the 20th century (At the Toss of a Sixpence) to the 1970s (Josie). In the 2000s, she found a niche writing sagas set in the 1950s and 1960s. Some of her recent books feature the fictitious holiday camp Jolly's in the 1960s.

== Books ==
- Evie (1992)
- Annie (1993)
- Josie (1994)
- Peggie (1994)
- And One for Luck (1995)
- Just by Chance (1996)
- At the Toss of a Sixpence (1997)
- Any Old Iron (1998)
- Now or Never (1999)
- In for a Penny (2000)
- All or Nothing (2001)
- A Cut Above (2002)
- Out with the Old (2003)
- Against the Odds (2004)
- No Going Back (2004)
- Whatever it Takes (2005)
- A Lucky Break (2005)
- For What It's Worth (2006)
- Onwards and Upwards (2006)
- The Sooner the Better (2007)
- A Mother's Sin (2007)
- Time For A Change (2008)
- No Way Out (2008)
- Secrets To Keep (2009)
- A Bitter Legacy (2010)
- The Price To Pay (2011)
- A Perfect Christmas (2012)
- The Time Of Our Lives (2013)
- Where Memories Are Made (2014)
- Let The Good Times Roll (2015)
- Now or Never (2016)
- All is Fair (2018)
- All the Fun of the Fair (2018)
