= Mary Sully =

Native American artist (1896–1963)

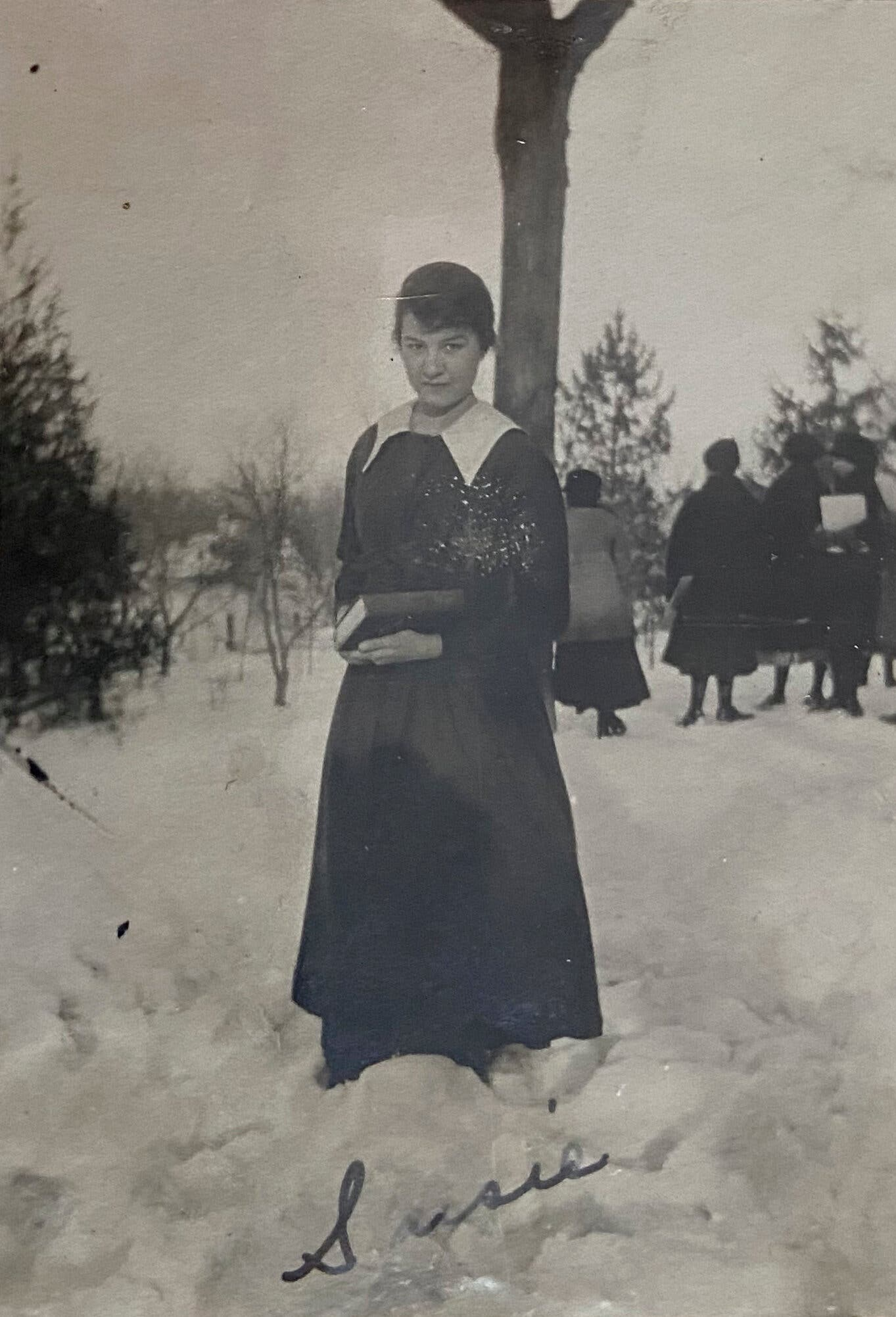
- Sully around 1912
- Born: Susan Mabel Deloria; May 2, 1896; Standing Rock Indian Reservation, South Dakota
- Died: August 29, 1963 (aged 67); Omaha, Nebraska

Mary Sully (1896–1963) was a Yankton Dakota avant-garde artist. Her work remained largely unknown until the early 21st century. Sully is best known for her colored-pencil triptychs and "personality prints," which often depicted celebrities such as Amelia Earhart, Gertrude Stein, and Greta Garbo. Her panels, characterized by abstract forms, symbols, rich colors, and symmetry, often appear kaleidoscopic in nature.

Her designs draw from and incorporate classic Native American designs — specifically Navajo textiles and Plains parfleches, painted rawhide containers — while also aligning with the Art Nouveau and Bauhaus movements. Although she was active during the early decades of the 20th century, when Native American art and Art Nouveau were gaining prominence in mainstream fine art exhibitions, Sully was considered revolutionary for her synthesis of these two genres.

== Early life and background ==
Mary Sully was born Susan Mable Deloria on the Standing Rock Reservation in South Dakota in 1896. She was the daughter of Tipi Sapa (Black Lodge), or Philip J. Deloria, and Mary Sully. She was the great-granddaughter of the respected 19th-century American portrait artist Thomas Sully, known for capturing the personalities of America's early celebrities, including the figure of Andrew Jackson immortalized on the twenty-dollar bill. She was also the granddaughter of military officer Alfred Sully.

Her sister, Ella Cara Deloria, was an anthropologist with whom she traveled extensively throughout the United States, visiting many Native communities and observing the art that was integral to their daily lives. Sully also spent much of her time in New York City, drawing inspiration from the thriving art scene there.

Her nephew, Vine Deloria Jr. was an author, Native American rights activist and scholar. He was head of the National Congress of American Indians in 1960.

Sully was raised in the Episcopal faith, as her father was a minister. Her familiarity and experience with religion is depicted in several of her works.

Sully died on August 29, 1963, in Omaha, Nebraska.

== Artwork ==
Sully primarily worked in triptychs, three-paneled pieces that often served as "personality prints" of celebrities or public figures. These portraits captured the essence of their subjects through abstract symbolism and a cohesive color palette that unified the three panels.

Kagawa is an example of one such portrait, depicting Toyohiko Kagawa, a Japanese social reformer and Christian missionary. The first panel features a prominent purple cross surrounded by dynamic patterns that suggest movement and depth. The central panel reinterprets the first with a kaleidoscopic effect, focusing on and symmetrically arranging elements from the initial design, including three rows of seven oval shapes amid sharp angles. The third panel draws upon the designs of the first two, such as crosses and circles, but incorporates traditional Navajo motifs, reminiscent of Navajo textiles or Plains beadwork. Sully appears to have intentionally blended these customary Navajo designs with Christian imagery.

Curator Jill Ahlberg Yohe has remarked on the subversive nature of Sully's symbolism, stating, "Christianity was imposed on Dakota and Lakota people, so a lot of traditional practices were banned, but if you could superimpose them on Christianity, you could subvert that system and still maintain a lot of traditional practices". This is also evident in Sully's triptych, The Indian Church.

== Legacy ==
In 2019, Sully's great-nephew, Philip J. Deloria, published Becoming Mary Sully: Toward an American Indian Abstract, a book exploring Sully's life and art. Deloria contends that Sully's work embodies a distinctive anti-colonial aesthetic, positioning Indigenous women as crucial figures in shaping the future of American Indian culture, both within and apart from mainstream American modernism.

Despite her innovative approach, Sully's position on the margins of the art world meant that her work was exhibited only a handful of times during her life.

Several works by Sully are held in the permanent collection of the Metropolitan Museum of Art (Met). Additionally, three of her works were included in the 2019 exhibition “Hearts of Our People: Native Women Artists” at Minneapolis Institute of Art.

A new exhibition was presented at The Met after they acquired more works by Sully. It ran from July 18, 2024–January 12, 2025. It was part of The American Wing at 100, that marks the wing's 2024 centennial.

In 2025, the Minneapolis Institute of Art opened Mary Sully: Native Modern, the first major solo exhibition Sully. The show, on view from March 23 to September 21, 2025, presents 18 of her abstract "personality prints" alongside photographs, memorabilia and Native works including a beaded stole and Bible cover, highlighting her blend of Dakota traditions with early 20th-century popular culture. The exhibition includes recent acquisitions by Mia and objects shared with or acquired by The Metropolitan Museum of Art.

Works by Mary Sully were included in the group exhibition An Indigenous Present at the Institute of Contemporary Art in Boston. The exhibition was curated by Jeffrey Gibson and Jenelle Porter, and runs from October 9, 2025-March 8, 2026. It grew out of Gibson and Porter's 2023 book of the same name, An Indigenous Present, which showcased 60 contemporary Indigenous artists.

In 2026, James Cohan Gallery staged the first gallery presentation of works by Mary Sully in collaboration with the Mary Sully Foundation. The exhibition runs from May 15-June 27, 2026.
