= Saga novel =

Literary genre

A saga novel is a genre encompassing the wide scopes of stories and narratives such as religious saga, national saga, family saga, or human saga.

== History ==
The saga novel as a genre originates from the Icelandic history of family sagas

== Examples ==
A major example of a saga novel in English literature is George Eliot's Middlemarch. In Russia, Leo Tolstoy's War and Peace is a representative saga novel. In Korea, Kyunglee Park's Lands (Toji) is another example. In the United States, Pearl S. Buck's The Good Earth and Margaret Mitchell's Gone with the Wind belong to the category of saga novels. In China, Luo Guanzhong (Lo Kuanchung)'s Sanguo zhi yanyi (Sankuo chi yen-i; Romance of the Three Kingdoms) is the most representative and well-known saga novel since the 14th century.

Examples of Saga Novels
Title	Author	Year	Culture/Nation/Category
Buddenbrooks	Thomas Mann	1901	Germany
East of Eden	John Steinbeck	1952	US
One Hundred Years of Solitude	Gabriel García Márquez	1967	Colombia
The Patternist Series	Octavia E. Butler	1976	US
Roots	Alex Haley	1976	US
Hanta Yo	Ruth Beebe Hill	1979	US
Chesapeake	James A. Michener	1978	US
The House of the Spirits	Isabel Allende	1982	Chile
Waterlily	Ella C. Deloria	1988	US
The Inheritance Trilogy	N. K. Jemisin	2010	US
Barkskins	Annie Proulx	2016	Canada/US
Homegoing	Yaa Gyasi	2016	Ghana/US
Pachinko	Min Jin Lee	2017	Korea/Japan
A Woman is No Man	Etaf Rum	2019	Arab/US
The Old Drift	Namwali Serpell	2019	Zambia
The Yellow House	Sarah M Broom	2019	New Orleans
