= Red Earth, White Lies =

Book by Vine Deloria, Jr.

Red Earth, White Lies: Native Americans and the Myth of Scientific Fact
- Author: Vine Deloria, Jr.
- Language: English
- Subject: Creation beliefs of American Indians
- Genre: Historical criticism
- Publisher: Fulcrum Publishing
- Publication date: 1997-08-19
- Publication place: United States
- Media type: Paperback
- Pages: 288
- ISBN: 1-55591-388-1

Red Earth, White Lies: Native Americans and the Myth of Scientific Fact is a book by Native American author Vine Deloria, originally published in 1995. The book's central theme is to criticize the scientific consensus regarding the history of the Americas and the age of the Earth. He stated that in this book "We will encounter a number of amazing inconsistencies in the manner in which science describes the world we live in and the role it has chosen for American Indians to play in a largely fictional scenario describing prehistoric North America.

== Overview ==
The book's particular focus is on a criticism of current models of migration to the New World, in particular the Bering land bridge theory. Deloria attempts to expose what he thought were fundamental weaknesses in this theory by detailing supposed archeological inconsistencies and positing alternative hypotheses that he believed align better with his understanding of the origins of Native Americans. He argued that there was an earlier presence for indigenous peoples in the Americas than what the archaeological record provides. In a similar vein, he criticized the so-called "overkill hypothesis", which proposes that humans migrating into the Americas were partially responsible, by overhunting, for the sudden and rapid extinction of North American megafauna during the Pleistocene epoch. Deloria believed that this hypothesis was racist; he contended that the Pleistocene extinction had no parallel on such a scale in Eurasia, which also experienced the sudden arrival of human hunters.

Deloria likened the dominant migration theory to "academic folklore" and contended that even though it was regularly cited as fact, it was not critically examined within the field of archeology. Further, he charged that prevailing theories did not mesh with Native American oral traditions, which he contended contain no accounts of inter-continental migration. He argued for a Young Earth with only one Ice Age, for a worldwide flood, and for the survival of dinosaurs into the 19th century.

== Criticism ==
John Whittaker, a Professor of Archaeology at Grinnell College, referred to Deloria's Red Earth, White Lies as "a wretched piece of Native American creationist claptrap that has all the flaws of the Biblical creationists he disdains...Deloria's style is drearily familiar to anyone who has read the Biblical creationist literature...At the core is a wishful attempt to discredit all science because some facts clash with belief systems. A few points will suffice to show how similar Deloria is to outspoken creationist author Duane Gish or any of his ilk."

Michael D. Gordin notes the book's close ties to Immanuel Velikovsky's cosmographical works, especially the revindication of oral myth and tradition as central to revising both history and myths' role in the study of history. Deloria had entered Velikovsky's circle in 1974, calling the psychologist "perhaps the greatest brain that our race has produced." Gordin concludes Deloria's rejection of the Bering land bridge and "attack on any affinity between Native tradition and Western culture and science" was derived from Velikovskian catastrophism, though Velikovsky himself rejected any hint of creationism.

Deloria's son, historian Philip J. Deloria, takes up his father's theme of "deep-time" historians. Despite admitting a wish that the book "had been more attentive to evidence, historiography, interpretation and argument," he notes that it did reveal problems with "supposedly neutral science-based narratives of the deep past," many of which have since been revised or replaced altogether. Vine Deloria, he suggests, wanted those writing about the deep past to stop "universalizing their own epistemic position" and to accept that Indigenous histories might have something to teach them.

== See also ==
- Beringia
- Models of migration to the New World
