= Stereotypes of Indigenous peoples of Canada and the United States =

Generalized representations of Indigenous peoples

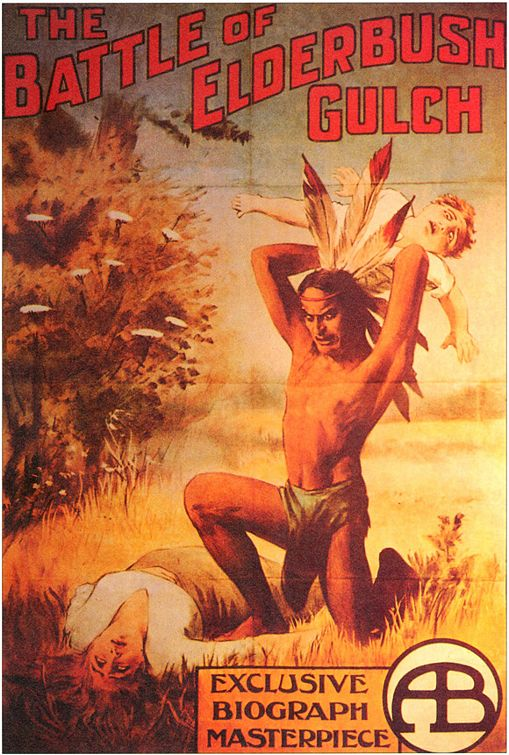
Film poster for D. W. Griffith's 1913 film The Battle at Elderbush Gulch, showing a depiction of a Native American warrior as a depraved child murderer and threat to the purity of white womanhood

Stereotypes of Indigenous peoples of Canada and the United States include many ethnic stereotypes found worldwide which include historical misrepresentations and the oversimplification of hundreds of Indigenous cultures. Negative stereotypes are associated with prejudice and discrimination that continue to affect the lives of Indigenous peoples.

Indigenous peoples of the Americas are commonly called Native Americans in the United States (excluding Alaskan and Hawaiian Natives) or First Nations people (in Canada). The Circumpolar peoples of the Americas, often referred to by the English term Eskimo, have a distinct set of stereotypes. Eskimo itself is an exonym, deriving from phrases that Algonquin tribes used for their northern neighbors, in Canada the term Inuit is generally preferred, while Alaska Natives is used in the United States.

It is believed that some portrayals of Natives, such as their depiction as bloodthirsty savages have disappeared. However, most portrayals are oversimplified and inaccurate; these stereotypes are found particularly in popular media which is the main source of mainstream images of Indigenous peoples worldwide.

The stereotyping of American Indians must be understood in the context of history which includes conquest, forced displacement, and organized efforts to eradicate native cultures, such as the boarding schools of the late 19th and early 20th centuries, which separated young Native Americans from their families to educate and to assimilate them as European Americans. There are also many examples of seemingly positive stereotypes which rely on European "noble savage" imagery, but also contribute to the infantilization of Indigenous cultures.

== Indigenous terminology ==
The first difficulty in addressing stereotypes is the terminology to use when referring to Indigenous peoples, which is an ongoing controversy. The truly stereotype-free names would be those of individual nations. A practical reference to Indigenous peoples, in general, is "American Indian" in the United States and "First Nations" or "Indigenous" in Canada. The peoples collectively referred to as Inuit have their own unique stereotypes. The communities to which Indigenous peoples belong also have various names, typically "nation" or "tribe" in the United States, but "comunidad" (Spanish for "community") in South America.

All global terminology must be used with an awareness of the stereotype that "Indians" are a single people, when in fact there are hundreds of individual ethnic groups, who are all native to the Americas, just as the term "Europeans" carries an understanding that there are some similarities but also many differences between the peoples of an entire continent.

== American Natives ==
Since the first Europeans made landfall in North America, Native peoples have suffered under a weltering array of stereotypes, misconceptions and caricatures. Whether portrayed as noble savages, ignoble savages, teary-eyed environmentalists, drunken, living off the Government, Indian princess/Squaw or most recently, simply as casino-rich, native peoples find their efforts to be treated with a measure of respect and integrity undermined by images that flatten complex tribal, historical and personal experience into one-dimensional representations that tells us more about the depicters than about the depicted.

— Carter Meland (Anishinaabe heritage) and David E. Wilkins (Lumbee), professors of Native American Studies at the University of Minnesota.

Myths about American Indians can be understood in the context of the metanarrative of the United States, which was originally "manifest destiny" and has now become "American exceptionalism". Myths and stereotypes persist because they fit into these narratives, which Americans use to understand their own history. This history includes the description of Native Americans in the Declaration of Independence as "merciless Indian savages". These stereotypes have historical, cultural, and racial characteristics.

=== Historical misconceptions ===
There are numerous distortions of history, many of which continue as stereotypes.

There is the myth that Indians are a dying race, i.e. "The Vanishing Red Man", when in fact census data shows an increase in the number of individuals who were American Indians and Alaska Natives or American Indian and Alaska Native in combination with one or more other races.

There is an assumption that Indians lost possession of their land because they were inferior, when the reality is:

1. Many of the Indigenous peoples died from Old World diseases to which they lacked any immunity.
2. There were a number of advanced civilizations in the Americas, but they did lack two important resources: a pack animal large enough to carry a human; and the ability to make steel for tools and weapons.

==== Purchase of Manhattan ====
The "purchase" of Manhattan Island from Indians is a cultural misunderstanding. In 1626 the director of the Dutch settlement, Peter Minuit, traded sixty guilders worth of goods with the Lenni Lenape people, which they would have accepted as gifts in exchange for allowing the settlers to occupy the land. Though Native Americans had a communal conception of property, they had no conception of a fee simple.

==== Pocahontas ====
The story told by John Smith of his rescue by the daughter of Chief Powhatan, Pocahontas, is generally thought by historians to be a fabrication. Pocahontas was most likely eleven or twelve at the time, and this popular tale of the "Indian princess" and Smith's story changed over many retellings.

The story of Pocahontas and Native American women was established in American mainstream culture through the 1995 and 1998 Disney movies. Before these movies, Native American women were not commonly in the media and were mainly not named. These images were used to represent exoticism of the “Indian princess”, the opposing nature of the princess and the princes, and that they are not to be shown together. This is to preserve the image that white men had of native women being a representation of the virgin land and not showing that they may have loyalty to native men. Through these stories, Pocahontas became a representation of and a justification of white U.S. dominance and how and why the Native Americans welcomed the fate brought to them.

The story told through Disney’s movies perpetuates stereotypes and inaccuracies. Beginning with her appearance and attire, Disney resembled her to be like an Asian Barbie instead of based on an old engraving made of Pocahontas. Then with historical inaccuracies in the second movie, Pocahontas finds out that John Smith died and sails to England as a diplomat. However, historically, she is married to a white man named John Rolfe as a part of a deal to leave the colony. She was then converted to Christianity and had her named changed to Rebecca. Then Pocahontas, John, and her child sailed to England to raise money for the colony. She died of illness in her early 20s. In the movie she was well treated in British society. Historically, this is probably true but primarily out of curiosity not acceptance. At this time interracial marriages were not accepted in British culture. They were in Native American culture and seen as an asset of knowledge.

Disney attempted to show Pocahontas as a strong woman who advocates for her culture. Some say that this was not the result of the movies and that instead they perpetuate harmful images to younger girls. This is seen with the idea that native women are seductive and a sacrificial virgin. It also highlights the societal obligations and roles of women to stay with their village or tribe, self-sacrifice, motherhood, etc.

=== Cultural and ethnic misconceptions ===
The Media Awareness Network of Canada (MNet) has prepared several statements about the portrayals of American Indians, First Nations of Canada, and Alaskan Natives in the media. Westerns and documentaries have tended to portray Natives in stereotypical terms: the wise elder, the aggressive drunk, the Indian princess, the loyal sidekick, the obese and impoverished. These images have become known across North America. Stereotyped issues include simplistic characterizations, romanticizing of Native culture, and stereotyping by omission—showing American Indians in a historical rather than modern context.

There is also the outdated stereotype that American Indians and Alaskan Natives live on reservations when in fact only about 25% do, and a slight majority now live in urban areas.

There is an assumption that Indians somehow have an intuitive knowledge of their culture and history when the degree of such knowledge varies greatly depending upon the family and community connections of each individual.

=== Indigenous women ===
Native American and First Nations women are frequently sexually objectified and are often stereotyped as being promiscuous. Such misconceptions led to murder, rape, and violence against Native American or First Nations women and girls by mostly non-Native settlers.

An Algonquin word, the term "squaw" is now widely deemed offensive due to its use for hundreds of years in a derogatory context. However, there remain more than a thousand locations in the U.S. that incorporate the term in its name.

=== Indigenous men and sports mascotry ===
In early colonial writings, the most common portrayal of Native men came in the form of what Robert Berkhofer calls "savage images of the Indian as not only hostile but depraved." In later times, particularly under the influence of Jean-Jacques Rousseau's idea of the noble savage, Native American men were portrayed by European sources as fierce warriors that Euro-American writers called braves. Berkhofer summarizes this idea as follows:

friendly, courteous, and hospitable to the initial invaders of his lands and to all Whites so long as the latter honored the obligations presumed to be mutually entered into with the tribe. Along with handsomeness of physique and physiognomy went great stamina and endurance. Modest in attitude if not always in dress, the noble Indian exhibited great calm and dignity in bearing, conversation, and even under torture. Brave in combat, he was tender in love for family and children.

The word "brave" often appeared in school sports teams' names until such team names fell into disfavor in the later 20th century. Many school team names have been revised to reflect current sensibilities, though professional teams such as American football's Kansas City Chiefs, baseball's Atlanta Braves, and ice hockey's Chicago Blackhawks continue. Some controversial upper-level Native American team mascots such as Chief Noc-A-Homa and Chief Illiniwek have been discontinued, while some such as Chief Osceola and Renegade remain. A controversy over the Fighting Sioux nickname and logo was resolved in 2012.

There have been issues with the continuation of professional team names and mascots especially in the Washington Redskins name controversy. In 2013, President Obama and NBC sportscaster Bob Costas voiced their objection to the name. After a petition, the Trademark and Trial Appeal Board ordered the cancellation of six federal trademark registrations in 2014. The Redskins appealed this ruling. The team was renamed the Washington Football Team in 2020, and in 2022 was renamed again as the Washington Commanders.

=== Substance use ===
Because of the high frequency of American Indian alcoholism, it is sometimes used stereotypically when portraying them. As with most groups, the incidence of substance use is related to issues of poverty and mental distress, both of which may sometimes be in part the result of racial stereotyping and discrimination. This stereotype became most prominent in the mid to late twentieth century when alcoholism became the number one cause of death according to the Indian Health Services (IHS). Reports from the mid-1980s state that this was the time period when the IHS began to primarily target the treatment of alcoholism over its past treatments of infectious diseases. Treatment for substance use disorders by Native Americans is more effective when it is community-based, and addresses the issues of cultural identification.

=== Ecology-affiliated stereotypes ===
One named stereotype with affiliation to ecology is the "Noble Savage" stereotype. When referring to American Indians as "Noble Savages", it is implied that these individuals have acquired a special kinship with their "land, water, and wildlife". Furthermore, this stereotype implicitly states that American Indians do not allow themselves or their environment to be corrupted by commercialization or industrialization and that they strive to preserve their environment and keep it untouched. This stereotype has stemmed from the long-term enthrallment many non-natives have had with this particular minority group, causing American Indians to be viewed as "objects of reverence and fascination".

Kat Anderson's book, Tending the wild: Native American Knowledge and the Management of California's Natural Resources, delves into the "hunter-gatherer" stereotype which describes survival solely on hunting animals and gathering of berries and other plants. The author attempts to break this stereotype by illustrating the varied ways Indigenous peoples of California tended and supported their environment. California Natives have utilized methods, such as effective harvesting, controlled burning, and selectively pruning, in order to maintain their environment and keep many plant and animal species flourishing. Through the book, Anderson wanted to accurately spread the ecological knowledge of California natives to shed light on the impact these groups have had on surrounding wildlife areas.

== Inuit stereotypes ==
Inuit, often referred to as Eskimos (which many see as derogatory), are usually depicted dressed in parkas, paddling kayaks, which the Inuit invented, carving out trinkets, living in igloos, fishing with a harpoon, hunting whales, traveling by sleigh and huskies, eating cod liver oil, and the men are called Nanook from the documentary Nanook of the North. Eskimo children may have a seal for a best friend.

Eskimos are sometimes shown rubbing noses together in greeting ritual, referred to as Eskimo kissing in Western culture, and only loosely based on an authentic Inuit practice known as kunik. They are also often depicted surrounded by polar bears or walruses.

== Effect of stereotyping ==
Stereotypes harm both the victims and those that perpetuate them, with effects on society at large. Victims suffer emotional distress: anger, frustration, insecurity, and feelings of hopelessness. Most of all, Indian children exposed at an early age to these mainstream images internalize the stereotypes paired with the images, resulting in lower self-esteem, contributing to all of the other problems faced by American Indians. Stereotypes become discrimination when the assumptions of being more prone to violence and alcoholism limit job opportunities. This leads directly to Indians being viewed less stable economically, making it more difficult for those that have succeeded to fully enjoy the benefits in the same way that non-Indians do, such as obtaining credit. For those that maintain them, stereotypes prevent a more accurate view of Indians and the history of the United States.

Research also demonstrates the harm done to society by stereotyping of any kind. Two studies examined the effect of exposure to an American Indian sports mascot on the tendency to endorse stereotypes of a different minority group. A study was first done at the University of Illinois and then replicated at The College of New Jersey with the same results. Students were given a paragraph to read about Chief Illiniwek adapted from the University of Illinois' official website, while the control group was given a description of an arts center. In both studies, the students exposed to the sports mascot were more likely to express stereotypical views of Asian-Americans. Although Chief Illiniwek was described only in terms of positive characteristics (as a respectful symbol, not a mascot), the stereotyping of Asian-Americans included negative characteristics, such as being "socially inept". This was indicative of a spreading effect; exposure to any stereotypes increased the likelihood of stereotypical thinking.

In Alabama, at a game between the Pinson Valley High School "Indians" and McAdory High School, the latter team displayed a banner using a disparaging reference to the Trail of Tears for which the principal of the school apologized to Native Americans, stated that the cheerleader squad responsible would be disciplined and that all students would be given a lesson on the actual history of the Trail of Tears. Native Americans responded that it was an example of the continuing insensitivity and stereotyping of Indians in America. A similar sign was displayed in Tennessee by the Dyersburg Trojans when they played the Jackson Northside Indians.

The effect that stereotyping has had on Indigenous women is one of the main reasons why non-Indigenous people commit violent crimes of hate towards First Nations women and girls. Because Aboriginal women have been associated with images of the "Indian princess" and "Squaw" some non-Indigenous people believe that Aboriginal women are dirty, promiscuous, overtly sexualized, which makes these women vulnerable to violent assaults. Colonial culture has been foundation of these stereotypes creating a relationship of violence and hatred, which justifies the treatment of First Nations peoples to this day.

== Film ==
=== Modern perpetuation of stereotypes ===
The mainstream media makes a lot of movies that play along with stereotypes; while accurate portrayals may be critically acclaimed they are not often made or widely distributed.

=== Overcoming stereotypes ===
In the 1980s and 1990s, the Canadian Broadcasting Corporation (CBC) made efforts to improve the portrayals of Aboriginal people in its television dramas. Spirit Bay, The Beachcombers, North of 60 and The Rez used Native actors to portray their own people, living real lives and earning believable livelihoods in identifiable parts of the country.

Imagining Indians is a 1992 documentary film produced and directed by American Indian filmmaker Victor Masayesva, Jr. (Hopi). The documentary attempts to reveal the misrepresentation of Indigenous American Indian culture and tradition in Classical Hollywood films by interviews with different Indigenous Native American actors and extras from various tribes throughout the United States.

=== 21st century ===
Reel Injun is a 2009 Canadian documentary film directed by Cree filmmaker Neil Diamond, Catherine Bainbridge, and Jeremiah Hayes that explores the portrayal of American Indians in film. Reel Injun is illustrated with excerpts from classic and contemporary portrayals of Native people in Hollywood movies and interviews with filmmakers, actors and film historians, while director Diamond travels across the United States to visit iconic locations in motion picture as well as American Indian history.

Reel Injun explores many stereotypes about natives in film, from the Noble savage to the Drunken Indian. It profiles such figures as Iron Eyes Cody, an Italian American who reinvented himself as a Native American on-screen. The film also explores Hollywood's practice of using Italian Americans and American Jews to portray Indians in the movies and reveals how some Native American actors made jokes in their native tongue on screen when the director thought they were simply speaking gibberish.

Inventing the Indian is a 2012 BBC documentary first broadcast on 28 October on BBC 4 exploring the stereotypical view of Native Americans in the United States in cinema and literature.

The American animated series Molly of Denali, which premiered in 2019, features protagonists, actors, and co-creators who are Alaskan Native, with the goal of educating children about informational text as well as debunking Native stereotypes. The show has been celebrated as "the nation's first widely distributed children's program featuring an Alaska Native as the lead character."

The other animated series Spirit Rangers, which premiered on Netflix in 2022, also features all-Native American protagonists, casts and writers, aiming to educate children about the culture of both Chumash and Cowlitz peoples and debunking ethnic stereotypes.

== See also ==
- Code name Geronimo controversy
- Improved Order of Red Men
- Indian giver
- Native Americans in popular culture, non-Native portrayal of Native Americans
  - List of fictional Native Americans
  - List of films featuring colonialism
  - List of sports team names and mascots derived from indigenous peoples
    - Chief Wahoo
  - List of college sports team names and mascots derived from Indigenous peoples
  - List of trademarks featuring Native Americans
  - Mardi Gras Indians
  - Native Americans in children's literature
  - Portrayal of Native Americans in film
    - Reel Injun, documentary about Native portrayals in film
- Noble savage
- Playing Indian (1998), nonfiction book by Philip J. Deloria (Standing Rock Sioux)
- Racial profiling
- Racism against Native Americans in the United States
- Stereotypes of groups within the United States
- Stereotype threat
- Vanishing Indian
