= Indian princess =

Term for stereotypical and inaccurate representation of Native American women

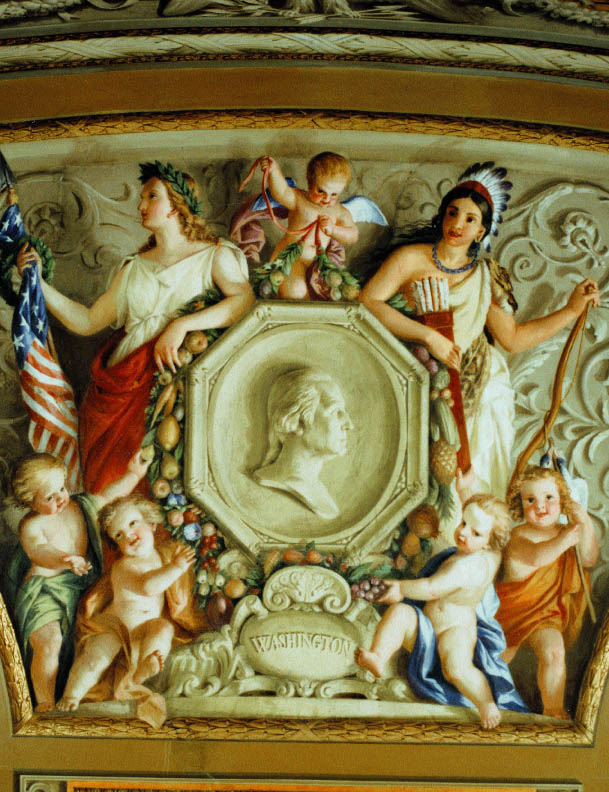
An Indian princess, on right, in a fresco at the U.S. Capitol Building

The Indian princess or Native American princess is usually a stereotypical and inaccurate representation of a Native American or other Indigenous woman of the Americas. The term "princess" was often mistakenly applied to the daughters of tribal chiefs or other community leaders by early American colonists who mistakenly believed that Indigenous people shared the European system of royalty. This inaccurate portrayal has continued in popular animation, with characters that conform to European standards of beauty, with the most famous misrepresentation being that of Pocahontas (Matoaka). Frequently, the "Indian Princess" stereotype is paired with the "Pocahontas theme" in which the princess "offers herself to a captive Christian knight, a prisoner of her father, and after rescuing him, she is converted to Christianity and lives with him in his native land." This depiction misrepresents the events of Matoaka's life. The phrase "Indian princess", when used in this way, is often considered to be a derogatory term, a type of racial slur, and is deemed offensive by Native Americans.

One exception to this rule is that at some Native American powwows and other types of pageants, some competition titles and awards for girls or young women might include the name "Princess". This usage is not accepted by all, and there are calls to discontinue its usage and replace it with "more culturally relevant and accurate nomenclature."

== Background ==
=== Origin of the Indian princess stereotype ===
The print cultures of European Americans, "since 1575", portrayed the American Indian woman as a symbol of the mysterious new world and freedom. In paintings and engravings, North America was personified by the symbol of the Indian princess, who wore a feathered headdress, gripped a bow and arrow, and was often depicted in pursuit of freedom. Sometimes, the Indian princess was pictured leading troops of American colonists into battle. In later years, she could be seen cloaked in the American flag. This appropriated symbol of an Indigenous woman relied not only on ideas of freedom, power, and wildness but, paradoxically, loyalty to the white man. In Calvin's Case (1608) and additional acts by English monarchs, Native American communities were considered tribal nations in jus gentium, international law. During the seventeenth century, coronations performed by Native Americans wed royal allegiance with ritual delegations of authority to tribal leaders, as well as to mediators between two or more tribal nations in conflict. An example of the latter ritual was the Dish With One Spoon. These coronations, however, increasingly became associated with the ebbing of tribal sovereignty during the eighteenth century. These themes can be seen in modern media renditions of the Indian princess; for example, in portrayals of Pocahontas, who has been defined by her noble savage connection to nature and her debunked rescue of John Smith. Though the image of the "grand and liberated" Indian princess was commonly used to epitomize America; other icons and accounts depicting and denigrating Native and indigenous women as savages and squaws were still publicized and accepted.

=== Early popular representation ===
Native Americans were frequent subjects in popular 1860s "dime" novels. Two well-known novels of that period being Mahaska: The Indian Princess (Stephens 1863) and The Indian Queen (Stephens 1864). The covers often depicted Native American women with "darker complexion, distinct dress (belted, fringed and ornately decorated), moccasins, leggings, and loose hair with feather headgear" with the feathered headgear being quasi-Caribbean. The popularity in literature helped in the rise of popularity in productions like the Buffalo Bill's Combination Shows where an Indian Princess, He-Nu-Kaw, was seen on advertising posters. The show typically performed Western melodramas with white people playing the role of Native Americans. By 1877 Bill was actively recruiting Native Americans from reservations to "play themselves" but it is still unknown whether or not He-Nu-Kaw was actually a Native woman. Either way, her character representation was that of an "Indian Princess" which was further reinforced by the portrayal of Native women by white women in other theater shows, advertisements, and literature illustrations. In the 19th-century photography books on American Indians, white women are often shown wearing stereotypical "Indian Princess" clothes.

=== Historic roles of Native American women ===
In many Native American cultures, women of all statuses are traditionally in charge of the home and agricultural sector of tribal life. While roles vary depending on geographical region and culture, historically, women have cleared fields, planted and harvested crops, hunted and fished, and providing a great deal of the food for their communities. This is in addition to managing food distribution, owning their homes and, in many communities, sitting on war councils. This proximity to nature is reflected and often exaggerated in depictions of "Indian princesses" in non-Native media. To the mainstream, the Native woman's symbolization of American land and agriculture also gave rise to her as a symbol of fertility. Twentieth-century poet Hart Crane describes Pocahontas as “'a woman, ripe, waiting to be taken'” by the white man. Native women also played integral roles in the fur trade, acting as interpreters. In some tribes, Native women of higher status have historically participated and still do participate in councils, elect chiefs, serve as chiefs, and participate in battles.

As Native American life continued to evolve alongside colonial culture, Native women gradually played a larger role in Euro-American life. Recruited by settlers as interpreters, guides, craftspeople, and instructors some Native women were assimilated (or were forced to assimilate) into colonial society, losing their connections to family and culture. Native women of higher rank, such as the daughters of chiefs or other community leaders, were at times pressured to marry white settlers in order to form alliances. Though settlers assumed the Native women would see these alliances as, at the very least, friendship (y/n Algonquian: netompaug), encompassing both fictive/non-fictive kinship in such associations, and that they would appreciate being accepted into Euro-American society, many of these Native women were still referred to derogatorily as squaws, despite this supposed elevation of class. Additionally, these marriages were usually for the purpose of white families claiming Indian land through forced kinship.

These Native women's assimilation into colonial society is a key component of many depictions of "Indian princesses" in historical depictions all the way up through current media, This is often conveyed through the religious conversion of the Native woman/"Indian princess", portrayals of the Native woman and white men in close proximity, and illustrations of the Native woman with a skin tone lighter than other Natives.

== Media representation ==
=== Common characteristics ===
Characteristics of the "Indian Princess" stereotype can be seen in said characters relationship with the white man and specific behaviors or traits that would make her the idealized Indian woman. The depiction of Native American women in media is important because it may be the only insight the mainstream audience has to the lifestyle of a culture that is generally hidden from the public. The Princess stereotype thus serves as a model for the assimilation of Indigenous people into a more "civilized" society. She gains this "privilege" by "allowing" the white man into her territory, even if she is actually being taken prisoner or raped. Native author Denise K. Lajimodiere elaborates on this idea of the Indian Princess being an aid to the white man by claiming that these captive "Princesses" must help non-Indians in their conquest against their own people in order to achieve a likeness to their European counterparts Her aid to the white man is typically portrayed as being done out of love and 'Christian sympathy' as many "Indian Princesses" are portrayed as Christian converts. Because of this, the Indian Princess is seen as a sidekick to the white hero. John M. Coward asserts that their relationship is based on a power dynamic that shows the colonizers as heroes to a group of "savages" because the colonists had helped them transition from barbarism to a "refined" society. Typically, the Indian Princess serves as a symbol of triumph for white men in colonizing and asserting their power over Native people

"Indian Princesses" are considered by the promoters of this stereotype and narrative to be the idealized Indian woman. They are commonly depicted with lighter skin and follow other European Beauty standards. Coward claims that Indian women who then follow this standard and show signs of a charming feminine beauty will become the woman that men lust after. Their characterization isolates them from typical Native American women and portrays them as an extension of their white counterparts. This emphasizes the “otherness” of Native American women who will be denigrated as squaws if they don't adopt these European beauty standards. The decision for Native American women to become an Indian Princess or squaw depends on their relationship with men. The Indian Princess acts as a symbol of the success of these colonizers. The “otherness” of Native Americans is combated when she acts as a medium between these two cultures.

=== Tiger Lily ===
Tiger Lily is an "Indian princess" character from the fictional "Piccaninny Tribe" in Peter and Wendy by J. M. Barrie. In the book, she is captured by Captain Hook and Mr. Smee and is rescued by Peter Pan. She has a limited command of the English language and speaks in stereotypical, halting, broken English. Her most famous depiction is the 1953 Disney film adaptation. In an early version of the manuscript, Tiger Lily plays out a rape fantasy by asking Peter Pan what would happen if he attacked her in the woods to which the other Indians replied that “she him’s squaw”. Tiger Lily is depicted as both a sexualized figure and a strong warrior in Peter Pan. The depiction of Tiger Lily stands in stark contrast to the female figure of Wendy. While many of the female characters appear to desire the affections of Peter Pan, Wendy, the older sister in the Darling family, is presented as a pure, motherly, and talkative figure, often associated with the color white. Conversely, Tiger Lily is depicted as both ethnic and quiet, but not embodying the stereotypical role of a woman. Although Peter Pan saves both Wendy and Tiger Lily in the story, Tiger Lily promises to protect him from the threat of pirates in return. Tiger Lily is brave in the face of fear and possesses important knowledge of the forest. In Warner's 2015 Pan, Tiger Lily was played by a Caucasian actress, Rooney Mara. This generated a vast amount of controversy around the whitewashing of Native American representations, with thousands protesting the role. In an interview with The Telegraph in 2016, Rooney Mara said she regretted her role and said that she could "understand why people were upset and frustrated".

=== Pocahontas ===
The Baptism of Pocahontas, engraving by Charles Burt based on John G. Chapman's painting

In the early 20th century, Native American women often portrayed Pocahontas on-stage during World's Fairs. For instance, Pamunkey women assumed the role of Pocahontas during the 1907 Jamestown Exposition. Spectator perceptions and conceptions of the certainty of these representations were often fielded, and dictated by, Native Americans women, even if gilded wage labor and monetary exchange initially ensnared such women in boom-and-bust economies.

The Disney character Pocahontas, eponymous star of the 1995 Disney film is the most famous modern representation of an Indian princess. She has been inducted to the ranks of the Disney Princess franchise. Critical reception of her character has panned her overly sexualized portrayal, especially as the real Pocahontas was "a child of ten years old" during the events fictionalized by Disney. Her appearance was modeled on a number of sources, including Eskimo-French Canadian/Cree actress Irene Bedard, who provided the character's speaking voice, Powhatan historian Shirley Little Dove Custolow, and her sister Debbie White Dove, white American model Christy Turlington, and Dyna Taylor, a then-21-year-old senior at the California Institute of the Arts, who was used as the model for the character's face. Taylor, who is of Filipino descent, was paid about $200 for four modeling sessions, saying, "I work across from a Disney Store. When they show the promos, certain expressions are really familiar." The fictional Pocahontas is portrayed as being different from the rest of the Powhatan Confederacy, particularly as it relates to her relationship with John Smith, the European character she falls in love with. Unlike her violent and unfriendly tribe, Pocahontas is gentle and loving. She represents the “noble savage” in her willingness to defy the stereotypical traits assigned to indigenous people, instead embracing traits of the colonists, specifically her adventurous spirit which allows her to turn her back on her past and embrace new opportunities.

== Indian princess costume ==
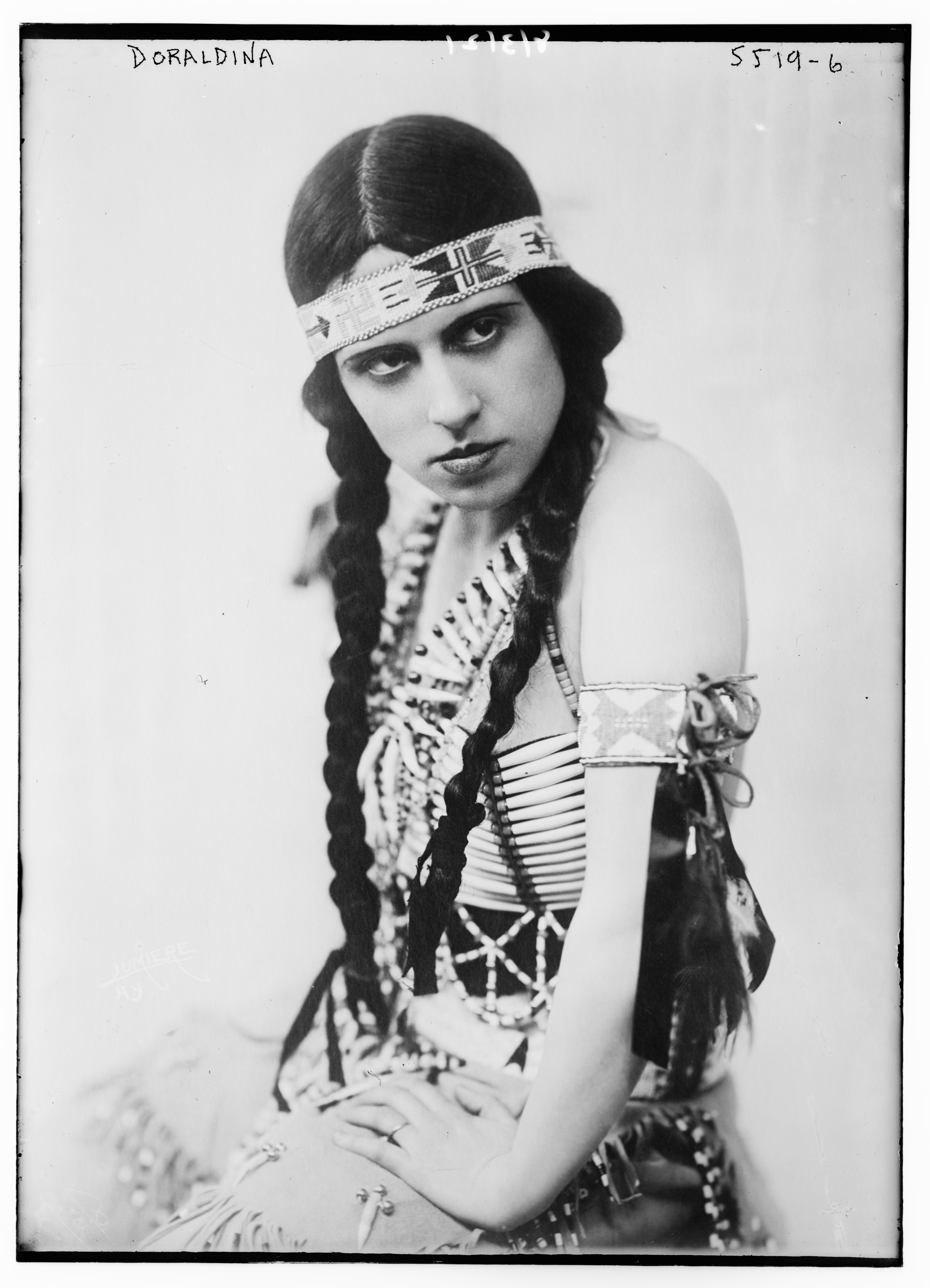
A stereotypical Indian princess look from 1921

Dressing up in a stereotypical Native American costume, for various reasons, is an American practice that goes back to colonial times, and has been analyzed by historians and scholars such as Philip J. Deloria. In his Playing Indian, Deloria concluded that the practice is commonly a quest for National identity on the part of settlers, while also denigrating, dismissing, and making invisible real, contemporary Indian people. During The Boston Tea Party, colonists dressed up as Indians by wearing feathers, blankets, and drawing on their faces with black soot. They then boarded an East India Company merchantmen and threw the chests of tea onboard into the Boston harbor.

Portraying an Indian princess is a form of playing Indian. Many non-Indigenous people believe that dressing up as an Indian princess is innocent, inoffensive, and not only harmless but a fun and personally empowering activity. However, the cultural appropriation of Native traditional dress (or the wearing of degrading costumes that non-Natives believe resemble traditional Native dress) is often viewed as offensive because it ignores the deep cultural and religious significance of traditional Native American regalia. These settler costumes also routinely sexualize Native American women in particular, though men are sexualized as well. In contrast, traditional regalia is usually modest in style and there are protocols around its construction, how and when it is worn, and by whom. Some of the items in particular indicate an earned social and ceremonial status in the community, and are considered sacred.

A neologism for those who misappropropriate Native American identity, especially if done on an ongoing basis, is pretendian. It is considered an extreme form of cultural appropriation, sometimes also referred to as ethnic fraud or race shifting. One of the most common claims among pretendians, or from those trying to excuse dressing up as Native Americans, is that one of their non-Native ancestors was actually a "Cherokee Princess".

== Uses by Native Americans ==
=== Native American stage performers ===
Sarah Winnemucca, a Northern Paiute educator, translator, author, and activist, was a well-known performer who was billed as "an Indian princess" for some of her stage and screen performances. She played many roles after she came to the northeastern United States in 1883, continuing to speak out about Native American rights and treaties, in addition to performing in theatrical roles. She was at times referred to as a “Paiute princess” or "Princess Winnemucca", despite the fact that the Paiute do not have Princesses, nor would that be her status in the tribe even if they had that kind of leadership structure. Carolyn Sorisio argues that by using the English term “princess” to refer to herself, she claimed a type of power that the press was able to recognize and attribute to her and the Paiute nation. Her role as a "princess" served to “legitimize in non-Native discourse Northern Paiutes’ political identity”. The question of her legitimacy is further contested in her costuming.

Sorisio argues that Winnemucca's inaccurate costuming suggests compliance with non-Native desires, as expressed in the Indian princess stereotype. Joanna Cohan Scherer argues that Winnemucca exhibits a "Pocahontas complex" as she dresses in clothing that is not representative of a Paiute woman - dressing in cloth rather than buckskin and in “elaborate nontraditional costumes”. Some critique her actions as a form of complacency in colonialism. Winnemucca reportedly responded to the issue by stating that her lack of materials needed to recreate traditional regalia would be understood by the audience because it is a performance, and that as an "Indian princess", she used the performances to reflect presentations of herself and Native Americans regardless.

=== Pow wow pageants ===
"Princess" is sometimes included in the titles some girls and young women compete for in pageants held at pow wows. However, contrary to typical beauty pageants that judge based on physical appearance, Indigenous women who compete in Indian princess pageants are primarily judged on how well they preserve, practice and promote traditional Indigenous cultural values and represent their community, and not just on how they look. Emphasis is also placed on their skills in traditional arts such as the designing and creation of their regalia, and their talents for traditional dances.

The term "Princess" was never a part of traditional Native culture, however, and there are now calls by participants to change the term. New York State Fair Indian Princess, Yanenowi 'She Guards the Corn' Logan (Seneca Nation) has dedicated her platform "to propose the retirement of the Indian Princess title in lieu of a more culturally appropriate way to celebrate and honor young Indigenous women." She continues,

Being called an Indian Princess, although a position of honor, can also be uncomfortable in predominately white spaces.

I had the awkward experience of being called princess all day at work this summer by my white colleagues once I shared the news. Although I know their congratulations were well-intentioned, I couldn’t help but feel tokenized. I knew that I was the only Native girl they knew and now they could tell their friends and families that they knew a real Indian Princess.

The issue isn’t just a matter of discomfort with the term but the stereotypes, microaggressions and historical inaccuracies embedded in it.

We remain rooted in culture and traditions that are ours; we must peel away the false pretenses of Indian Princess nomenclature. We have no need for notions of a Disney-fied, romanticized, abstract Princess ideal.

I don’t want to dishonor or disrespect past princesses, but bring us forward with more culturally relevant and accurate nomenclature.

==== Indian princess pageants throughout history ====
In 1940 Ella Deloria, a Yankton Sioux scholar, produced a pageant named The Life Story of a People for the Native Americans of Robeson Country and surrounding areas. It was part of a morale and community-building effort that is also now recognized by Native American scholars as an important effort toward the accurate representation of Native Americans in theatre. It was supported by the Dakota Indian Foundation and had since become a tradition. Lumbee Indians, the ninth largest tribe in the United States, has referenced the pageants done by Deloria within their historical narrative, demonstrating the pageants’ “contribut[ion] to the persistence and revitalization of […] Indian identity through narrative and performance”. Deloria's pageantry began with the assimilation and accommodation of Euramerican institutions but later developed into an exploration of “Indian identities under siege” where Native American people performed themselves and acted out their stories in her pageants. According to David Glassberg, pageantry characteristically has a “theme of […] keeping pace with modernity [and] retaining a particular version of their traditions”, an effort that Native American pageantry has since been able to accomplish. According to Deloria, the purpose of her pageants was to “reclaim, with pride, the cultural resources of the past” through theatre. American Indian scholars agree that pageantry was able to reclaim the historical tellings of history that had thus been juxtaposed by media's representation of the past. Similar reclamations occurred in South American theatrical productions that navigated different ethnic and racial categories, particularly in the Andes. A child actress with one indigenous parent would be categorized as mestiza, rather than Aymaran or Quechuan. But, in La Paz and elsewhere, the child could also perform and "la figura del ‘indio’ " as a semiotic reclamation of indigeneity for herself, her indigenous parent, and said parent's community from such racial and ethnic categories.

Feminist writers like Wendy Kozol make note of beauty pageant winners who exemplify Native American tradition within the Euro-American cultural context. According to Kozol, Viola Noah a runner-up for the Choctaw Princess award in the 1973 Labor Day gathering stepped away from the typical photo rendering of Native American princesses. Previous winners were typically shown with traditional Native American attire in natural settings for an ‘“authentic”’ rendering of Native Americans. This, however, is interpreted by feminist writers like Kozol as more of a suggestion that Native Americans are “living relics of the past” (Kozol 70) because it suggests a society that has been untouched by time or colonization. Kozol calls the photo of Noah a “competing form […] of affiliation” because she wears traditional attire with modern American elements within the photo. She explains that Native tribes have often used pageants and parades as cultural practices to keep the tradition alive. Anita Ahenakew, 1981 Saskatchewan Indian Princess is identified by her community as being a multiple, medal winning Judoka, a practitioner of Judo, also breaking the stereotype.

==== Miss Indian World ====
The Miss Indian World contest began in 1984. The contest is held each year during the Gathering of Nations powwow in Albuquerque, New Mexico. The contest is the largest and most prestigious of its kind.

Requirements for participation

- Must be a woman of Native or Indigenous descent
- Must be between 18 and 25 years of age
- Must be affiliated with a tribe
- Must be single
- Must never have been married
- Must not cohabitate with an intimate companion
- Must not have, nor ever had, children
- Must conduct themselves morally and refrain from drugs, alcohol, smoking, profane language, and intimate public displays of affection with a boyfriend.

Winners

- 2014 – Taylor Thomas
- 2013 – Kansas K. Begaye
- 2012 – Jessa Rae Growing Thunder
- 2011 – Marjorie Tahbone
- 2010 – Dakota Brant
- 2009 – Brooke Grant
- 2008 – Nicole Alex’aq Colbert
- 2007 – Megan Young
- 2006 – Violet John
- 2005 – Cassie Thomas
- 2004 – Delana Smith
- 2003 – Onawa Lynn Lacy
- 2002 – Tia Smith
- 2001 – Ke Aloha May Cody Alo
- 2000 – Lillian ‘Cepa’ Sparks
- 1999 – Mitzi Tolino
- 1998 – April Whittemore
- 1997 – Shayai Lucero
- 1996 – Andrea Jack
- 1995 – Crystal Pewo
- 1994 – J.C. Lonetree
- 1993 – Gloria Snow
- 1992 – Lanette Asepermy
- 1991 – Janet Saupitty
- 1990 – Lovina Louie
- 1989 – Tammy Deann Billey
- 1988 – Prairie Rose Little Sky
- 1987 (August '87 – April '88 ) – Jovanna Plenty
- 1987 (April '87 – August 8'7) – Celeste Tootoosis
- 1986 – Lisa Ewaulk
- 1985 – Shelly Valdez
- 1984 – Cody High Elk

==== Calgary Stampede Indian Princess ====
The Calgary Stampede Indian Princess contest began in 1964. The Calgary Stampede Indian Princess joins the Calgary Stampede Rodeo Queen and Princesses to complete the Calgary Stampede Rodeo Royalty. While the Calgary Stampede Indian Princess is considered part of the Calgary Stampede Royalty, she has a separate category and competition of her own.

Evelyn Locker (née Eagle Speaker) of the Kainai Nation was the first First Nations woman to participate in and be crowned as Calgary Stampede royalty in 1954. Controversy erupted after Evelyn Eagle Speaker's crowning because she was of Aboriginal descent. The issues surrounding her crowning focused on how she should represent the Calgary Stampede and perform her role as Queen, specifically what kind of clothing she should wear (her traditional regalia or cowgirl gear). Most of the time the Calgary press referred to her as the Indian Princess instead of her rightful title as Rodeo Queen.

Requirements for participation:

- Must be a member of one of the Treaty 7 First Nations
- Must be between 18 and 25 years old
- Must never have been married, lived common-law, or have had a child
- Must agree not to marry, live common-law, or have a child during her reign
- Competency in a native language is an asset
- Riding ability is required

Judgement criteria:

- Application package
- Personal interview
- Public speaking presentation
- Dance
- Interpersonal communication
- Horsemanship and riding ability

== See also ==
- Cherokee descent
- Índia pega no laço
