= Custer Died for Your Sins =

1969 book by Vine Deloria, Jr.

- Cover of the first edition
- Author: Vine Deloria Jr.
- Genre: Non-fiction
- Publisher: Macmillan
- Publication date: 1969

Custer Died for Your Sins: An Indian Manifesto is a 1969 non-fiction book by the lawyer, professor and writer Vine Deloria Jr. The book was noteworthy for its relevance to the Alcatraz-Red Power Movement and other activist organizations, such as the American Indian Movement, which was beginning to expand. Deloria's book encouraged better use of federal funds aimed at helping Native Americans. Vine Deloria, Jr. presents Native Americans in a humorous light, devoting an entire chapter to Native American humor. Custer Died for Your Sins was significant in its presentation of Native Americans as a people who were able to retain their tribal society and morality, while existing in the modern world.

== Content summary ==
The book consists of eleven essays and is critical of aid organizations, churches, and the US government, for their efforts to "help" Native Americans, which often hinder rather than help progress. Deloria also objects to the efforts of anthropologists to understand Native Americans, devoting millions of dollars to the study of individual tribes that would help the tribes advance. The book advocates Native American religion, and encourages church groups to lay aside their theological differences and help the tribes whose members they sought to convert.

=== Essays ===
==== Indians Today: The Real and the Unreal ====
Deloria pointed out numerous beliefs and attitudes that affect Native American-White relations. He noted that many whites claim Indian ancestry, usually by a grandmother who was an Indian Princess and wryly noted that tribes were evidently entirely female for the first 300 years of white occupation. The essay lists many other myths about Native Americans.

==== Laws and Treaties ====
While noting that U.S. Presidents continually stressed the need to meet its treaty obligations with foreign powers, they have had over 400 treaties with Native American tribes and have yet to meet their obligations on any of them. Deloria saw the Vietnam war as just another example of the lack of integrity in the American government.

==== The Disastrous Policy of Termination ====
This chapter covered the termination policy of the 1950s, designed to assimilate tribal members into white society. Deloria believed that this was just another way for whites to obtain Native American land.

==== Anthropologists and Other Friends ====
Deloria recommended that Native Americans not cooperate with anthropologists, believing that they exploited Native Americans in order to further their own academic careers. He stated that they compiled useless knowledge and noted that not one anthropologist stepped forward during termination hearings. He stated that "behind each policy and program with which Indians are plagued, if traced completely back to its origin, stands the anthropologist."

==== Missionaries and the Religious Vacuum ====
The role of Christian churches was also attacked, with Deloria advocating a return to traditional religion and an expansion of the Native American Church.

==== Government Agencies ====
Deloria advocated a restructuring of the Bureau of Indian Affairs (BIA), with more discretionary funds available to the tribes. He also recommended moving BIA from the Department of the Interior to the Department of Commerce.

==== Indian Humor ====
This is the most often quoted section of the book. Deloria noted that humor was a critical aspect of social control in tribal relationships, as an alternate means of pointing out flaws and errors without a direct confrontation that would affect the dignity of the accused. He also noted that humor was an essential part of a tribe's survival, preventing them from going to extremes.

==== The Red and the Black ====
Deloria noted the similarities of the oppression of both Native Americans and African Americans, but also pointed out differences between the two. While oppression against African Americans typically excluded them from white society, oppression against Native Americans typically involved the forced inclusion into white society. Deloria believed that this was due to the white desire to appropriate and exploit Native American lands and resources. He also noted that this is one of the reasons that Native Americans did not participate fully in civil rights efforts in the 1960s, believing that the liberals did not understand Native American nationalism.

==== The Problem of Indian Leadership ====
Deloria addresses the lack of central leadership of Native Americans and the trouble that has caused. He compares specifically to the number of leaders seen during the Civil Rights' era and laments at the absence of comparable Native figures.

==== Indians and Modern Society ====
Deloria uses this chapter as a response to those individuals who believe that Native Americans have no place in modern society as they are, with tribalism as the central point of contention. Deloria argues that tribalism is so inherent to the Native identity that it will one day lead them to do things once thought impossible by “Indian and non-Indian alike”.

==== A Redefinition of Indian Affairs ====
In his final chapter Deloria advocates for the end of termination and the start of a new era for American Indians. Deloria reflects the civil rights movement and suggests that it is a spot Natives can find inspiration for their own movement.

== Significance ==
Custer Died for Your Sins: An Indian Manifesto was based on a bumper sticker, and a Native American slogan from the 1960s, "We Shall Overrun." The book was significant at the time of its publication, as the struggle for minority rights was gaining increased attention across the United States. Due to its importance in the Red Power movement, an original copy of the book was displayed in the National Museum of the American Indian's long-term exhibit "Our Lives: Contemporary Life and Identities". The book caused anthropologists to rethink how they approached their studies of Native American tribes. It remains one of the most significant non-fiction books written by a Native American.
