= God Is Red =

1973 book by Vine Deloria, Jr.

God is Red: A Native View of Religion
- Author: Vine Deloria, Jr.
- Language: English
- Publication date: 1973

God is Red: A Native View of Religion, by Vine Deloria, Jr. (Standing Rock Sioux), is a nonfiction book that discusses traditional Native American religious views, particularly their relation to Western Christianity. It also details the hardships faced by Native Americans as their country was quickly flooded with foreigners eager for land and other resources. Deloria links the anthropocentrism of Christian orthodoxy and subsequent American economic philosophies with increasing environmental upheaval. Deloria also explains how religious views are rooted to "place" as opposed to being universal.

The book was first published in 1973, then 1992, and 2003.

== See also ==
- The red road
