= J. F. Burshears =

James Francis "Buck" Burshears (1909 in Swink, Colorado – 1987 in La Junta, Colorado) was the founder of the Koshare Indian Dancers and the troop's Scoutmaster for over half a century. His poem "The Scoutmaster's Prayer" has been an inspiration to thousands of Scouters throughout the world.

The Koshare Indians were formed as a senior project while Burshears was a student at Colorado College. Burshears spearheaded the Koshare Indian Museum, regarded as one of the finest collections of Native American artifacts in the world, housed on the campus of Otero Junior College. The Koshare Indian museum hosts a unique Boy Scout/Explorer program which trains the Scouts in both Indian dance and costumes. The Scouts give dance performances during the summer and also host many other Scout troops passing through the area.

"The Scoutmaster's Prayer" was written during World War II when Burshears had received word of one of his Scouts missing in action. Burshears was scheduled to speak to the group the next day at their annual Christmas party, but he was at a loss for words. By early morning he had completed "The Scoutmaster's Prayer", said to have been "a poem that has become a clear statement of his life's guiding theme". It has been printed in thousands of Koshare booklets and virtually every book or article written about him.
