= Otero College =

Community college in La Junta, Colorado, US

Coordinates: 37°58′18″N 103°32′43″W

- Former names: La Junta Junior College (1941–1949); Otero County Junior College (1949–1956); Otero Junior College (1956–2021)
- Motto: We're Focused on Your Future!
- Type: Public community college
- Established: 1941
- Parent institution: Colorado Community College System
- Academic affiliations: Space-grant
- President: Timothy A. Alvarez
- Students: 959 (fall 2025)
- Location: La Junta, Colorado, United States
- Colors: Blue and white
- Website: www.otero.edu

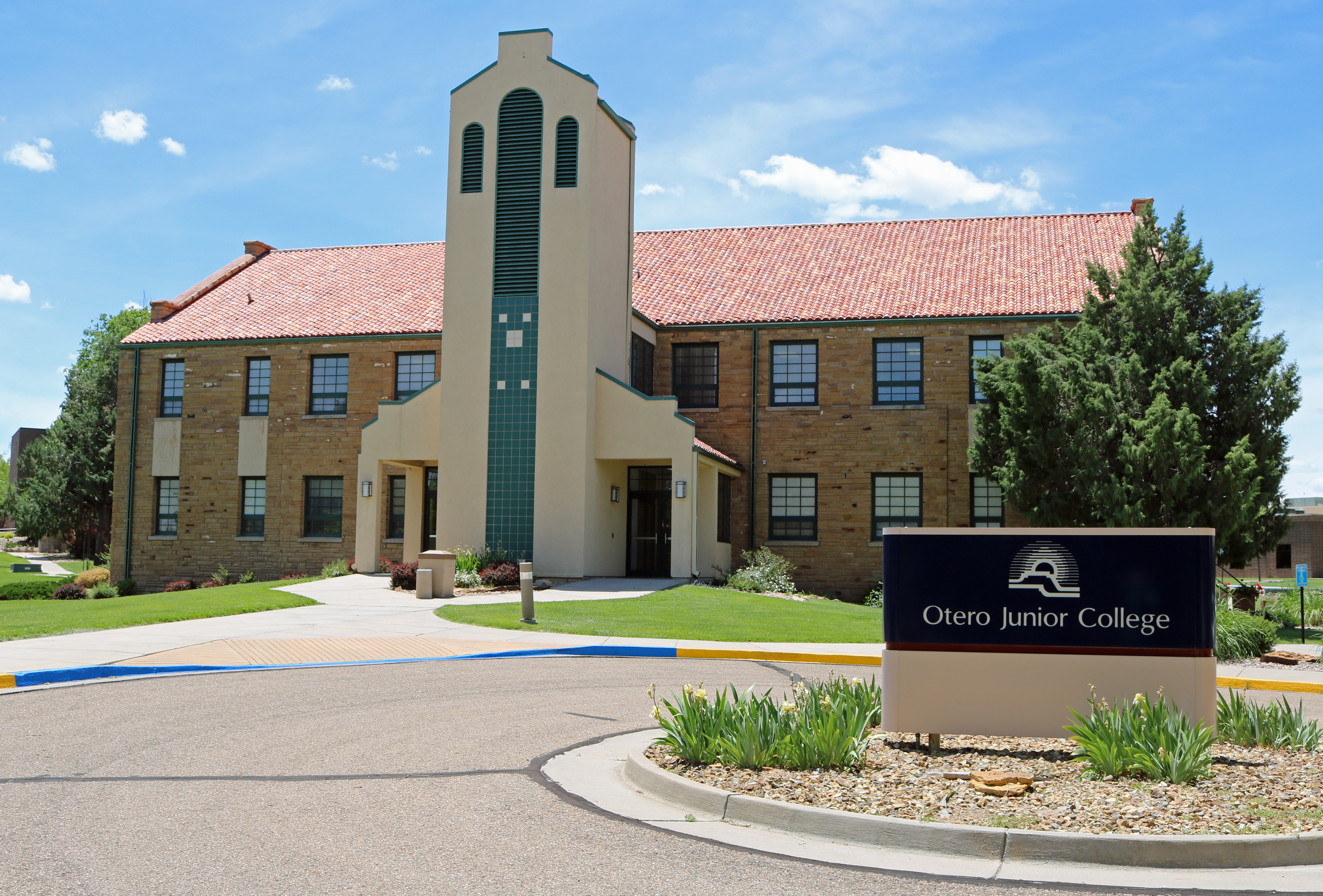
Macdonald Hall

Otero College is a public community college in La Junta, Colorado. In fall 2025, the college had an enrollment of 959 students. Otero's athletic teams, known as the Rattlers, compete in the National Junior College Athletic Association.

== History ==
Otero College was established in 1941 and was named La Junta Junior College. Which was operated by the school district. In 1949, an election was held to consider proposal that the college become an independent unit supported by the county instead. It was approved and the college was renamed as Otero County Junior College. The College changed its name again, to Otero Junior College in 1956. On February 20, 1968, the Otero County Junior College District voted in favor of Otero Junior College joining the state system. The college officially became a state two-year college on July 1, 1968. On May 18, 2021, Colorado's governor signed a law officially changing the college's name from Otero Junior College to Otero College.

== Academics ==
Otero College offers more than thirty academic programs covering a variety of topics including Agriculture Business Management, Cosmetology and Community Health Worker to Nursing, as well as nine Certificate Programs, including Nursing Assistant, Welding, and Law Enforcement, nursing and health programs, including Nursing and Practical Nursing.

== Athletics ==
The Otero Rattlers compete in the Northwest Plains District/Region IX in NJCAA. Otero College compete in men's basketball, baseball, golf, soccer, wrestling, and rodeo. As well as women's basketball, softball, golf, volleyball, soccer, and rodeo.

== Campus ==
Otero College is located on a 40-acre campus on the southern edge of La Junta. The Koshare Indian Museum, featuring a collection of Native American artifacts and a kiva which is a performance space for the Koshare Indian Dancers, is located on the campus of Otero College.

=== Athletic facilities ===
On the Otero College campus, there are two gyms. The McDivitt Center Gym & Fitness Center, which are in the same building. The Fitness Center includes racquetball courts, equipment that can be used to tone certain areas or to build the entire body. The McDivitt Center Gym hosts the Otero College volleyball and basketball events. Lastly, the Auxiliary Gym is another athletic facility on campus, mainly used for wrestling practices or other athletic practices.

=== Academic facilities ===
Macdonald Hall, the first building built on the Otero Campus, now houses the college's administrative offices and is now serving as the Welcome Center for Otero College. The Humanities Center includes music and art classes. Inside the Humanities Center is the Ed Stafford Theater which accommodates musical, theatrical, and presentation events. The Learning Commons includes the library, computers, and other necessities for students while in college. Wheeler Hall and Life Science are part of the same building as the Learning Commons, and includes the science, math, and nursing or other medical classes. In the McDivitt Hall, it includes the agriculture, welding, and cosmetology departments. McBride Hall includes history, business, and the Law Academy programs. Other facilities include the Telescope, Forestry, and Greenhouse facilities.

=== Residences ===
Otero Campus includes the Conley Complex, a suite-style housing, which accommodates up to four students. Wunsch Hall, which is the traditional residence hall, includes two beds, with community bathrooms. The last housing option is the South Site - suite-style which is specifically reserved for Rodeo and Law enforcement students. All three Residences have laundry facilities as well as a lobby with a game room.

== Notable alumni ==
- Darvin Ham, professional basketball player coach
- Brian Shaw, professional strongman competitor
- Clarice Navarro, former Colorado politician
