= Philip J. Deloria =

American historian from Massachusetts (born 1959)

- Born: Philip Joseph Deloria; February 27, 1959 (age 67); United States
- Citizenship: American
- Education: University of Colorado Boulder (BME, MA); Yale University (PhD)
- Occupations: Professor, Historian
- Relatives: Vine Deloria Jr., father; Mary Sully, great-aunt
- Writing career
- Language: English
- Subjects: Native American history, Native American studies
- Notable work: Playing Indian Indians in Unexpected Places Becoming Mary Sully

Philip Joseph Deloria (born February 27, 1959) is an American professor and author of Yankton Dakota descent who specializes in Native American, Western American, and environmental history. He is the author of the award-winning books Playing Indian (1998) and Indians in Unexpected Places (2004), among others. Deloria received his Ph.D. in American Studies from Yale University and currently teaches in the Department of History at Harvard University. In 2021 he was elected to the American Philosophical Society.

== Family background ==
Deloria is direct descendant of the Standing Rock Sioux Tribe and the son of Barbara and Vine Deloria Jr. His father was a scholar, writer, and activist for Native American rights who earned national recognition for his 1969 book, Custer Died for Your Sins: An Indian Manifesto. Philip J. Deloria's paternal great aunt Ella Deloria worked as an ethnologist, and Ella's sister Mary Sully was an artist. Deloria's grandfather, Vine Deloria Sr. and great-grandfather Philip Joseph Deloria, also known as Thípi Sápa, were Episcopal priests. Philip J. Deloria is also the great-great-grandson of U.S Army officer Alfred Sully, and the great-great-great-grandson of painter Thomas Sully. Growing up, his mother was a librarian at the Fairhaven Library in Bellingham, Washington. After school he and his brother often read at the library until their mother's shift ended.

== Education and career ==
Deloria graduated from the University of Colorado Boulder in 1982 with a B.M.E. in music education. In 1988, Deloria completed his M.A. in journalism and mass communications at the University of Colorado Boulder. Deloria received his Ph.D. in American studies from Yale University in 1994. Deloria worked as a professor at the University of Colorado in the Department of History from 1994 to 2000, before taking up a professorship at the University of Michigan, Ann Arbor, in both the Department of American Culture and the Department of History. Deloria was the associate dean of undergraduate education in the University of Michigan, Ann Arbor's College of Literature Science and the Arts and was the Carroll Smith-Rosenberg Collegiate Professor. In 2018 he was made the first tenured professor of Native American history at Harvard University. He is a trustee of the National Museum of the American Indian-Smithsonian and a former chair of the Repatriation Committee. Deloria is the 2022 president of the Organization of American Historians.

- 2021: Curti Lecturer

== Published works ==
Deloria is the author of three non-fiction books and a number of articles and book chapters.

Deloria's 1998 text, Playing Indian, addresses the historical phenomenon of "playing Indian", whereby non-Native people in the United States construct national and personal identities through the performance of Indian dress and ritual. It was adapted from his dissertation at Yale, which he finished in 1994. Playing Indian won the 1999 Gustavus Myers Outstanding Book Award from the Gustavus Myers Program for the Study of Bigotry and Human Rights in North America.

Deloria's second book, Indians in Unexpected Places (2004), explores stereotypes of Native American people which confine them to the past and analyzes the seeming disunity between Indian people and modernity. Indians in Unexpected Places received the John C. Ewers Prize for Ethnohistorical Writing in 2006 from the Western History Association.

Deloria's third book, Becoming Mary Sully: Toward an American Indian Abstract (2019), works through the ways in which the artwork produced by his great-aunt Mary Sully interacts with the larger art historical cannon of Modernism.

Deloria additionally produced, directed, and edited PBS program Eyanopapi: Heart of the Sioux.

== List of selected works ==
- Playing Indian. New Haven: Yale University Press, 1998. ISBN 978-0-300-08067-4.
- Blackwell Companion to American Indian History, ed. Boston: Blackwell Publishers, 2002. ISBN 978-1405121316
- Indians in Unexpected Places. Lawrence: University Press of Kansas, 2004. ISBN 978-0-7006-1459-2.
- C.G. Jung and the Sioux Traditions: Dreams, Visions, Nature, and the Primitive, ed. New Orleans: Spring Journal Press, 2009.
- "Four Thousand Invitations." American Indian Quarterly 37, no. 3 (July 2013): pages 25–43.
- "American Master Narratives and the Problem of Indian Citizenship in the Gilded Age and Progressive Era." The Journal of the Gilded Age and Progressive Era 14, no. 1 (Jan 2015): pages 3–12.
- American Studies: A User's Guide. University of California Press, 2017. ISBN 9780520287730
- Becoming Mary Sully: Toward an American Indian Abstract. Seattle: University of Washington Press, 2019.
- "Thanksgiving in Myth and Reality," New Yorker November 25 (2–19): pages 70–70.
- "Tecumseh's doomed quest for a Native confederacy," New Yorker (November 2, 2020), pages 76–80.
