= Vine Deloria Jr. =

Native American writer from South Dakota, U.S. (1933–2005)

- Born: Vine Victor Deloria Jr. March 26, 1933; Martin, South Dakota, U.S.
- Died: November 13, 2005 (aged 72); Golden, Colorado, U.S.

Vine Victor Deloria Jr. (March 26, 1933 – November 13, 2005) was an author, theologian, historian, and activist for Native American rights. He is widely known for his book Custer Died for Your Sins: An Indian Manifesto (1969), which helped attract national attention to Native American issues in the same year as the Alcatraz-Red Power Movement. From 1964 to 1967, he served as executive director of the National Congress of American Indians, increasing its membership of tribes from 19 to 156. Beginning in 1977, he was a board member of the National Museum of the American Indian, which now has buildings in both New York City and in Washington, DC, on the Mall.

Deloria began his academic career in 1970 at Western Washington State College at Bellingham, Washington. He became Professor of Political Science at the University of Arizona (1978–1990), where he established the first master's degree program in American Indian Studies in the United States. In 1990, Deloria began teaching at the University of Colorado Boulder. In 2000, he returned to Arizona and taught at the College of Law. NBC News called Vine Deloria the "star of the American Indian renaissance."

Deloria's writing and advocacy focused on contemporary American Indian movements and the treaty rights of Native American tribes. His later writings, particularly Red Earth, White Lies, rejected prevailing scientific accounts of Western Hemisphere prehistory that he thought contradicted Native American traditional history. For instance, he rejected the existence of Bering land bridge and embraced human–dinosaur coexistence. Deloria's critics wrote that his literalist views contributed to pseudoscience. He also falsely claimed the English introduced scalping to North America which is refuted by many archaeological examples of pre-contact scalping.

== Background and education ==
Vine Deloria Jr. was born in 1933, in Martin, South Dakota, near the Oglala Lakota Pine Ridge Indian Reservation. He was the son of Barbara Sloat (née Eastburn) and Vine Victor Deloria Sr. (1901–1990). His surname is derived from the name of a French trapper, Philippe des Lauriers, who settled and married into a Yankton community of the Dakota people in the early 19th century. His father studied English and Christian theology at St. Stephen's College and became an Episcopal archdeacon and missionary on the Standing Rock Indian Reservation. His father transferred his and his children's tribal membership from the Yankton Sioux to Standing Rock. Vine Sr.'s sister Ella Deloria (1881–1971) was an anthropologist. Vine Jr.'s paternal grandfather was Tipi Sapa (Black Lodge), also known as the Rev. Philip Joseph Deloria, an Episcopal priest and a leader of the Yankton band of the Dakota Nation. His paternal grandmother was Mary Sully, daughter of Alfred Sully, a general in the American Civil War and Indian Wars, and his French-Yankton wife; and granddaughter of painter Thomas Sully.

Deloria was first educated at reservation schools, then graduated from Kent School in 1951. He graduated from Iowa State University in 1958 with a degree in general science. Deloria served in the United States Marines from 1954 through 1956.

Originally planning to be a minister like his father, Deloria in 1963 earned a theology degree from the Augustana Theological Seminary in Rock Island, Illinois. In the late 1960s, he returned to graduate study and earned a J.D. degree from University of Colorado Law School in 1970.

== Activism ==
In 1964, Deloria was elected executive director of the National Congress of American Indians. During his three-year term, the organization went from bankruptcy to solvency, and membership increased from 19 to 156 tribes. Through the years, he was involved with many Native American organizations.

Deloria was the founder and head of the Institute of American Indian Law and the Institute for the Development of Indian law. Both the Institute for the Development of Indian Law and the Institute of American Indian Law sought to develop and provide legal training and assistance to Native American tribes, organizations, and courts. In 1971, they sought to form a national taxation defense strategy to fight federal, state, and municipal governments' attempts to impose taxes on various aspects of tribal and individual economic life. In 1972 the Institute published Taxing Those They Found Here: An Examination of the Tax Exempt Status of the American Indian by Jay Vincent White, with Deloria contributing the Foreword.

Deloria was an expert witness for the defense team in the Wounded Knee Trials in 1974. He was the first witness to be called by the defense lawyers to provide testimony. An hour after he took to the stand, the judge ordered the Sioux Treaty of 1868 to be admitted.

Beginning in 1977, he was selected as a board member of the National Museum of the American Indian, which established its first center at the former United States Custom House in New York City in lower Manhattan.

While teaching at Western Washington State College at Bellingham, Washington, Deloria advocated for the treaty fishing rights of local Native American tribes. He worked on the legal case that led to the historic Boldt Decision of the United States District Court for the Western District of Washington. Judge Boldt's ruling in United States v. Washington (1974) validated Indian fishing rights in the state as continuing past the tribes' cession of millions of acres of land to the United States in the 1850s. Thereafter Native Americans had the right to half the catch in fishing in the state, to take the fish from territory away from their reservations, and to manage the fisheries together with the state.

== Writing ==
In 1969, Deloria published his first of more than twenty books, entitled Custer Died for Your Sins: An Indian Manifesto. This book became one of Deloria's most famous works. In it, he addressed stereotypes of Indians and challenged white audiences to take a new look at the history of United States western expansion, noting its abuses of Native Americans. The book was released the year that students of the Alcatraz-Red Power Movement occupied Alcatraz Island to seek construction of an Indian cultural center, as well as attention in gaining justice on Indian issues, including recognition of tribal sovereignty. Other groups also gained momentum: the American Indian Movement was founded in 1968 among urban Indians in Minneapolis, and staged events to attract media and public attention for education about Indian issues.

Deloria's book helped draw attention to the Native American struggle. Focused on the Native American goal of sovereignty without political and social assimilation, the book stood as a hallmark of Native American Self-Determination at the time. The American Anthropological Association sponsored a panel in response to Custer Died for Your Sins. The book was reissued in 1988 with a new preface by the author, noting, "The Indian world has changed so substantially since the first publication of this book that some things contained in it seem new again."

Deloria wrote and edited many subsequent books and 200 articles, focusing on issues as they related to Native Americans, such as education and religion. In 1995, Deloria argued in his book Red Earth, White Lies that the Bering Strait Land Bridge never existed, and that, contrary to archaeological and anthropological evidence, the ancestors of the Native Americans had not migrated to the Americas over such a land bridge. Rather, he asserted that the Native Americans either originated in the Americas or reached them through transoceanic travel, as some of their creation stories suggested. Nicholas Peroff wrote that "Deloria has rarely missed a chance to argue that the realities of precontact American Indian experience and tradition cannot be recognized or understood within any conceptual framework built on the theories of modern science."

Deloria controversially rejected not only scientific understanding regarding the origins of indigenous peoples in the Americas, but also other aspects of the (pre)history of the Western Hemisphere that he thought contradicted Native American accounts. For example, Deloria's position on the age of certain geological formations, the length of time Native Americans have been in the Americas, and his belief that people coexisted with dinosaurs were strictly at odds with the empirical facts from a variety of academic disciplines.

Defending himself from the inevitable critiques, Deloria accused mainstream scientists of being incapable of independent thinking and hobbled by their reverence for orthodoxy. He wrote that scientists characteristically persecuted those like him who dared to advance unorthodox views. He argued that science was essentially a religion, with its own orthodoxy. Deloria was criticized for his embrace of literalist interpretations of American Indian traditional histories by anthropologist Bernard Ortiz de Montellano and English professor H. David Brumble. They argued that promoting views that were unsupported by scientific and physical evidence directly contributed to the proliferation of pseudoscience.

In his writings, particularly his contribution to Ward Churchill's book Marxism and the Native Americans, Deloria was critical of Marxism, citing its inability to take non-European ideas into account and its reductive approach with regard to the family, gender and justice. Deloria also noted that Marxism resembled Indigenous philosophies and stated that the merits of Marxism were found in its critique of capitalism, a system that Deloria staunchly opposed.

== Academic career ==
In 1970, Deloria took his first faculty position, teaching at the Western Washington University College of Ethnic Studies in Bellingham, Washington. As a visiting scholar, he taught at the Pacific School of Religion, the New School of Religion, and Colorado College. From 1972 to 1974 he also taught at the University of California, Los Angeles.

Deloria's first tenured position was as Professor of Political Science at the University of Arizona, which he held from 1978 to 1990. While at UA, Deloria established the first master's degree program in American Indian Studies in the United States. Such recognition of American Indian culture in existing institutions was one of the goals of the Alcatraz-Red Power Movement. Reflecting widespread change in academia and the larger culture, numerous American Indian studies programs, museums, and collections, and other institutions have been established since Deloria's first book was published.

Deloria next taught at the University of Colorado Boulder from 1990 to 2000. After he retired from CU Boulder, he taught at the University of Arizona's College of Law.

In 2004, Deloria turned down an honorary degree from the University of Colorado in protest of the school's poor response to a sexual assault case on its football team.

== Honors and legacy ==
- In 1974, after the publication of God Is Red: A Native View of Religion, Time Magazine named Deloria as one of the primary "shapers and movers" of Christian faith and theology.
- In 1996, Deloria received the Lifetime Achievement Award from the Native Writers' Circle of the Americas.
- In 1999, Deloria had the Vine Deloria Jr. Library at the National Museum of the American-Smithsonian named after him.
- In 1999, he received the Wordcraft Circle Writer of the Year Award in the category of prose and personal/critical essays for his work Spirit and Reason.
- In 2002, he received the Wallace Stegner award from the Center of the American West and was honorably mentioned at the 2002 National Book Festival.
- In 2003, he won the 2003 American Indian Festival of Words Author Award.
- In 2018, he was posthumously selected as one of the first twelve inductees and inducted into the new National Native American Hall of Fame.

== Marriage and family ==
At his death, Deloria was survived by his wife, Barbara, their children, Philip, Daniel, and Jeanne, and seven grandchildren.

His son, Philip J. Deloria, is also a noted historian and author.

== Final years and death ==
After Deloria retired in May 2000, he continued to write and lecture. He died on November 13, 2005, in Golden, Colorado, from an aortic aneurysm.

== Works ==
=== Books: author ===
- Custer Died For Your Sins: An Indian Manifesto, New York: Macmillan, 1969. ISBN 0-8061-2129-7; later edition with new preface: Norman, University of Oklahoma Press, 1988. ISBN 978-08061-2129-1.
- We Talk, You Listen; New Tribes, New Turf, New York: Macmillan, 1970.
- The Red Man in the New World Drama: A Politico-legal Study with a Pageantry of American Indian History, New York: Macmillan, 1971.
- Of Utmost Good Faith, San Francisco: Straight Arrow Books, 1971.
- God Is Red: A Native View of Religion, Grosset & Dunlap, 1973. ISBN 9780448021683.
- Behind the Trail of Broken Treaties: An Indian Declaration of Independence, New York: Dell Publishing Co., 1974.
- The Indian Affair, New York: Friendship Press, 1974. ISBN 0-377-00023-X.
- A Better Day for Indians, New York: Field Foundation, 1976.
- Indians of the Pacific Northwest, New York: Doubleday, 1977. ISBN 0-385-09790-5.
- The Metaphysics of Modern Existence, San Francisco: Harper & Row, 1979. ISBN 0-06-450250-3.
- American Indians, American Justice, Austin: University of Texas Press, 1983. ISBN 0-292-73834-X.
- A Sender of Words: Essays in Memory of John G. Neihardt, Salt Lake City: Howe Brothers, 1984. ISBN 0-935704-22-1.
- The Nations Within: The Past and Future of American Indian Sovereignty, New York: Pantheon Books, 1984. ISBN 0-394-72566-2.
- American Indian Policy In The Twentieth Century, Norman: University of Oklahoma Press, 1985. ISBN 0-8061-1897-0.
- Frank Waters: Man and Mystic, Athens: Swallow Press: Ohio University Press, 1993. ISBN 0-8040-0978-3.
- Red Earth, White Lies: Native Americans and the Myth of Scientific Fact, New York: Scribner, 1995. ISBN 0-684-80700-9.
- For This Land: Writings on Religion in America, New York: Routledge, 1999. ISBN 0-415-92114-7.
- Singing For A Spirit: A Portrait of the Dakota Sioux, Santa Fe, N.M.: Clear Light Publishers, 1999. ISBN 1-57416-025-7.
- Spirit and Reason: The Vine Deloria Jr. Reader, Golden, Colorado: Fulcrum Pub, 1999. ISBN 1-55591-430-6.
- Power and Place: Indian Education in America (with Daniel Wildcat), Golden, CO: Fulcrum Pub., 2001. ISBN 155591859X
- Tribes, Treaties, and Constitutional Tribulations (with David E. Wilkins), Austin: University of Texas Press, 1999. ISBN 0-292-71607-9.
- Evolution, Creationism, and Other Modern Myths, Golden, Colorado: Fulcrum Pub, 2002.
- Genocide of the Mind: New Native American Writing (with Marijo Moore), New York: Nation Books, 2003. ISBN 1-56025-511-0.
- The World We Used to Live In: Remembering the Powers of the Medicine Men, Fulcrum Publishing, Golden, CO. 2006. ISBN 978-1-55591-564-3(pbk.); ISBN 1-55591-564-7.
- We Talk, You Listen: New Tribes, New Turf, Lincoln: University of Nebraska Press, 2007. ISBN 978-0803259850
- C. G. Jung and the Sioux Traditions: Dreams, Visions, Nature, and the Primitive, New Orleans, LA, 2009. ISBN 978-1-882670-61-1.

=== Books: editor ===
- Aggressions of Civilization: Federal Indian Policy Since The 1880s, Philadelphia: Temple University Press, 1984. ISBN 0-87722-349-1.
- A Sender of words: essays in memory of John G. Neihardt. Salt Lake City: Howe Bros., 1984. ISBN 0935704221
- The Indian Reorganization Act: Congresses and Bills. Norman: University of Oklahoma Press, 2002. 978-08061-3398-0.

=== Papers, reports, oral histories ===
- Reminiscences of Vine V. Deloria, Yankton Sioux Tribe of South Dakota, New York Times oral history program: American Indian oral history research project. Part II; no. 82. 1970.
- The Right To Know: A Paper, Washington, D.C.: Office of Library and Information Services, U.S. Dept. of the Interior, 1978.
- A Brief History of the Federal Responsibility to the American Indian, Washington, D.C.: Dept. of Health, Education, and Welfare, 1979.

== Secondary literature ==
- Steiner, Stan (1968). The New Indians. New York: Harper & Row.
- DeMallie, Raymond J. (December 2006). "Vine Deloria Jr. (1933–2005)". American Anthropologist. New Series. 108 (4): 932–35. doi:10.1525/aa.2006.108.4.932.
- Biolsi, Thomas; Zimmerman, Larry J., eds. (1997). Indians and Anthropologists: Vine Deloria Jr., and the Critique of Anthropology. University of Arizona Press. ISBN 0-8165-1607-3.
- Pavlik, Steve; Wildcat, Daniel R., eds. (2006). Destroying Dogma: Vine Deloria Jr. and His Influence on American Society. Golden, CO: Fulcrum. ISBN 1-55591-519-1.
- Martínez, David (2019). Life of the Indigenous Mind: Vine Deloria Jr. and the Birth of the Red Power Movement. Lincoln, NE: The University of Nebraska Press. ISBN 978-1-4962-1190-3.

== See also ==
- List of writers from peoples indigenous to the Americas
- Native American studies

== Sources ==
- Deloria Jr., Vine (1973). God is Red: A Native View of Religion (30th Anniversary ed.). Golden, CO: Fulcrum, 2003. ISBN 978-15559-1498-1.
- Vollan, Charles. "Vine Deloria, Sr." Encyclopedia of the Great Plains Indians. Lincoln: University of Nebraska Press, 2007. ISBN 978-0-8032-9862-0.
- Wilkinson, Charles F.Blood Struggle: The Rise of Modern Indian Nations. New York: W.W. Norton and Company, 2005. ISBN 978-0-393-05149-0.
- Native American Authors Project: Vine Deloria Jr. Retrieved May 17, 2005.
