= List of trademarks featuring Native Americans =

This list is for trademarks of corporations and organizations which feature an actual or stylised Native American figure.

== Automobile industry ==
- Pontiac

== Financial services ==
- Mutual of Omaha (1950–2020)

== Food and drink manufacturers ==
- Calumet Baking Powder Company
- Crazy Horse Beer
- Land O'Lakes butter (formerly)
- Jacob Leinenkugel Brewing Company
- Spur Steak Ranches

== Sports teams ==
- Washington Redskins
- Cleveland Indians (Chief Wahoo)
- University of Illinois at Urbana–Champaign (Chief Illiniwek)
- Chicago Blackhawks
- Atlanta Braves (Chief Noc-A-Homa)
- Frölunda HC
- Portland Winter Hawks
- Elora Mohawks
- Exeter Chiefs
- Florida State Seminoles
- Armijo High School
- North Dakota Fighting Sioux
- San Diego State Aztecs (1961–2002)

== Tobacco industry ==
- Lorillard Tobacco Company
- Natural American Spirits
- Red Man Tobacco Company (formerly)
