= Waterlily (novel) =

1988 novel by Ella Cara Deloria

- Author: Ella Cara Deloria
- Language: English
- Publisher: University of Nebraska Press
- Publication date: 1988
- Publication place: United States
- Media type: Paperback
- Pages: 244
- ISBN: 0-8032-4739-7

Waterlily is a novel by Ella Cara Deloria.

== Overview ==
Waterlily was written by Deloria in the early 1940s but was not published until 1988, eighteen years after her death. The original novel was significantly longer than its published counterpart, but under the advice of Ruth Benedict, a colleague of Franz Boas, the novel was condensed to half of its size in order to focus more closely on the plot. The novel reflects Deloria's ethnographic research and her desire to chronicle Dakota traditions and cultural values. Waterlily describes Dakota life before it was altered by American western expansion.

The novel follows two generations of Sioux women, Blue Bird and Waterlily; a mother-daughter pair who both learn through life experiences the meaning and importance of kinship. Waterlily takes place in the Great Plains of the Midwest and recounts the nomadic nature of the Sioux camp circle. The Sioux term for camp circle, tiyóšpaye, is an essential throughout the novel as a driving force for bonding, conflict, relationships, and change. Although Waterlily is told from a third-person omniscient point of view, it is unique in that it focuses mostly on women's roles and experiences in Dakota society.

In 1942, Deloria began her work on Waterlily. Ruth Benedict, her colleague, suggested that she concentrate her work on the structure of the Sioux culture. Deloria worked closely with Benedict and Boas, who encouraged Deloria to compile her knowledge of the native culture using literature. It took twenty years of studying the Sioux's historical background for her to produce the novel. Deloria was able to translate important ceremonial rituals. As an ethnographer, her ability to translate such important events in the Sioux culture has made her novel a notable and well-recognized piece of literature in the study of native kinship. Her translations allowed Sioux traditions to be preserved as accurately as possible for not only later generations, but for individuals who were not familiar with Sioux culture. Deloria interviewed other Sioux individuals in an attempt to make her novel as realistic and factual as possible. Deloria's formal occupation throughout her professional life was not as an anthropologist; rather, her work was intended to help her readers comprehend the way of life for the Sioux through a woman's point of view. Her ultimate intention was to present the Sioux's cultural practices through historical writing. The novel conveys kinship in an untraditional feminist manner, portraying the particularities of Sioux life with particular attention to women's role in society. The novel is written in a manner that exposes the realities of the Sioux, most notably the relevancy of kinship. As a Sioux woman, she includes the particular and separate traditions of men and women. In Waterlily, Deloria exposes unique and controversial Sioux traditions, among them, the Sun Dance ritual and bridal purchasing. Deloria uses ethnography, anthropology, and historiography to wholly encompass all aspects of Sioux culture in a way that would inform and entertain.

== Plot ==
The story starts with Blue Bird giving birth silently and alone to a baby girl while her husband's camp-circle is on the move. She names the baby Waterlily after being overwhelmed by the beauty of waterlily in a nearby body of water. Blue Bird returns to the camp where she is taken care of by her cousin. Blue Bird then recalls her childhood at age 14 when she lost her family. She had accompanied her grandmother to go and gather beans and firewood, and upon their return, they realize that their campsite has been attacked. They travel to a nearby camp-circle where they are adopted. Star Elk, one of the young men of the tribe, proposes to Blue Bird, and she gives him her word that she will marry him. The couple elopes, which was not an entirely honorable way to enter marriage, but since he did not dishonor Blue Bird their marriage is considered acceptable. Blue Bird gains recognition in the tribe as an honorable woman and is accepted by Star Elk's family, but Star Elk proves to be a lazy, rude, and inattentive husband. Blue Bird's flashback ends and she is content with her baby. However, Star Elk continues to be a difficult and jealous husband. He attempts to shame Blue Bird by "throwing her away" publicly, but instead he loses his own prestige because Blue Bird had proven herself as a respectable woman.

Shortly after Star Elk's attempt to shame Blue Bird, visitors arrive from a nearby camp circle and recognize Blue Bird's grandmother as their own. Black Eagle, a grandson of Blue Bird's grandmother, returns for them and brings them back to their original camp. Camp life resumes but is struck by tragedy when Blue Bird's grandmother passes away while picking up firewood. Rainbow, the father of Little Chief, a young boy that Blue Bird had made moccasins for, proposes to Blue Bird and she accepts. Gloku, Rainbow's mother, eagerly accepts Blue Bird as her daughter-in law. Like Waterlily, Gloku had also had a difficult childhood. It is revealed that she survived a violent attack on her tiyospaye. Woyaka, the storyteller, tells the story of the buffalo dreamer and explains the dreamer's essential role and legend of bringing buffalo to the tribe. Blue Bird continues to learn about proper kinship with Rainbow's familial members. One morning, Blue Bird returns to her tipi to find a snake coiled around Ohiya, Little Chief's brother. A snake dreamer is called, and he lures the snake away from the baby, stating that the snake's visit was a good omen. Waterlily also scares her family members when she becomes ill after eating too much pemmican cake. Blue Bird promises Waterlily that Rainbow would throw her a hunka ceremony making her a "child beloved" (a very honorable status) if she gets well. Little Chief demonstrates that he is growing up when he kills his first buffalo, his first enemy, and joins a war party. Waterlily's prestige is strengthened when Rainbow sponsors a Buffalo Ceremony for her, which was a very rare and costly ceremony. Rainbow also demonstrates his own importance within the tribe by being asked to become a member of the Kit Fox Society, an elite group of prestigious men.

Rainbow then plans a trip to go visit his kola, which was a term held for men who pledged a very strong friendship pact to each other. During this journey, "Long Knives" (white settlers) are discussed for the first time, as the Dakota are puzzled by their wagons. The women express interest at the cloths that "Long Knives" have, as well as the variety of materials that are available at the trader's stores. During the visit, the Dakota invite the Omaha to the Sun Dance, which was the most important religious event for the Dakota. This event held men who had made oaths to their words as individuals fasted, wept, sang, or subjected themselves to ritualized scarring. During this ceremony, Waterlily notices Lowanla, a boy who had a beautiful singing voice who was part of the Sun Dance. Lowanla had made a promise to the Great Spirit when his father was sick that if he got well that he would give up one hundred pieces of his flesh. His father did get well, and at the Sun Dance he would have to honor his promise. He bravely takes twenty cuts of flesh at the ceremony, but unprecedentedly his aunts demanded that they take the remaining cuts. Lowanla's sisters follow, and the hundred cuts are taken. Waterlily boldly goes over to his tent with a pan of water, but slides it under the tipi and runs away so that he does not see her. She becomes ashamed after she does this, and vows never to tell anyone of her act.

Rainbow and the rest of the family return home and Blue Bird lectures Waterlily about the proper ways to accept a marriage. Waterlily witnesses the Virgin's fire, where Leaping Fawn vindicates herself after a man incorrectly tries to tarnish her honor. Gloku passes away, and Waterlily properly mourns for her grandmother. Months later, Waterlily is "bought" by Sacred Horse. She experiences internal conflict as she does not know Sacred Horse, but also feels that marrying Sacred Horse would fulfill her kinship obligations. Two horses that were intended to honor Gloku had been killed in the middle of the night. Bear Soldier, on behalf of his son Sacred Horse, had offered to buy Waterlily for two fine horses in replacement of the ones murdered. After much deliberation, Waterlily accepts.

Sacred Horse proves to be a considerate husband, although quiet and shy. Waterlily finds adjusting to married life a long process as she has to adapt not only to a husband, but also to an entirely new tiyospaye. However, life is made more comfortable when she is "adopted" by a woman who remembers her as Ohiya's sister. In order to establish proper kinship, Waterlily makes her social parent's newborn moccasins, and is highly praised for her kinship responsibility.

At Sacred Horse's camp there is underlying talk of disease associated with "Long Knives" (smallpox) Sickness breaks out in the camp, and Sacred Horse tries to get his family to move elsewhere to avoid it. Tragically, Sacred Horse himself is stricken with the smallpox and dies alone by request. Soon after, the small tiyospaye is attacked by Non-Dakotas and many perish by scalping. Feeling alone, Waterlily (now with child) is called back by her social parents as they help her cope with her recent tragedies. While with her social parents it is arranged for Waterlily to return to her own tiyospaye.

Lowanla comes for her and they agree to get married under dual-consensus, which was also an honorable way to get married. Waterlily gives birth to a boy who she names Mithra. Waterlily is surprised when Lowanla remembers her from the Sun Dance, and tells her that he had received a little bucket of water at the ceremony and had hoped that it was she who delivered it. However, Waterlily had promised herself that she would never tell him that it was she who gave him the bucket, even when he said that it would make him perfectly happy all of his life. The novel ends with Waterlily's self-affirmation to never break her promise.

== Overlying theme: kinship ==
One of the main themes in Waterlily is that kinship was the foremost important aspect of Sioux society. Kinship ties were an obligation and were dominated by strict social rules, which determined the appropriate degree of interaction between individuals. Kinship obligations were a required necessity in order to maintain the delicate and intricate nature of camp life and ascribed to each person's role and status in the group. Waterlily experienced conflict between her own desires and her kinship obligations when Sacred Horse offered to purchase her as his bride. Although rejection of such an offer was not unprecedented, it was clear that to honor her family and to keep her word she had to accept the offer. Ultimately, it was Waterlily's adherence to kinship ties that formulated her decision.

Kinship not only applied solely to blood ties, but extended into social relationships as well. Social kinship was as important as blood-relatedness and required the same amount of attention and respect. It was social relatives, specifically social parents, that finally allowed Waterlily feel more comfortable in her husband's camp circle. These adopted parents acted as Waterlily's blood-parents and looked after her well-being . She reciprocated by acting as a proper daughter. Kinship however, did not always bring individuals closer together. Several kinship relations required avoidance and distant interactions. When Waterlily becomes part of Sacred Horse's camp circle she could only socially interact with certain individuals in specific ways. Her husband's relatives required a certain degree of distance and she could not share intimacies with her husband's female relatives . Breaking these kinship ties would not only bring dishonor upon herself, but also to her husband, his family, and her own.

Even though kinship ties were often difficult to follow because individual interests may conflict with them, kinship had to be followed under all circumstances. Kinship ties were essential to the survival of the camp circle and under ideal conditions were supposed to be seen as a pleasurable and necessary responsibility.
