= Playing Indian =

1998 nonfiction book by Philip J. Deloria

- Author: Philip J. Deloria
- Language: English
- Series: Yale Historical Publications Series
- Subject: Stereotypes of Native Americans, Cultural appropriation
- Publisher: Yale University Press
- Publication date: 1998
- Publication place: United States
- Media type: Print
- Pages: 262
- ISBN: 978-0300080674

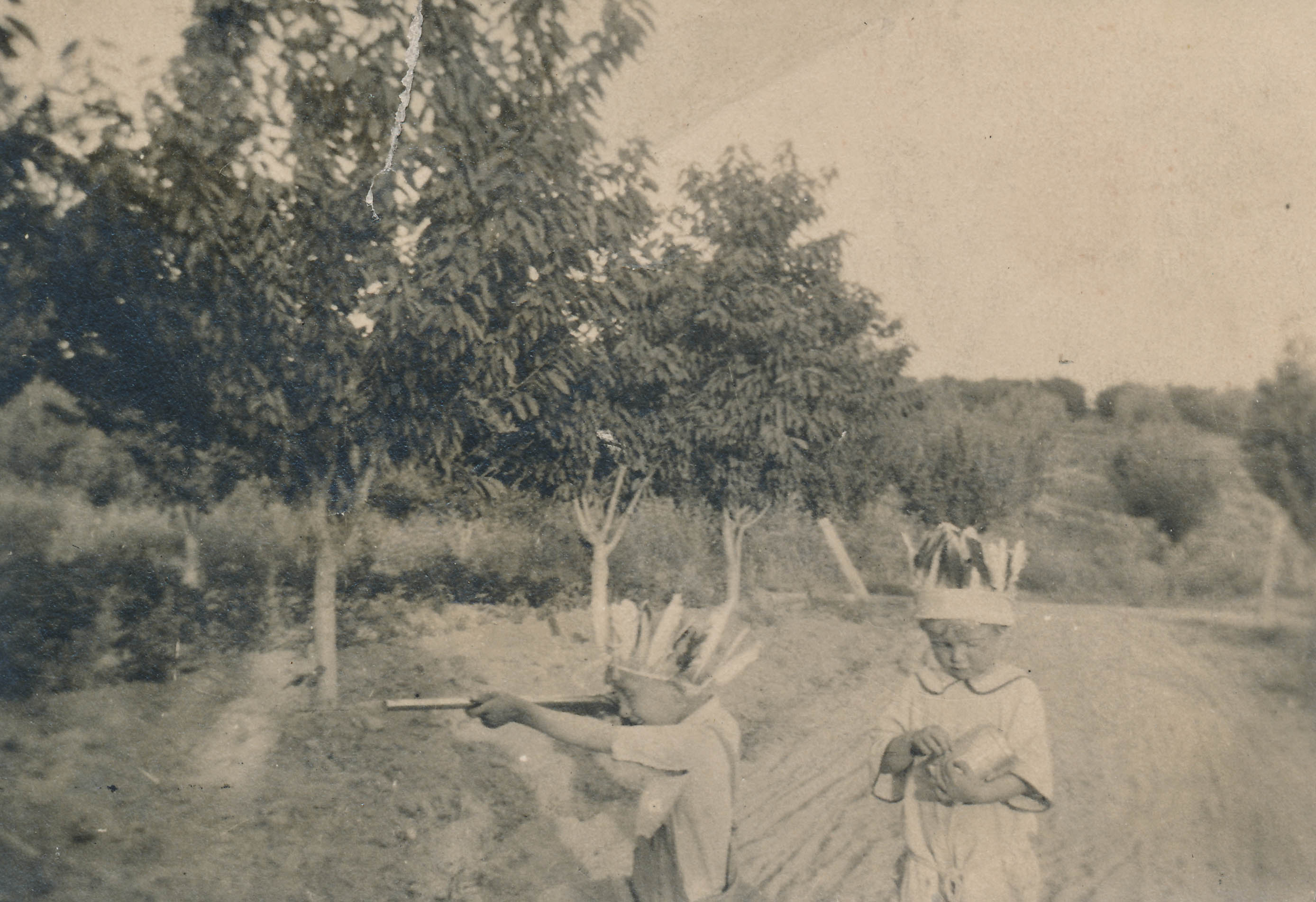
Two little boys "playing Indian" (1914)

Playing Indian is a 1998 non-fiction book by Philip J. Deloria, which explores the history of the conflicted relationship white America has with Native American peoples. It explores the common historical and contemporary societal pattern of non-Natives simultaneously mimicking stereotypical ideas and imagery of "Indians" and "Indianness" (the "Playing Indian" of the title), in a quest for national identity in particular, while also denigrating, dismissing, and making invisible real, contemporary Indian people.

== Overview ==
The focus is on how and why white Americans mimic stereotypical ideas of Indian traditions, images, spiritual ceremonies, and clothing, citing examples such as the Indian princess, Boston Tea Party, the Improved Order of Red Men, Tammany Hall, Scouting societies like the Order of the Arrow, and in more recent decades, hippies and New Agers. Referring to D. H. Lawrence's Studies in Classic American Literature, Deloria argues that white Americans have used an idealized image of the anachronistic Indian of historical times, and the practice of "playing Indian" to create their own national identity; both identifying with Indians as liberated, patriotic New World inhabitants in touch with nature, while simultaneously denigrating real, contemporary Native American people as ignorant, savage others, incapable or unworthy of preserving their own cultures.

"Disguise readily calls the notion of fixed identity into question," writes Deloria. "At the same time, however, wearing a mask also makes one self-conscious of a real 'me' underneath." The book is a reworking of Deloria's 1994 Yale doctoral dissertation.

He explores the white American dual fascination with "the vanishing Indian" and the idea that the white man can then be the true inheritor and preserver of authentic "Indianness", with the only "authentic" Indians being dead and in the past. A recurring trope in this pattern is "the Indian 'Death Speech'", an example he cites is from James Fenimore Cooper's The Redskins, "You hear my voice for the last time. I shall soon cease to speak."

In their dying moments, these Indian figures offered up their lands, their blessings, their traditions, and their republican history to those who were, in real life, violent conquering interlopers.

Deloria writes that, "not coincidentally" the first "lodges" of groups like Order of the Red Men were named after these literary figures, created by colonists to verbalize the wishes of the colonists,

By insisting that real Indians were disappearing or had already vanished, the Improved Order was able to narrate and perform a fraternal Indian history without having to account for the actions of real Indian people. This history was possible only when Indian removal policy was widespread and advanced.

Deloria refers to David Roediger's The Wages of Whiteness, a similar book about the construction of the white race in opposition to black slaves; his book has itself been compared to scholarly work on blackface and to the work of Richard White.

== See also ==
- Stereotypes of Indigenous peoples of Canada and the United States
- Vanishing Indian
- Cultural appropriation
- Legend of the Rainbow Warriors
- Noble savage
- Order of the Arrow
- Improved Order of Red Men
- Plastic shaman
- Pretendian
- Indigenous identity fraud in Canada and the United States
