= Vanishing Indian =

Indigenous stereotype

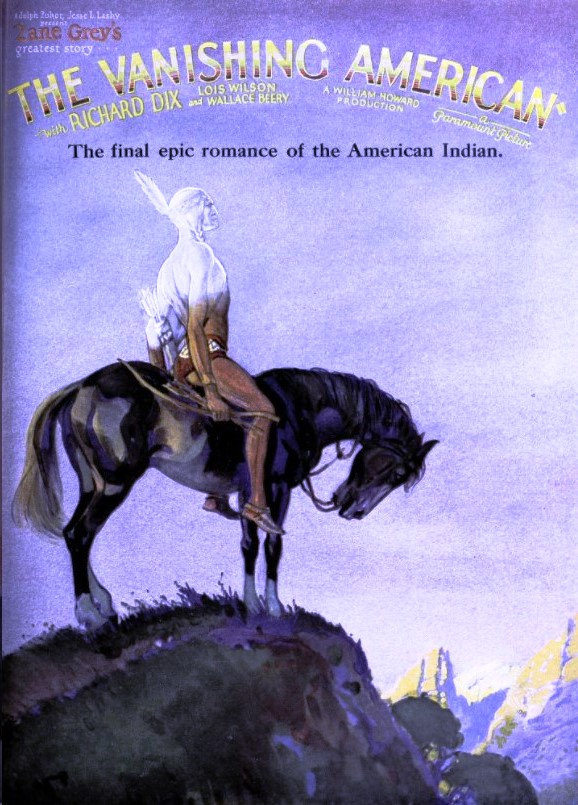
The Vanishing American, 1925 advertisement for a silent Western film.

The Vanishing Indian or Vanishing Indian Myth is a stereotype regarding the depiction of Indigenous people, generally in the Americas, although the concept is found elsewhere as well, that they either are extinct or are destined to go extinct.

== Common forms ==
A common expression in everyday speech is a form of "you can't be Indian, Indians are extinct". Another form is in the discussion of disappearance as inevitable, beginning this narrative in the early days of colonization. It is a common theme in the arts and media as well, that dates back to early colonial times. The vanishing Indian became a popular trope in American novels by the 1820s, exemplified famously by Last of the Mohicans by James Fenimore Cooper, as well as lesser-known works like Logan, a Family History by John Neal.

== Relationship to 'paper genocide' ==
A paper genocide occurs when members of a group are removed from all records, thereby validating the belief that the group is extinct and causing harm to further generations.

== See also ==
- Reel Injun
- Playing Indian
- Stereotypes of Indigenous peoples of Canada and the United States
- Blood Quantum
- Urban Indian
- Aboriginal Tasmanians
- Paper genocide
- Tribal disenrollment
- Indian termination policy
