= Ella Cara Deloria =

Yankton Dakota author (1889–1971)

- Aŋpétu Wašté Wiŋ
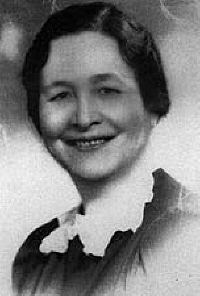
- Born: January 31, 1889; White Swan district of the Yankton Indian Reservation, South Dakota
- Died: February 12, 1971 (aged 82); Wagner, South Dakota, U.S.
- Education: Her father's mission school All Saints Boarding School; Oberlin College (B.Sc.); Teachers College, Columbia University
- Occupations: Educator, anthropologist, ethnographer, linguist, and novelist
- Known for: Recording Sioux oral history and legends; 1940 novel Waterlily; fluent in Dakota, Lakota, and Nakota dialects of Sioux, and Latin.
- Parent(s): Mary (Miriam) Sully Bordeaux Deloria and Philip Joseph Deloria
- Relatives: Sister Susan Deloria; brother Vine Victor Deloria, Sr.; Nephew Vine Deloria, Jr.
- Awards: Indian Achievement Award, 1943; Ella C. Deloria Undergraduate Research Fellowship established in her honor

Ella Cara Deloria (January 31, 1889 – February 12, 1971), also called Aŋpétu Wašté Wiŋ ('Beautiful Day Woman'), was a Yankton Dakota educator, anthropologist, ethnographer, linguist, and novelist. She recorded Native American oral history and contributed to the study of Native American languages. According to Cotera (2008), Deloria was "a pre-eminent expert on Dakota/Lakota/Nakota cultural, religious, and linguistic practices." In the 1940s, Deloria wrote the novel Waterlily, which was published in 1988 and republished in 2009.

== Life ==
Deloria was born in 1889 in the White Swan district of the Yankton Indian Reservation, South Dakota. Her parents were Mary (Miriam) Sully Bordeaux Deloria and Philip Joseph Deloria and had Yankton Dakota, English, French and German roots; the family surname goes back to a French trapper ancestor named Francois-Xavier Des Lauriers. Her father was one of the first Dakota to be ordained as an Episcopal priest. Her mother was the daughter of Alfred Sully, a general in the US Army, and a Métis Yankton Sioux. Ella was the first child to the couple, who each had several daughters by previous marriages. Her full siblings were sister Susan (also known as Mary Sully) and brother Vine Victor Deloria Sr., who became an Episcopal priest like their father. The writer Vine Deloria Jr. is her nephew.

Deloria was brought up among the Hunkpapa and Sihasapa Lakota people on the Standing Rock Indian Reservation, at Wakpala, and was educated first at her father's mission school, St. Elizabeth's Church and Boarding School, and then at All Saints Boarding School in Sioux Falls. After graduation in 1910, she attended Oberlin College, Ohio, to which she had won a scholarship. After three years at Oberlin, Deloria transferred to Columbia Teachers College, Columbia University, New York, and graduated with a B.Sc. and a special teaching certificate in 1915.

She went on to become

"one of the first truly bilingual, bicultural figures in American anthropology, and an extraordinary scholar, teacher, and spirit who pursued her own work and commitments under notoriously adverse conditions. At one point she lived out of a car while collecting material for Franz Boas."

Throughout her professional life, she suffered from not having the money or the free time necessary to take an advanced degree. She was committed to the support of her family. Her father and step-mother were elderly, and her sister Susan depended on her financially.

In addition to her work in anthropology, Deloria had a number of jobs, including teaching dance and physical education at Haskell Indian Boarding School, lecturing and giving demonstrations on Native American culture, and working for the Camp Fire Girls and for the YWCA as a national health education secretary. She held positions at the Sioux Indian Museum in Rapid City, South Dakota, and as assistant director at the W.H. Over Museum in Vermillion.

Deloria had a series of strokes in 1970, dying the following year of pneumonia.

== Work and achievements ==
Deloria met Franz Boas while at Teachers College, and began a professional association with him that lasted until his death in 1942. Boas recruited her as a student, and engaged her to work with him on the linguistics of Native American languages. She worked with Margaret Mead and Ruth Benedict, anthropologists who had been graduate students of Boas. For her work on American Indian cultures, she had the advantage of fluency in the Dakota, Lakota, and Nakota dialects of Sioux, in addition to English and Latin.

Although Deloria worked under Boas, Mead, and Benedict, experts have primarily focused on the bridge she built between White and Native cultural perspectives, Deloria's dual commitments to her work and family, and the importance of her expertise to Indigenous communities. Therefore, "exam[ining] Deloria's reciprocal mentoring relationships, in this way intervening in previous scholarship’s emphasis upon Deloria’s cultural mediation and personal hardships to highlight her impact on the field of anthropology...was instrumental in bringing about important advances to the field." This "reciprocal mentoring relationship" can be seen between Boas and Deloria.

Deloria met Franz Boas while at Teachers College; "Boas was impressed enough with this young woman (...) that he asked her to teach Siouan dialects (she was proficient in Lakota and Nakota dialects and spoke Dakota at home as a child) to his students in a class he was teaching in linguistics." Moreover, it has been contended that “the mentoring role demands even more of the anthropologist...anthropology mentors must suspend the skills they have worked so hard to develop and instead engage in a more passive role for providing insight and eventual understanding." Deloria established her "own clear, dissenting voice and pushed her mentors to alter their assumptions." Due to personal family obligations, Deloria "[was] forced to return home to the Midwest in 1915, and “it was not until 1927 that Deloria was reintroduced to the academic world of anthropology...Boas visited Deloria in Kansas that summer and asked her to recommence her work on the Lakota language." However, the relationship between Deloria and Boas was complex and has been further revealed through letters. " James Walker amassed an enormous body of information regarding Lakota beliefs, rituals, and myths. Boas had asked Deloria to substantiate his findings...She became critical of Walker’s work when she discovered that he had failed to separate creative fiction from traditional stories. After Deloria shared her findings with Boas, he did not hesitate to express his dissatisfaction." He was trying to align these answers with information from earlier European American anthropologists. On the other hand, "Boas encouraged Deloria to verify myths of the Lakota." Nevertheless, "Boas became and remained a charismatic mentor to Deloria, and through her voice of dissent, she challenged Boas to rise to a higher standard in his own work."

Her linguistic abilities and her intimate knowledge of traditional and Christianized Dakota culture, together with her deep commitment both to American Indian cultures and to scholarship, allowed Deloria to carry out important, often ground-breaking work in anthropology and ethnology. She also translated into English several Sioux historical and scholarly texts, such as the Lakota texts of George Bushotter (1864–1892), the first Sioux ethnographer (Deloria 2006; originally published in 1932); and the Santee texts recorded by Presbyterian missionaries Samuel and Gideon Pond, brothers from Connecticut.

In 1938–39, Deloria was one of a small group of researchers commissioned to do a socioeconomic study on the Navajo Reservation for the Bureau of Indian Affairs; it was funded by the Phelps Stokes Fund. They published their report, entitled The Navajo Indian Problem. This project opened the door for Deloria to receive more speaking engagements, as well as funding to support her continued work on Native languages.

In 1940, she and her sister Susan went to Pembroke, North Carolina to conduct some research among the Lumbee of Robeson County. The project was supported by the Bureau of Indian Affairs and the federal Farm Security Administration. Since the late 19th century, these mixed-race people, considered free people of color before the Civil War, had been recognized as an Indian tribe by the state of North Carolina, which allowed them to have their own schools, rather than requiring them to send their children to schools with the children of freedmen. They were also seeking federal recognition as a Native American tribe. Deloria believed she could make an important contribution to their effort for recognition by studying their distinctive culture and what remained of their original language. In her study, she conducted interviews with a range of people in the group, including women, about their use of plants, food, medicine, and animal names. She came very close to completing a dictionary of what may have been their original language before they adopted English. She also assembled a pageant with, for and about the Robeson County Lumbee in 1940 that depicted their origin account.

Deloria received grants for her research from Columbia University, the American Philosophical Society, the Bollingen Foundation, the National Science Foundation, and the Doris Duke Foundation, from 1929-1960s.

She was compiling a Lakota dictionary at the time of her death. Her extensive data has proven invaluable to researchers since that time.

== Legacy and honors ==
- In 1943, Deloria won the Indian Achievement Award.
- In 2010, the Department of Anthropology of Columbia University, Deloria's alma mater, established the Ella C. Deloria Undergraduate Research Fellowship in her honor.

== Selected works ==
=== Fiction ===
- 1991: Ella Deloria's Iron Hawk (single narrative), ed. Julian Rice. University of New Mexico Press; ISBN 0-8263-1447-3
- 1994: Ella Deloria's the Buffalo People (collection of stories), ed. Julian Rice. University of New Mexico Press; ISBN 0-8263-1506-2
- 2009: Waterlily, New edition. University of Nebraska Press; ISBN 978-0-8032-1904-5

=== Non-fiction ===
- 1928: The Wohpe Festival: Being an All-Day Celebration, Consisting of Ceremonials, Games, Dances and Songs, in Honor of Wohpe, One of the Four Superior Gods... Games, of Adornment and of Little Children
- 1929: The Sun Dance of the Oglala Sioux, Journal of American Folklore XLII: 354–413.
- 1932: Dakota Texts (reprinted 2006, Bison Books; ISBN 0-8032-6660-X)
- 1941: Dakota Grammar (with Franz Boas) (National Academy of Sciences; reprinted 1976, AMS Press, ISBN 0-404-11829-1)
- 1944: Speaking of Indians (reprinted 1998, University of Nebraska Press; ISBN 0-8032-6614-6)
- 2022: The Dakota Way of Life (edited by Raymond J. DeMallie and Thierry Veyrié), University of Nebraska Press ISBN 978-1-4962-3359-2
