= Comparison of Indonesian and Standard Malay =

Linguistic comparison

Indonesian and Malaysian Malay are two standardised varieties of the Malay language, the former used officially in Indonesia (and in Timor Leste as a working language) and the latter in Brunei, Malaysia and Singapore. Both varieties are generally mutually intelligible, yet there are noticeable differences in spelling, grammar, pronunciation and vocabulary, as well as the predominant source of loanwords. The differences can range from those mutually unintelligible with one another, to those having a closer familial resemblance. The divergence between Indonesian and "Standard" Malay are systemic in nature and, to a certain extent, contribute to the way the two sets of speakers understand and react to the world, and are more far- reaching with a discernible cognitive gap than the difference between dialects. The regionalised and localised varieties of Malay can become a catalyst for intercultural conflict, especially in higher education.

== Perception ==
To non-native speakers the two varieties may seem identical, but to native speakers the differences are noticeable through both diction and accent. They affect the broadcasting industry with regard to foreign language subtitling, for example, in DVD movies and on cable TV. To reach a wider audience, both Indonesian and Malay subtitles are sometimes displayed in a movie, along with other language subtitles. Another example is Malaysian TV providing Malay subtitling on Indonesian sinetrons (TV dramas) aired in Malaysia and vice versa. An intelligibility test was done in 1998 by Asmah Haji Omar to Malaysian Malay linguistics students with Indonesian newspapers shows the odd, unintelligible and unusual items formed 30% of the totality.

The Malay language in Indonesia and Malaysia also differs in recognition, where in Malaysia it enjoys status as the national language (Malaysian Malay), while in Indonesia it is considered a regional language in Malay-speaking areas such as the eastern to southern coast of Sumatra and West Kalimantan. The term "Malay language" (Bahasa Melayu) in Indonesia and Malaysia invites different perceptions from its respective people. To Malaysians, the Malay language is generally understood as the national language of Malaysia being a precise appellation for the Malay variety used in the country. Between 1986 and 2007, the term Bahasa Melayu was used instead of Bahasa Malaysia, until the Bahasa Malaysia was reinstated, to instill a sense of belonging among Malaysians of all races, rather than just Malays. Therefore, there was no clear distinction between the use of the term Malay (Bahasa Melayu) and the national language of Malaysia (Bahasa Malaysia). In Brunei and Singapore, where Malay is also an official language, the language is known as Bahasa Melayu and in English as "Malay".

In Indonesia, however, there is a clear distinction between "Malay language" (bahasa Melayu) and "Indonesian" (bahasa Indonesia). Indonesian is the national language which serves as the unifying language of Indonesia; despite being a standardized form of Malay, it is not referred to with the term "Malay" in common parlance. The term "Malay" is usually reserved for the forms of Malay indigenous to the Malay ethnic group (the national standardized language of Malaysia and the non-standard idioms of Malay people, including those used by Malay Indonesians). Thus, "Malay" is considered a regional language (bahasa daerah) in Indonesia, enjoying the same status as Javanese, Sundanese, Buginese, Balinese, Biak language and others. Moreover, to some Indonesians, the term "Malay" is more often associated with Malaysia and the Malaysian variety of Malay.

In Malaysia, the terms "Indonesian Malay" and "Malaysian Malay" are sometimes used for Indonesian and Malay as spoken in Malaysia. In Indonesia, "Indonesian Malay" usually refers to the vernacular varieties of Malay spoken by the Malay peoples of Indonesia, that is, to Malay as a regional language in Sumatra, though it is rarely used. Bahasa Malaysia and Bahasa Melayu are used interchangeably in reference to Malay in Malaysia.

Malay was designated as a national language by the Singaporean government after independence from Britain in the 1960s to avoid friction with Singapore's Malay-speaking neighbours of Malaysia and Indonesia. It has a symbolic, rather than functional purpose. It is used in the national anthem "Majulah Singapura", in citations of Singaporean orders and decorations and in military commands. Singaporean Malay is officially written in the Latin-based Rumi script, though some Singaporean Malays also learn the Arabic-based Jawi script. Jawi is considered an ethnic script for use on Singaporean identity cards.

== Orthography ==
=== Spelling ===
Before the 20th century, Malay was written in a local modified form of the Arabic alphabet known as Jawi. During the 20th century, Malay written with Roman letters, known as Rumi, almost completely replaced Jawi in everyday life. The romanisations originally used in British Malaya (now part of Malaysia) and the Dutch East Indies (now Indonesia) reflected their history as British and Dutch colonial possessions respectively. In British Malaya, the romanisation of Malay, devised by Richard Wilkinson was influenced by English, whereas in the Dutch East Indies, the system devised by C. A. Van Ophuijsen was influenced by Dutch. As a result, in Indonesia, the vowel [u] was formerly represented oe, as in Dutch, although the official spelling of this sound was changed to u in 1947 when the Republican Spelling System was used.

Similarly, until 1972, [tʃ] was represented in Malaysia as ch, whereas in Indonesia, it continued to follow Dutch and used tj. Hence the word for 'grandchild' used to be written as chuchu in Malaysia and tjoetjoe in Indonesia, until a unified spelling system was introduced in 1972 (known in Indonesia as Ejaan Yang Disempurnakan or the 'Perfected Spelling') which removed most differences between the two varieties: Malay ch and Indonesian tj became c: hence cucu. Indonesia abandoned the spelling dj [dʒ] to conform to the j already in use in Malaysia, while the old Indonesian j for the semivowel [j] was replaced with y as in Malaysia. Likewise, the velar fricative [x] which occurs in many Arabic loanwords, which used to be written 'ch' in Indonesian, became kh in both languages. However, oe was retained in some proper names, such as the name of the former vice-president, Boediono or former minister Mohammad Roem. The ch and dj letter combinations are still encountered in names such as Achmad and Djojo (pronounced as Akhmad and Joyo respectively), although the post-1972 spelling is now favoured.

Indonesian-Malaysian Spelling Comparison
IPA	Indonesian Old Spelling	Malaysian Old Spelling	Indonesian-Malaysian Post-1972 Spelling
/ə/	ě	ă, ĕ	e
/e/	e	e	e
/ɛ/	é		e
/tʃ/	tj	ch	c
/dˤ/		dh	d
/dʒ/	dj	j	j
/x/	ch	kh	kh
/ɲ/	nj	ny	ny
/zˤ/		dz	z
/ʃ/	sj	sh	sy
/θ/		th	s
/u/	oe	u	u
/j/	j	y	y

=== Punctuation ===
One notable difference in punctuation between the two languages is the use of different decimal marks; Indonesian, influenced by Dutch, uses the decimal comma, whereas Malay, influenced by English, uses the decimal point.

== Pronunciation ==
Pronunciation also tends to be very different, with East Malaysia, Standard Singapore, and Indonesia pronouncing words in a form called Bahasa Baku, where the words are pronounced as spelled. Moreover, enunciation tends to be clipped, staccato and faster than on the Malay Peninsula, which is spoken at a more languorous pace. Many vowels are pronounced (and were formerly spelt) differently in Peninsular Malaysia, Colloquial Singapore, and Riau Sumatra: tujuh is pronounced (and was spelt) tujoh, pilih as pileh, etc., and many final a's tend to be pronounced as schwas; [e] and [o] are also allophones of /i/ and /u/ in closed final syllables in peninsular Malaysian, Colloquial Singaporean and Riau Sumatran varieties of Malay; These pronunciation rules is known as Johor-Riau pronunciation.

Comparison of several standard pronunciations of Malay
	Example	Standard Pronunciation		
	Example	Indonesian–Baku	Johor–Riau (Piawai)	Northern Peninsular
⟨a⟩ in final open syllable	⟨kereta⟩	/a/	/ə/	/a/
⟨i⟩ in final closed syllable with final ⟨n⟩ and ⟨ng⟩	⟨kambing⟩	/i/	/e/	/i/
⟨i⟩ in final closed syllable with other final consonants	⟨itik⟩	/i/	/e/	/e/
⟨u⟩ in final closed syllable with final ⟨n⟩ and ⟨ng⟩	⟨tahun⟩	/u/	/o/	/u/
⟨u⟩ in final closed syllable with other final consonants	⟨lumpur⟩	/u/	/o/	/o/
final ⟨r⟩	⟨lumpur⟩	/r/	silent	/r/

The names for Latin letters are also of different origins, Indonesian names are from Dutch, while Malaysian Malay names are from English (see Malay-Indonesian alphabet).

Word	Indonesian	(Malaysian) Malay
ABC	[/a/./be/./t͡ʃe/]	[/e/./bi/./si/]
April	[a.pril]	[a. prɛl]
ATM	[/a/./te/./em/]	[/e/./ti/./em/]
A minor	[/a/ mi.nor]	[/e/ mi.no]
BCL	[/be/./t͡ʃe/./el/]	[/bi/./si/./el/]
BMW	[/be/./em/./we/]	[/bi/./em/./dabəlˈju/]
COD	[/t͡ʃe/./o/./de/]	[/si/./o/./di/]
DNA	[/de/./en/./a/]	[/di/./en/./e/]
E minor	[/e/ mi.nor]	[/i/ mi.no]
generasi	[ɡe.nə.ra.si]	[dʒe.nə.ra.si]
ghaib (ms), gaib (id)	[ga.ib]	[ɣɑ.ib]
HD	[/ha/./de/]	[/het͡ʃ/./di/]
HDMI	[/ha/./de/./em/./i/]	[/het͡ʃ/./di/./em/./aj/]
HIV	[/ha/./i/./fe/]	[/het͡ʃ/./aj/./vi/]
HRD	[/ha/./er/./de/]	[/het͡ʃ/./a:/./di/]
idea (ms), ide (id)	[i.de]	[i.de.ə]
IMF	[/i/./em/./ef/]	[/aj/./em/./ef/]
Ireland (ms), Irlandia (id)	[ir.lan.di.ja]	[a.jə.lənd]
ITB	[/i/./te/./be/]	[/aj/./ti/./bi/]
KCIC	[/ka/./t͡ʃe/./i/./t͡ʃe/]	[/ke/./si/./aj/./si/]
KLIA	[/ka/./el/./i/./a/]	[/ke/./el/./aj/./e/]
koir (ms), kor (id)	[kor]	[ko.je]
Malaysia	[ma.laj.siʲa]	[mə.le.sjə]
November	[no.fɛm.bər]	[no.vɛm.bə]
protein	[pro.te.in]	[pro.te.in]
RTM	[/er/./te/./em/]	[/a:/./ti/./em/]
RCTI	[/er/./t͡ʃe/./te/./i/]	[/a:/./si/./ti/./aj/]
SCTV (TV network)	[/es/./t͡ʃe/./te/./fe/]	[/es/./si/./ti/./vi/]
SPRM	[/es/./pe/./er/./em/]	[/es/./pi/./a:/./em/]
spesies	[spe.si.jɛs]	[spe.si.jəs]
teknologi	[tɛk.no.lo.ɡi]	[tɛk.no.lo.dʒi]
TVRI	[/te/./fe/./er/./i/]	[/ti/./vi/./a:/./aj/]
Ukraine (ms), Ukraina (id)	[u.kraj.na]	[ju.kren]
UNHCR	[/u/./en/./ha/./t͡ʃe/./er/]	[/ju/./en/./het͡ʃ/./si/./a:/]
UTM	[/u/./te/./em/]	[/ju/./ti/./em/]
vokal	[fo.kal]	[vo.kal]
WFH	[/we/./ef/./ha/]	[/dabəlˈju/./ef/./het͡ʃ/]
WHO	[/we/./ha/./o/]	[/dabəlˈju/./het͡ʃ/./o/]
WWW	[/we/./we/./we/]	[/dabəlˈju/./dabəlˈju/./dabəlˈju/]
xilem	[si.ləm]	[zi.ləm]
xilofon	[si.lo.fon]	[zi.lo.fon]

== Syllabification ==
Word	Indonesian syllabification	(Malaysian) Malay syllabification
problem	ma.sa.lah	mas.a.lah
start	mu.lai	mu.la.i
weather	cu.a.ca	cua.ca

== Vocabulary ==
=== Word derivation and compounds ===
Indonesian and (Standard Malaysian) Malay have similar derivation and compounds rule. However, there is difference on quasi-past participle or participle-like adjective when attached to a noun or verb. (Standard Malaysian) Malay uses prefix ber- to denote such, while Indonesian uses prefix ter- to do so. Prefix ber- can denote several other meanings.

Difference in word derivation and compounds
English	Indonesian	(Malaysian) Malay
Forestry	ilmu kehutanan	ilmu perhutanan
registered (having had one's name added to an official list or entered into a register)	terdaftar	berdaftar
local	setempat	tempatan
honorable	terhormat	berhormat
written (having been written)	tertulis	bertulis

=== Loanword source differences ===
Indonesian and Malaysian Malay both differ in the forms of loanwords used due to division of the Malay Archipelago by the Dutch and the British and their long-lasting colonial influences, as a consequence of the Anglo-Dutch Treaty of 1824: Indonesian absorbed primarily Dutch loanwords whereas Malaysian Malay absorbed primarily English words. Pronunciation of certain loanwords in Malaysian Malay follows English, while in Indonesian it follows Dutch, for example Malay "televisyen" (from English: television) and Indonesian "televisi" (from Dutch: televisie); the "-syen" and "-si" also prevail in some other words, though "-si" has become more preferred in Malay of late like generasi and dimensi.

Malaysian Malay has also experienced significant conservative pushback as precedent entities that existed within the British sphere made efforts to create words that would fit naturally foreign ideas of governance and thought through a Malay-oriented context. The Pakatan Belajar Mengajar Pengetahuan Bahasa in Johore headed by Abdul Rahman Andak during the 19th century was especially important in introducing neologisms like pejabat ("office", cf. Indonesian kantor from kantoor) and setiausaha ("secretary", cf. Indo sekretaris from Dutch: secretaris) into the Malay lexicon. For example, the word for 'post office' in Malaysia is "pejabat pos" (in Indonesia this means 'post officer'), whereas in Indonesia it is "kantor pos".

There are also some Portuguese influences: in Indonesia, Christmas is known as "Natal", whereas Malaysia uses both "Natal" and "Krismas", the latter derived from English. There are also instances where the Malaysian Malay version derives from English pronunciation while the Indonesian version takes its cue from Latin. The Latin preference of the (older) Indonesian intellectuals in these instances may be ascribed to the influence of their classical-oriented education when Gymnasium schools were established during the Dutch colonial period: compare Malaysian Malay kualiti, kuantiti, majoriti, minoriti and universiti with Indonesian kualitas, kuantitas, mayoritas, minoritas and universitas.

Some words which are spelt the same in both languages may even carry entirely different meanings in the other language, potentially leading to humorous or embarrassing situations: while baja means "steel" in Indonesian, in Malaysian Malay it means "fertiliser". Also, whereas the Indonesian word butuh (from Sundanese ᮘᮥᮒᮥᮂ butuh) means "require" or "need", in Malay, it is a vulgar slang term referring to male genitalia. Conversely, where the word "banci" seems innocuous enough in Malaysia ("census"), in Indonesia it is a derogatory term for "transvestite".

The relatively large share of Islamic (Arabic or Persian) loan words shared by Malaysian Malay and Indonesian often poses no difficulty in comprehension and usage, although some forms may have developed a (slightly) different meaning or have become obsolete either in Malaysian Malay or in Indonesian, e.g. khidmat, wakil.

=== English loanwords ===
One important aspect in differences between Malay (Malaysian and Brunei) and Indonesian is the degree of influence from English. Apart from being heavily influenced by the Dutch language, the Indonesian language also adopted a significant number of English loanwords in its vocabulary, although English did not play significant role on the Indonesian language and in fact most of these vocabulary are of Dutch origin – Dutch and English share a similar Germanic origin, and Dutch has also borrowed from Latin, although to a lesser extent than English. There have been many changes in Indonesian as a result of its historical development. Words have been freely borrowed from English and only partly assimilated, in many cases, to the Indonesian patterns of structure.

By the late 1970s, English words began pouring into the language, leading one commentator, writing in 1977, to refer to the "trend towards Indo-Saxonization", known in Indonesian as pengindosaksonan. Many loanwords from English sometimes fulfill no communicative need, expressing concepts adequately covered by existing words. Among the examples are: akurat instead of tepat (accurate, Dutch accuraat), aliansi in the place of sekutu (alliance, Dutch alliantie), eksis rather than ada (exist), kandidat as well as calon (candidate, Dutch kandidaat), konklusi instead of kesimpulan (conclusion, Dutch conclusie), kontaminasi in the place of pencemaran (contamination, Dutch contaminatie), opini rather than pendapat (opinion, Dutch opinie) and opsi in the place of pilihan (option, Dutch optie), brutal instead of kasar and kejam (savagely violent and harsh, Dutch brutaal). However, these pengindosaksonan are not borrowed directly from English, but through their cognates in Dutch pronunciations, as Pedoman Umum Pembentukan Istilah is heavily influenced by Dutch cognates.

=== Social and cultural differences ===
Lexical items that reflect separate social and cultural development.

==== Greeting, holiday and social activities ====
Greeting, holiday and social activities in Indonesian and Malaysian Standard Malay
English	Indonesian	Standard Malay	Note
Week	minggu / pekan		
Sunday	Minggu / Ahad	Ahad	
Public holiday	libur umum	cuti umum	
good, as in good morning	selamat	selamat	
congratulation	selamat	tahniah	
condolences	belasungkawa	takziah	both terms are used in Malaysian Malay. "Belasungkawa" carries a more formal tone.

===== Daily greeting =====
There are several notable differences in greeting terms.

Greeting in Indonesian and Malaysian Standard Malay
Occasion	Indonesian	Standard Malay	Note
	Selamat pagi		
12.00 – 13.00 (12 midday – 1 PM)	Selamat siang	Selamat tengah hari	
14.00 – 19.00 (2 – 7 PM)	Selamat sore	Selamat petang	Selamat petang in Indonesian is reserved for formal greeting at 16.30 to 18.30.
	Selamat malam		

===== Holiday and holiday greeting =====
Holiday and holiday greeting in Indonesian and Malaysian Standard Malay
	Indonesian	Standard Malay	
Chinese New Year	Tahun Baru Imlek	Tahun Baharu Cina	
Eid al-Fitr	Idulfitri	Aidilfitri	
	"Mohon maaf lahir dan batin”	"Maaf zahir dan batin”	Literally "I seek forgiveness (from you) physically and spiritually," one of the most common greetings in Eid-al Fitr.
Labour Day	Hari Buruh	Hari Pekerja	
Vesak	Waisak, Trisuci Waisak	Wesak	
Eid al-Adha	Iduladha	Aidiladha	
Islamic New Year	Tahun Baru Islam	Awal Muharam	
Mawlid	Maulid Nabi Muhammad	Maulidur Rasul	
Christmas	Natal	Krismas / Natal	

==== Education ====
Indonesia has a more uniform nationwide system of terms than does Malaysia. Public school (a publicly funded and administered school) is known as sekolah negeri in Indonesian and sekolah kebangsaan in Malaysia. Meanwhile, sekolah tinggi is a translation of high school in Malaysia (similar to English usage), while it refers to university college in Indonesia (similar to Flanders Dutch hogeschool).

School Years for Academic/General School System in Indonesian and Malaysian Standard Malay
Age Range	Indonesian	Malaysian Malay	Singaporean Malay	Brunei Malay
1–4	Kelompok Bermain			
3–5	PAUD			
5–6	TK Kecil			
5–6	TK Besar			
6–7	Sekolah Dasar (SD)	Sekolah Rendah		
6–7	Kelas 1 (Satu)	Darjah 1 (Satu)		Tahun 1 (Satu)
7–8	Kelas 2 (Dua)	Darjah 2 (Dua)		Tahun 2 (Dua)
8–9	Kelas 3 (Tiga)	Darjah 3 (Tiga)		Tahun 3 (Tiga)
9–10	Kelas 4 (Empat)	Darjah 4 (Empat)		Tahun 4 (Empat)
10–11	Kelas 5 (Lima)	Darjah 5 (Lima)		Tahun 5 (Lima)
11–12	Kelas 6 (Enam)	Darjah 6 (Enam)		Tahun 6 (Enam)
12–13	Sekolah Menengah Pertama (SMP)	Sekolah Menengah		
12–13	Kelas 7 (Tujuh)	Tingkatan 1 (Satu)		Tahun 7 (Tujuh)
13–14	Kelas 8 (Delapan)	Tingkatan 2 (Dua)		Tahun 8 (Lapan)
14–15	Kelas 9 (Sembilan)	Tingkatan 3 (Tiga)		Tahun 9 (Sembilan)
15–16	Sekolah Menengah Atas (SMA)	Tingkatan 4 (Empat)		Tahun 10 (Sepuluh)
15–16	Kelas 10 (Sepuluh)	Tingkatan 4 (Empat)		Tahun 10 (Sepuluh)
16–17	Kelas 11 (Sebelas)	Tingkatan 5 (Lima)		Tahun 11 (Sebelas)
16–17	Kelas 11 (Sebelas)	Kolej Tingkatan Enam Kolej Matrikulasi	Maktab Rendah	Tahun 11 (Sebelas)
16–17	Kelas 11 (Sebelas)	Tingkatan 6 (Enam) Bawah Matrikulasi		Tahun 11 (Sebelas)
17–18	Kelas 12 (Dua Belas)	Tingkatan 6 (Enam) Atas		Prauniversiti
17–18	Kelas 12 (Dua Belas)	Tingkatan 6 (Enam) Atas		Tahun 12 (Duabelas)
	Tertiary Education			

Tertiary education terms difference in Indonesian and Malaysian Standard Malay
	Indonesian	Malaysia Malay	Notes
Community college	Akademi komunitas	Kolej komuniti	
University	Universitas	Universiti	
Diploma		Diploma	
Associate degree	Sarjana Muda/Diploma	Diploma	
Bachelor's degree	Sarjana	Sarjana Muda	
Master's degree	Magister	Sarjana	
course (US), unit or module (UK)	mata kuliah	kursus	

==== Numerical expression ====
There are slight difference in numerical expression between Indonesian and Standard Malay. Indonesian, influenced by Dutch, uses the decimal comma, pronounced as "koma", whereas Malay, influenced by English, uses the decimal point, pronounced as "perpuluhan".

Countries and regions	Written	Speech
Indonesia	1.234.567,89	Satu juta dua ratus tiga puluh empat ribu lima ratus enam puluh tujuh koma delapan sembilan.
Malaysia, Singapore	1,234,567.89	Satu juta dua ratus tiga puluh empat ribu lima ratus enam puluh tujuh perpuluhan lapan sembilan.

==== Time ====
Indonesia uses 24-hour clock convention as standard, although 12-hour clock is common orally. In Malaysia, 12-hour clock is the standard. Brunei and Singapore use 24-hour clock convention as standard. In Indonesian, "pukul setengah tujuh" refers to half to seven (6.30) referring to Dutch "half zeven". However, in (Malaysian) Malay, "pukul tujuh setengah" means half past seven (7.30).

=== Academic, scientific, and legal terms ===
There are several confusing differences in academic, scientific and legal terms between Indonesian and Malaysian Standard Malay.

Academic, scientific, and legal term differences in Indonesian and Malaysian Standard Malay
	Indonesian	Malaysian Standard Malay	Singaporean Standard Malay	Note
force (physical quantity)	gaya	daya		
force (anything that has the power to produce an effect upon something else)	kuasa	daya		
power (measure of the rate of doing work or transferring energy)	daya	kuasa		
tax	pajak	cukai		
excise	cukai	eksais		
tissue (paper)	tisu			
tissue (biology)	jaringan	tisu		
network	jaringan	jaringan		
government	pemerintah	kerajaan	pemerintah	
mechanic (profession)	mekanik			
mechanic, mechanical	mekanis	mekanik		
mechanics	mekanika	mekanik		
technician	tèknisi	jurutéknik	téknisyen	
violence	kekerasan	keganasan		
concrete (real, actual, tangible)	konkret	konkrit		
concrete (building material)	beton	konkrit		

==== Information technology ====
A glossary of Information Technology terminology, available in English, Indonesian, and Malay, was published to facilitate the comparison and comprehension of language variations among individuals in Indonesia, Malaysia, Singapore, and Brunei who are seeking assistance and information online.

== Convergence and divergence ==
The rift of evolution between the two languages is based more on political nuance and the history of their formation than on cultural reasons. As a result, views regarding each other's languages differ amongst Malaysians and Indonesians. In Malaysia, the national language is Malay; in Indonesia, it is Indonesian. Malaysians tend to assert that Malay and Indonesian are merely different varieties of the same language, while Indonesians tend to treat them as separate – albeit closely related – languages. The result of this attitude is that the Indonesians feel little need to synchronize their language with Malaysia, Singapore and Brunei, whereas the Malaysians are keener to coordinate the evolution of the language with the Indonesians. However, both parties have realized that communication may benefit from mutually comprehensible and intelligible languages, which motivated efforts to synchronize the languages' development. The effort to synchronize both languages' evolution to increase their mutual intelligibility has been embarked by imposing standard rules of language. This process is headed by Badan Pengembangan dan Pembinaan Bahasa on the Indonesian side and Dewan Bahasa dan Pustaka as its Malaysian counterpart through Majlis Bahasa Brunei-Indonesia-Malaysia (MABBIM). Authorities in both Brunei and Singapore generally abide by the Malaysian standard in disputes. Although, MABBIM is not working properly which reflects Indonesian attitude of little need to synchronize their language.

== Example ==
Original text in Indonesian:

Apabila peraturan pakta stabilitas Eropa dihormati sampai ke detailnya, rasio utang publik dibanding produk domestik bruto pada hari krisis akan berada di posisi 10 persentase poin kurang dalam zona euro, katanya.

In Malay (Malaysian and Brunei):

Jika peraturan pakatan kestabilan Eropah dihormati secara terperinci, nisbah hutang awam berbanding keluaran dalam negara kasar pada zaman krisis akan berada di kedudukan 10 mata peratusan kurang dalam zon euro, kata beliau.

In English:

If the European stability pact rules had been respected in detail, the ratio of public debt to gross domestic product on the days of crisis would have been at the position 10 percentage points less in the eurozone, he said.

The following texts are excerpts from the official translations of the Universal Declaration of Human Rights in Indonesian and Malay (Malaysian and Brunei), along with the original declaration in English.

Indonesian	Malay (Malaysia and Brunei)	English
Maka, Majelis Umum memproklamasikan PERNYATAAN UMUM TENTANG HAK ASASI MANUSIA sebagai satu standar umum keberhasilan untuk semua bangsa dan negara, dengan tujuan agar setiap orang dan setiap badan dalam masyarakat dengan senantiasa mengingat Pernyataan ini, akan berusaha dengan jalan mengajar dan mendidik untuk menggalakkan penghargaan terhadap hak-hak dan kebebasan-kebebasan tersebut, dan dengan jalan tindakan-tindakan progresif yang bersifat nasional maupun internasional, menjamin pengakuan dan penghormatannya secara universal dan efektif, baik oleh bangsa-bangsa dari negara anggota sendiri maupun oleh bangsa-bangsa dari daerah-daerah yang berada di bawah kekuasaan hukum mereka. Pasal 1 Semua orang dilahirkan merdeka dan mempunyai martabat dan hak-hak yang sama. Mereka dikaruniai akal dan hati nurani dan hendaknya bergaul satu sama lain dalam semangat persaudaraan.	Maka dengan ini, Perhimpunan Agung mengisytiharkan PERISYTIHARAN SEJAGAT HAK ASASI MANUSIA ini sebagai suatu ukuran bersama terhadap pencapaian oleh seluruh umat manusia dan kesemua negara dengan tujuan supaya setiap individu dan setiap badan masyarakat, dengan sentiasa mengingati Perisytiharan ini, hendaklah berazam melalui pengajaran dan pendidikan bagi memajukan sanjungan terhadap seluruh hak-hak dan kebebasan ini dan secara langkah-langkah berperingkat-peringkat, di bidang negara dan antarabangsa, bagi menjaminkan pengkitirafan dan pematuhan sejagatnya yang berkesan, kedua-duanya di antara negara-negara anggota masing-masing dan rakyat wilayah-wilayah di bawah bidang kuasa mereka. Perkara 1 Semua manusia dilahirkan bebas dan samarata dari segi kemuliaan dan hak-hak. Mereka mempunyai pemikiran dan perasaan hati dan hendaklah bertindak di antara satu sama lain dengan semangat persaudaraan.	Now, therefore, The General Assembly proclaims This UNIVERSAL DECLARATION OF HUMAN RIGHTS as a common standard of achievement for all peoples and all nations, to the end that every individual and every organ of society, keeping this Declaration constantly in mind, shall strive by teaching and education to promote respect for these rights and freedoms and by progressive measures, national and international, to secure their universal and effective recognition and observance, both among the peoples of Member States themselves and among the peoples of territories under their jurisdiction. Article 1 All human beings are born free and equal in dignity and rights. They are endowed with reason and conscience and should act towards one another in a spirit of brotherhood.

== See also ==
- Majlis Bahasa Brunei-Indonesia-Malaysia
- Malay-Indonesian orthography
- Malay-Indonesian grammar
- Indonesian orthography
- Indonesian slang
