= Treuer =

Treuer is a surname. Notable people with the surname include:

- Anton Treuer (born 1969), American academic and author
- David Treuer (born 1970), American writer, critic, and academic
- Margaret Treuer (1943–2020), American judge and lawyer
