= The Heartbeat of Wounded Knee =

2019 nonfiction book by David Treuer

- Author: David Treuer
- Genre: History, memoir, reportage
- Publisher: Riverhead Books
- Publication date: January 22, 2019
- Media type: Print (hardcover and paperback), audiobook
- Pages: 528
- ISBN: 9781594633157
- Dewey Decimal: 970.004/97
- LC Class: 2018018371

The Heartbeat of Wounded Knee: Native America from 1890 to the Present is a 2019 nonfiction book by Ojibwe author David Treuer that reexamines the narrative of Native American history in the United States. Positioned as a counterpoint to Dee Brown’s 1970 book Bury My Heart at Wounded Knee, Treuer challenges the commonly held belief that Native American culture and political agency largely ended with the massacre at Wounded Knee in 1890.

Riverhead Books published the book in 2019 in the United States. Hachette published the book in the United Kingdom.

== Synopsis and background ==
The Heartbeat of Wounded Knee traces the lives, struggles, and resilience of Native Americans from the 1890 massacre at Wounded Knee to the present day. Treuer combines history, personal narrative, and contemporary reporting to highlight how Indigenous peoples have not only survived, but adapted and thrived despite systemic efforts to erase their cultures. The book reframes Native American history as one of endurance and continuity, challenging narratives of disappearance and defeat.

Treuer began the book as a response to Dee Brown's Bury My Heart at Wounded Knee, which he read at university in the 1990s. Brown's book is a history of Native Americans against the expansionism of the United States, culminating in the Wounded Knee Massacre of 1890. Unlike Brown, Treuer is Native American—an Ojibwe on his mother's side who was raised on a reservation, the Leech Lake Reservation in Minnesota. He expressed mixed feelings towards Brown's work, disliking its tone of finality, finding issue with lines like "the culture and civilization of the American Indian was finally destroyed" [sic] (Note: The quote in Brown's book is, "[D]uring that time the culture and civilization of the American Indian was destroyed.") In contrast, Treuer sought to portray "Indian life rather than Indian death”, shifting the lens away from elegy and toward continuity:

That we even have lives — that Indians have been living in, have been shaped by, and in turn have shaped the modern world — is news to most people. The usual story told about us — or rather, about “the Indian” — is one of diminution and death, beginning in untrammeled freedom and communion with the earth and ending on reservations, which are seen as nothing more than basins of perpetual suffering.

[...]

This book is written out of the simple, fierce conviction that our cultures are not dead and our civilizations have not been destroyed. It is written with the understanding that our present tense is evolving as rapidly and creatively as everyone else’s.

Treuer began conducting interviews for the book in 2014, but began writing it in 2016, a week after this father's death. He traveled extensively to various regions, including Montana, Washington state, North Dakota, and Minnesota, to conduct interviews with Native artists, activists, tribal leaders, and community members.

== Summary ==
=== Part 1: Narrating the Apocalypse (10,000 BCE–1890) ===
Treuer begins by rejecting the idea that Native American history ended at Wounded Knee in 1890. He traces a long arc of Indigenous civilisation across the continent, noting the adaptability, political complexity, and endurance of tribal nations in the face of colonisation. The narrative highlights early encounters with European powers, the rise of intertribal alliances, and a long history of negotiations and resistance that defined Native presence prior to American expansion.

=== Part 2: Purgatory (1891–1934) ===
This section covers the aftermath of the Wounded Knee massacre and the imposition of policies such as the Dawes Act, which aimed to dissolve tribal land ownership and promote assimilation. Treuer discusses the federal boarding school system, the suppression of Native religions, and the loss of cultural autonomy. Figures such as Thomas A. Bland and Francis Walker appear in debates about Native policy reform. Despite the repressive conditions, Native communities endured and preserved core aspects of identity and kinship.

=== Part 3: Fighting Life (1914–1945) ===
During the world wars, Native Americans served in high numbers in the U.S. military. Treuer explores how military service deepened the paradox of Native citizenship: fighting for a country that often denied their rights. He describes the economic hardships of the interwar period and the slow emergence of reform, notably through the Meriam Report of 1928. The account of Peter Graves and the creation of the Red Lake General Council illustrates tribal political innovation during this time.

=== Part 4: Moving On Up—Termination and Relocation (1945–1970) ===
Federal Indian policy turned sharply toward termination, with efforts to end tribal status and relocate Native populations to urban centres. Treuer recounts how these programs fractured communities but also seeded new urban Native identities. He profiles Red Hall, who recounts his experience of relocation and life in cities like Los Angeles. Though disruptive, these migrations fostered new intertribal networks and political consciousness, helping lay the groundwork for later activism.

=== Part 5: Becoming Indian (1970–1990) ===
This section centres on the rise of Native activism, including the American Indian Movement (AIM). Treuer covers events such as the 1972 occupation of the Bureau of Indian Affairs and the 1973 standoff at Wounded Knee. Figures like Russell Means, Dennis Banks, and LaDonna Harris feature prominently. Treuer also includes the account of Bobby Matthews, his uncle, who discusses subsistence, community life, and political involvement in northern Minnesota. The era marked a turning point in Native political identity and cultural resurgence.

=== Part 6: Boom City—Tribal Capitalism in the Twenty-First Century ===
Treuer documents the economic strategies tribes adopted, particularly through casinos, natural resource management, and corporate ventures. He profiles the Tulalip Tribes of Washington, who have invested in cannabis, infrastructure, and tech. While some tribes have prospered, others continue to struggle. The section includes commentary from Chelsey Luger, who discusses wellness, health disparities, and cultural continuity in Native communities navigating modern capitalism.

=== Part 7: Digital Indians (1990–2018) ===
The final part explores contemporary Native life, focusing on technology, media, and digital activism. Treuer details the Standing Rock protests against the Dakota Access Pipeline as a convergence of Indigenous rights, environmentalism, and social media. He highlights activists like Chelsey Luger, Thosh Collins, and Sarah Eagle Heart, who use digital platforms to promote cultural resilience. The section portrays Native America as deeply engaged with global issues while rooted in tribal traditions.

== Structure and style ==
The Heartbeat of Wounded Knee blends historical narrative, memoir, and journalistic reporting to construct a multifaceted account of Native American life from 1890 to its release. The book is organized chronologically, beginning with the aftermath of the Wounded Knee Massacre and continuing through key events of the 20th and early 21st centuries, including the Indian Reorganization Act, the Termination Era, the American Indian Movement, and contemporary cultural and political developments.

Treuer intersperses traditional historical analysis with personal reflection and field reporting. Beginning in 2014, he undertook a series of research trips across North America, conducting interviews with native individuals—artists, activists, tribal leaders, and community members—whose lives, he argued, “defy the narrative of disappearance.” These field encounters complement archival research and historical synthesis, resulting in a hybrid form that merges reportage and lived experience with broader socio-political context.

Stylistically, the book diverges from conventional historical works by foregrounding the author's voice and positionality as an Ojibwe person raised on the Leech Lake Indian Reservation. Treuer often uses first-person narration to critique dominant historical narratives and to emphasise Indigenous persistence and renewal.

== Reception ==
The Heartbeat of Wounded Knee was one of Time's must-read books of 2019. Former American president Barack Obama named it as one of his favourite books that year. The New York Times listed it among 2019's 100 most notable books.

The book was a National Book Award Finalist in 2019, cited by the judges as a "comprehensive and sweeping work [that] mandates a rethinking of American history", losing to Sarah M. Broom's The Yellow House. It was shortlisted for the Andrew Carnegie Medals for Excellence in 2020.

Foreign Affairs stated, "Its story of resilience and cultural, economic, and political renaissance among native communities will be revelatory for most readers who are not Native American." Kirkus Reviews described it as a "a politically charged, highly readable history...A welcome modern rejoinder to classics such as God Is Red and Bury My Heart at Wounded Knee." (Note: The original review has a typo, stating: "A welcome modern rejoinder to classics such as God Is Redand Bury My Heart at Wounded Knee.")

The New York Times said, "Treuer's powerful book suggests the need for soul-searching about the meanings of American history and the stories we tell ourselves about this nation's past."

Professor and historian Paul Andrew Hutton, writing in The Washington Post, said the book was more similar to Vine Deloria’s 1969 book Custer Died for Your Sins: An Indian Manifesto than Brown’s book, adding: "In his search for identity — a primary thread of the book — Treuer is seen to embody the contradictions of being Native American. He...moves easily in the world of white America. But he has no wish to relinquish his Ojibwe identity...Treuer is an easy [travel] companion: thoughtful, provocative and challenging. He tells a disturbing yet heroic story that may very well be seen as a definition of 'American exceptionalism.'"

The Arts Fuse said Treuer's reading of "Bury My Heart is at the very least reductive if not largely a mischaracterization. Brown’s book, after all, was itself a counternarrative, rejecting the assumed superiority of European culture along with its disastrous and morally repugnant policy of Manifest Destiny," but added it was "a remarkable and timely book," noting that, "despite the impressive scholarship and archival research" involved, "the real treasure of this book may be the personal experiences of the Native Americans whom he interviewed."

NPR described the retelling of the Wounded Knee massacre as the weakest part of the book, but said it shines "when [Treuer] heads out on the road to meet with his relatives at Leech Lake or members of other tribes across the United States," concluding that it was a "fine and timely work".

== See also ==
- Manifest destiny
- The Rediscovery of America
- Real Indians: Identity and the Survival of Native America
- An Indigenous Peoples' History of the United States
