= Indigenism =

Several different ideologies associated with indigenous peoples

Indigenism can refer to several different ideologies that seek to promote the interests of indigenous peoples. The term is used differently by various scholars and activists, and can be used purely descriptively or carry political connotations. There are a range of ways to define Indigenous identity, including political, legal, cultural, and geographic distinctions. Indigenism can be in some cases seen as ethnic nationalism.

Flag of the American Indian Movement

== As international human rights movement ==
Anthropologist Ronald Niezen uses the term to describe "the international movement that aspires to promote and protect the rights of the world's 'first peoples'."

=== Variation ===
New Zealand scholar Jeffrey Sissons has criticized what he calls "eco-indigenism" on the part of international forums such as the Working Group on Indigenous Peoples, which he claims enforces a link between indigenous peoples and traditional economies, and also confuses the issues faced by New World indigenous, who are mostly urban dwellers and live in states dominated by people descendant from their colonizers, with those faced by ethnic minorities in Asia and Africa who are more likely to live "close to the land" and live in states where the colonizers have long since left (though they may still face persecution from the post-colonial successor state).

== As pan-indigenous political or cultural solidarity ==
As used by ethnic studies scholar Ward Churchill (b. 1947; author of From a Native Son) and Mexican scholar Guillermo Bonfil Batalla (1935–1991), the term refers to the common civilization of which, they argue, all New World indigenous peoples are a part, and to their common "spirit of resistance" to settler colonialism.

== As official policy in Latin American nation-states ==
In some places in Latin America, the term Indigenismo might often be used "to describe the ways that colonial nation-states have formulated their vision of Indigenous social inclusion." In other cases, indigenismo might refer to the research and work related to Indigenous communities.

=== In Brazil ===
In Brazil, an indigenist is a profession undertaken by government officials or civil society organizations who work directly with indigenous communities. Indigenismo would then be a definition for work dedicated to indigenous societies. In the case of this country, Funai (National Indian Foundation), is the official indigenist organ of the state, dedicated to develop and execute the indigenist policy according to the national constitution. Funai originated from the SPI (Service of Protection of Indians), which was a military organ of colonization, dedicated to clearing up areas for white settlers, sometimes with inhumane methods. Under other leaders like Marechal Cândido Rondon, the SPI started incorporating indigenous communities as labour-force, contacting every isolated group on the way, with the goal of occupying the "barren lands" of Brazil, building roads, telegraph lines, and infrastructure in general. The legislation in that time didn't consider indigenous people to be responsible enough to decide for themselves, therefore SPI would make the decisions for the Indians. Over the years it evolved, becoming Funai in the sixties during the military dictatorship, until Brazil became a democracy once again in the late 1980s. Since then, Funai has worked through a more respectful and humanitarian approach, having as its institutional mission to protect indigenous lands from perpetrators, provide aid in cases needed, assist in accessing public policies and several any other activities that are demanded from the government by indigenous people. It is a notably under-funded institution who despite being part of the government, is constantly attacked by sectors of society such as illegal loggers, farmers, businessmen in general interested in the indigenous lands and all the politicians who represent these people. The former president of Brazil, Jair Bolsonaro, was well known for maintaining hostile and racist opinions towards indigenous and indigenist personalities and leaders, indigenous policy and notably indigenous land demarcation, and even towards the Funai itself, having said prior that when elected, he would "put the scythe on Funai's neck".

Besides Funai, there are several institutions dedicated to indigenism in Brazil, most of them being civil society organizations such as NGOs and OSCIPs. Most of them work executing the official indigenist policy, obtaining resources from different sources (government, donations, international funding, others) to develop sustainable activities with indigenous communities, being that some of them even work in partnership with the official indigenist organ Funai, sometimes backing up for the lack of resources (especially human resources) faced by the government institution.

=== Variation ===
Several scholars, notably Alcida Rita Ramos, use the term not only to refer to official policy, but to all social and political interactions between the state or mainstream society and indigenous peoples, whether initiated by the indigenous or by other parties. She, as an indigenist herself, advocates for a compromised and positive work, in which the interventions of the indigenist worker is qualified for positive results in obtaining social justice for societies under the violence of colonial states.

== As approach to scholarship ==
Eva Marie Garroutte uses "Radical Indigenism" to mean an attitude towards scholarship on indigenous peoples that does not treat their culture as a curiosity, or of interest solely in order to study the individuals who practise the culture; instead she argues that indigenous people possess entire philosophies of knowledge capable of generating new knowledge through different models of inquiry from those used in Western philosophy. She presents it as a logical next step to post-colonial theories which seek to question Western "ways of knowing" but have not yet proposed alternatives.

== As ethnic nationalism ==
Indigenism, native nationalism, or indigenous nationalism is a kind of ethnic nationalism emphasizing the group's indigeneity to their homeland. This may be embraced by post-colonial anarchism as well as in national mysticism building on historical or pseudohistorical claims of ethnic continuity.

While New World movements usually go by the name indigenism (notably in Latin America, "indigenismo" is a political force), the term autochthonism is encountered for Eastern European and Central Asian nationalisms.

"Autochthonism" is notorious especially in those parts of Europe formerly under Ottoman control, i.e. the Balkans and Romania (see rise of nationalism under the Ottoman Empire). Originating in the 19th century, autochthonist nationalism affected the area throughout the 20th century. Nichifor Crainic celebrated Gândirea's role in making nationalism and Orthodoxy priorities in Romania's intellectual and political life.

The term 'ethnic' with its meaning of 'ethnic specificity' imprinted in all sorts of expressions of the people, as a mark of its original properties, has been spread for 16 years by the journal Gândirea. The same thing applies to the terms of autochthonism, traditionalism, Orthodoxy, spirituality and many more which became the shared values of our current nationalist language.

— Nichifor Crainic, 1937

=== Variations ===
Indigenism involves the emphasis of certain aspects of history, for example the identification of one of multiple sources of ancestry for a "people". Examples are W. E. B. Du Bois's black nationalism, or nativist arguments in the United States that mestizo people are more indigenous to the United States land than European Americans.

The portrayal of the Christian wars against Al-Andalus as a Reconquista, or "reconquest" is an indigenist nationalist trope that evokes Iberia's pre-Muslim past. The Hutu Power ideology posited that the Hutu were the first, and therefore the legitimate, inhabitants of Rwanda, justifying the extermination of the Tutsi. The Arab–Israeli conflict involves competing claims to indigeneity, with modern disputants to territory claiming a direct line of descent to its ancient inhabitant peoples such as the Israelites, the Philistines and the Canaanites.

- Indigenist anarchism
  - Pan-Slavism: Mikhail Bakunin
  - Post-colonial anarchism: Anarchist People of Color, Black anarchism, Afrocentrism
  - Anarchism in Africa: Négritude
  - Indigenous American: Dylan Miner (Métis), Mujeres Creando (Bolivia), Milagro Sala (Argentina)
  - Tino rangatiratanga in New Zealand
- "Continuity theories":
  - Armenian Nationalism, The belief of Urartians being ancestors of ancient Armenians
  - Assyrianism
  - Croatian Illyrian movement
  - Dacianism, a national mysticism linking modern Romania to the ancient Dacians
  - English nationalist support for the theory that English is indigenous to Britain
  - Finnic settlement continuity theory: see Baltic Finns
  - Gaul-French continuity theory (France)
  - Germanic-German continuity theory (Rudolf Much, Otto Höfler)
  - Illyrian-Albanian continuity theory: see origin of the Albanians and Albanian nationalism
  - India:
    - Indigenous Aryans, a hypothesis that puts the deep historical origins of the Aryan people on the Indian subcontinent (Hindu nationalism)
  - Korean nationalism (minjok)
  - continuity theories in Kurdish nationalism
  - Irish nationalism since 1900 has emphasised the Gaelic origin of most Irish people
  - Lusitanianism (Portuguese)
  - Macedonism (Macedonian Slavs)
  - Montagnard nationalism
  - Paleolithic continuity theory and Uralic Continuity Theory (Mario Alinei)
  - Phoenicianism
  - Ryukyu independence movement
  - Sarmatian-Polish continuity theory: see Sarmatism
  - Slovenian Venetic theory
  - continuity theories in Syrian nationalism
  - Taiwanese nationalism based on Taiwanese indigenous peoples
  - Turkish Anatolianism

== See also ==
- Colonial mentality
- Eco-nationalism
- Richard J. F. Day
- Declaration on the Rights of Indigenous Peoples
- Historiography and nationalism
- Identity politics
- Indianism (arts), Brazil
- Indigenization
- Irredentism
- Land Back
- Left-wing Nationalism
- Localism (politics)
- Multiethnic Indigenist Party of Nicaragua
