= Native Son (disambiguation) =

Native Son is a 1940 novel by Richard Wright.

Native Son(s) may also refer to:

== Film and theatre ==
=== Adaptations of Richard Wright's novel ===
- Native Son (play), a 1941 Broadway drama
- Native Son (1951 film), an Argentine film directed by Pierre Chenal
- Native Son (1986 film), an American film directed by Jerrold Freedman
- Native Son (2019 film), an American film directed by Rashid Johnson

=== Other works ===
- Native Son (2010 film), a British film from Scotland, written and directed by Scott Graham

== Music ==
- Native Son (band), a Japanese jazz band
- Native Son (album), or the title song, by the Judybats, 1991
- Native Sons (Loggins and Messina album), or the title song, "Native Son", 1976
- Native Sons (The Long Ryders album), 1984
- Native Sons (Los Lobos album), 2021
- "Native Son", a song by Alter Bridge from Walk the Sky
- "Native Son", a song by Bryan Adams from Into the Fire
- "Native Son", a song by James Taylor from New Moon Shine
- "Native Son", a song by U2 from Unreleased and Rare

== Sports ==
- Native Sons (lacrosse), an American and Iroquois box lacrosse team
- Nickel Centre Native Sons, a Canadian junior A ice hockey team 1976–1986
- Toronto Native Sons, a Canadian junior ice hockey team 1933–1942

== See also ==
- Native Sons of Canada, a Canadian nativist group
- Native Sons of the Golden West, a Californian group
- From a Native Son, a book by Ward Churchill
