= Cod (disambiguation) =

Cod is the common name for fish of the genus Gadus, as well as being used to refer to several other varieties of fish.

Cod or COD may also refer to:

== Books ==
- A Century of Dishonor, a non-fiction book by Helen Hunt Jackson, first published in 1881
- Concise Oxford Dictionary, dictionary of the English language
- Cod: A Biography of the Fish That Changed the World, a 1997 book by Mark Kurlansky

== Computing ==
- Caldera OpenDOS, a former open source distribution of DR-DOS
- Cluster on die, a feature available in certain Haswell-EP CPUs that provides support for logical CPU partitioning

== Education ==
- College of DuPage, a community college in Illinois
- College of the Desert, a community college in California

== Entertainment ==
- C.O.D. (1914 film), a short comedy film
- C.O.D. (1932 film), a British crime film
- "C.O.D." (Law & Order), 325th episode of NBC's legal drama
- "C.O.D." (Person of Interest), an episode of the American TV series Person of Interest
- An abbreviation for Call of Duty, a first-person shooter video game franchise

== Finance and commerce ==
- Cancellation-of-debt income, a U.S. tax concept
- Cash on delivery or collect on delivery, a type of financial transaction
- Certificate of deposit, a financial instrument

== Music ==
- C.O.D. (album), a 1992 album by Saint Vitus
- C.O.D. (musician) (?–2012), American electro musician
- "C.O.D.", a 1981 song by AC/DC from the album For Those About to Rock We Salute You
- C.O.D., a vinyl release by Mark Mulcahy

== Science ==
- Catastrophic optical damage, a laser failure mode
- Cause of death, essential data on a governmental death certificate
- Chemical oxygen demand, a water quality measure
- Chitin disaccharide deacetylase, an enzyme
- Cordoba Durchmusterung, an astrometric survey
- Crystallography Open Database, a database of crystal structures
- Cyclooctadiene, a chemical compound
  - 1,5-Cyclooctadiene, a specific isomer of cyclooctadiene

== Transport ==
- USS Cod, a U.S. Navy submarine
- Carrier onboard delivery, a type of military aircraft
- Yellowstone Regional Airport, IATA code COD

== Other uses ==
- Cocama language, an ISO 639-3 code
- Cód, the Hungarian name for Sadu, Romania
- Cod stronghold, a World War II German stronghold in Hermanville-sur-Mer, France
- The Cods, a faction in the Hook and Cod wars of 14th–15th century Holland
- The male genitalia, as in the word codpiece
- City of Dreams Macau, a casino resort in Cotai, Macau, China
- Cod Latin, fake Latin
- Codecision procedure
- Commercial operation date
- DR Congo national football team, FIFA country code

== See also ==
- Cape Cod (disambiguation)
- Codd, a surname
- Camp bed, a cot
