= MBIM =

MBIM may refer to:

- Majlis Bahasa Indonesia-Malaysia, former name of the regional language organization Majlis Bahasa Brunei-Indonesia-Malaysia
- Member of the British Institute of Management, now the Chartered Management Institute
