= Codd =

Codd is a surname. Notable people with the surname include:

- Bernard Codd (1934–2013), English motorcycle racer
- Edgar F. Codd (1923–2003), British computer scientist
- Frederick Codd (1831–1888), English Gothic revival architect
- Hiram Codd (1838–1887), English engineer who invented and patented the Codd Bottle
- Leslie Codd (1908–1999), South African botanist
- Mike Codd (born 1939), former senior Australian public servant
- Ruth Codd (born 1996), Irish actress and former TikToker

== Fictional characters ==
- Tom Codd, a character in the 1937 British comedy movie Beauty and the Barge

== See also ==
- Cod (disambiguation)
- Codd-neck bottle
- Codd's 12 rules
