= Cape Codder =

Cape Codder can denote:

- A resident or native of Cape Cod
- The Cape Codder (train), a former Amtrak train
- The Cape Codder (NH train), a former New York, New Haven and Hartford Railroad train
- Cape Codder (cocktail), a cocktail
- The Cape Codders, a former hockey team

== See also ==
- Cape Cod (disambiguation)
