= HRD =

HRD may refer to:

== Science and medicine ==
- Hertzsprung–Russell diagram, in astronomy
- Homologous recombination deficiency
- Hurricane Research Division, of the United States National Oceanic and Atmospheric Administration

== Sport ==
- Home Run Derby, Major League Baseball
- Humboldt Roller Derby
- Houston Roller Derby
- Hurdles

== Places ==
- Huanghe River Delta, China; the river delta of the Yellow River
- Harlem River Drive, New York City, New York State, USA
- Harden railway station (station code HRD), New South Wales, Australia
- Harling Road railway station (station code HRD), England, UK
- Harsud railway station (station code HRD), Madhya Pradesh, India

== Other uses ==
- Croatian dinar (ISO currency code HRD), a former currency of Croatia
- Handel Reference Database
- Hood River Distillers
- HRD, a Rockwell scale of materials' hardness
- HRD Motorcycles, a British motorcycle manufacturer
- Human remains detection
- Human resource development
- Human rights defender
