= Gramsci Is Dead =

2005 English-language book by Richard JF Day

- Author: Richard J. F. Day
- Subject: Postanarchism
- Publisher: Pluto Press
- Publication date: September 2005
- Pages: 264

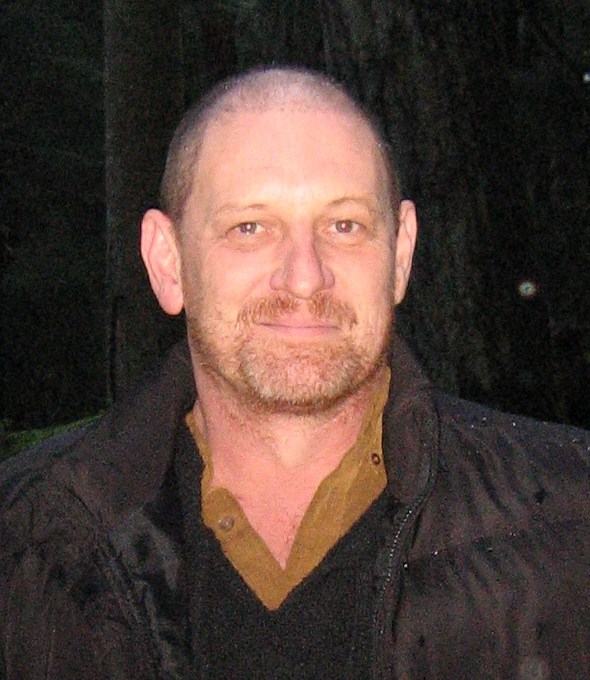
Richard J. F. Day

Gramsci Is Dead: Anarchist Currents in the Newest Social Movements is a book by Richard J. F. Day about whether social movements should pursue cultural hegemony. Gabriel Kuhn considered Day to be "among a new generation of anarchist academics challenging Marxist dominance at the universities."

== See also ==
- Antonio Gramsci
