= Cape Cod (disambiguation) =

Cape Cod is a peninsula in southeastern Massachusetts.

Cape Cod may also refer to:

- Cape Cod (house), an architectural style, originating in New England in the 17th century
- Cape Cod style, an 1800s lighthouse design once typical of Cape Cod that today only exists on the U.S. West Coast
- Cape Cod National Seashore, a federally protected seashore in Massachusetts
- "Old Cape Cod", a 1957 song popularized by Patti Page
- Cape Codder (cocktail), an alcoholic beverage
- Cape Cod Potato Chips, an American potato chip brand

== See also ==
- Cape Codder (disambiguation)
