= Margaret Treuer =

American judge and lawyer

- Born: Margaret Seelye; November 19, 1943; Cass Lake, Minnesota, U.S.
- Died: March 18, 2020 (aged 76); Bena, Minnesota, U.S.
- Other names: Giiwedinookwe (North Wind Woman); Aazhideyaashiikwe (Crossing Flight Woman)
- Occupations: Judge, lawyer
- Children: 4, including Anton and David

Margaret "Peggy" Seelye Treuer (November 19, 1943 – March 18, 2020) was an American Ojibwe judge and lawyer. She was Minnesota's first female Native American lawyer, working as a federal magistrate and tribal court judge for the Bois Forte Band of Chippewa, the Red Lake Nation, and the Leech Lake Indian Reservation. A member of the Leech Lake Band of Ojibwe, she volunteered with the Native American Rights Fund and worked for the reestablishment of the Menominee Indian Reservation. She earned degrees from the law school of the Catholic University of America and St. Luke's School of Nursing. She received a Lifetime Achievement Award from the National Association of Women Judges.

== Early life and education ==
Margaret Seelye was born on the Leech Lake Indian Reservation in Cass Lake, Minnesota, on November 19, 1943, one of five children of Luella and Eugene Seelye. She was a member of the Turtle Clan of the Leech Lake Band of Ojibwe. Her Ojibwe names were Giiwedinookwe (North Wind Woman) and Aazhideyaashiikwe (Crossing Flight Woman). Her family was poor, living on a subsistence diet in a one-room cabin next to Lake Winnibigoshish in Bena. When she was a young child, two social workers made an unsuccessful and illegal attempt to remove her from her family. When she was 12 years old, she recalled having her wild rice harvest stolen by the sheriff, who confiscated it with the excuse that she had been ricing illegally. In 1961 she graduated from Cass Lake High School.

She attended St. Luke's School of Nursing in Duluth, earning a degree before moving to St. Cloud where she was employed as a nurse for a year. She then advocated for tribal health programs, founding a community health program for the Leech Lake Reservation as well as a comprehensive health program on the Red Lake Indian Reservation. She later wrote a grant for Red Lake Reservation's first nursing program. She married and moved to Washington, D.C. where she attended Columbus School of Law, the law school of the Catholic University of America.

== Career ==
In Washington, D.C., Treuer worked for the reestablishment of the Menominee Indian Reservation alongside Silvia Wilbur and Ada Deer. She also volunteered with the Native American Rights Fund. She evaluated tribal courts for the Bureau of Indian Affairs and was a tribal advocate for the Housing Assistance Council's low-income program. She became Minnesota's first female Native American lawyer in 1977. Upon her return to Minnesota, she established a legal practice with Paul Day that was Minnesota's first Native American law firm.

Treuer worked as a lawyer, tribal court judge, and federal magistrate for many years. She was a lawyer for Red Lake schools and a contract tribal judge for the Bois Forte Band of Chippewa in the 1980s. She served as a judge for the Red Lake Nation in the 1990s and for the Leech Lake Reservation beginning in 1998. In 1995, she made a statement before the United States Senate Committee on Indian Affairs concerning the Indian Tribal Justice Act.

Treuer received a Lifetime Achievement Award from the National Association of Women Judges in 2012.

== Personal life ==
Margaret met Robert Treuer (d. 2016), an Austrian immigrant and Holocaust survivor, on the Red Lake Indian Reservation. They married and moved to Washington, D.C. They had four children, including Anton and David.

Treuer died on March 18, 2020, in Bena, Minnesota.
