= Dee Brown (writer) =

American writer (1908–2002)

- Born: Dorris Alexander Brown; February 29, 1908; Alberta, Louisiana, U.S.
- Died: December 12, 2002 (aged 94); Little Rock, Arkansas, U.S.
- Education: University of Illinois Urbana-Champaign (MLS)
- Occupations: Librarian; historian; author
- Spouse: Sally Stroud
- Children: 2

Dorris Alexander "Dee" Brown (February 29, 1908 – December 12, 2002) was an American novelist, historian, and librarian. His most famous work, Bury My Heart at Wounded Knee (1970), details the history of the United States' westward colonization of the continent between 1860 and 1890 from the point of view of Native Americans.

== Personal life ==
Born on Leap Year Day 1908 in Alberta, Louisiana, a sawmill town, Brown grew up in Ouachita County, Arkansas, which experienced an oil boom when he was thirteen years old. Brown's mother later relocated to Little Rock so he and his brother and two sisters could attend a better high school. He spent much time in the public library reading the three-volume History of the Expedition under the Command of Captains Lewis and Clark which saw him develop an interest in the American West. He also discovered the works of Sherwood Anderson and John Dos Passos, and later William Faulkner and Joseph Conrad. He cited these authors as those most influential on his own work.

While attending home games by the baseball team the Little Rock Travelers, he became acquainted with Moses Yellowhorse, a pitcher. His lifelong friendship with Yellowhorse shaped viewpoint on the American West and its history, as well as his writing.

He worked as a printer and reporter in Harrison, Arkansas, and decided to continue his education at Arkansas State Teachers College in Conway, Arkansas. His mentor, the history professor Dean D. McBrien, helped give him the idea to become a writer. They traveled west along with other students on two occasions in a Model T Ford. On campus, Brown worked as an editor to the student newspaper and was a student assistant in the library. The latter convinced him that he should become a librarian.

In the midst of the Great Depression he went to George Washington University in Washington, D.C. for graduate study. Brown worked part-time for J. Willard Marriott, attended classes, and married Sally Stroud (another graduate of Arkansas State Teachers College). Eventually he became a library assistant for the U.S. Department of Agriculture from 1934 to 1942. He lived at 1717 R Street NW, in the Dupont Circle neighborhood.

Brown's first novel was a satire of New Deal bureaucracy, but it was not published, owing to the bombing of Pearl Harbor. The publisher suggested more "patriotic" reading material. He responded with Wave High The Banner, a fictionalized account of the life of Davy Crockett (who was an acquaintance of his great-grandfather). A few months after its publication, he was drafted into the U.S. Army where he met Martin Schmitt, with whom he collaborated on several works after the war. During the war, Brown worked for the United States Department of War as a librarian and never went overseas.

From 1948 to 1972, he was an agriculture librarian at the University of Illinois at Urbana–Champaign, where he had gained a master's degree in library science, became a professor, and raised a son, Mitchell, and daughter, Linda, with his wife Sally.

As a part-time writer, he published nine books, three fiction and six nonfiction, by the end of the 1950s. During the 1960s, he completed eight more including The Galvanized Yankees, which Brown described as requiring more research than any of his other books, and The Year of the Century: 1876, which he described as his personal favorite. During 1971, his book Bury My Heart at Wounded Knee became a best-seller. Many readers assumed that Brown was of Native American heritage.

During 1973, Brown and his wife retired in Little Rock, Arkansas, where he devoted his time to writing. His later works include Creek Mary's Blood, a novel telling of several generations of a family descended from one Creek woman, and Hear That Lonesome Whistle Blow, which is set during the construction of the western railroads. His last book-length work, The Way To Bright Star, is a picaresque novel set during the American Civil War. He never completed its sequel, which was to feature P. T. Barnum and Abraham Lincoln.

Brown died at the age of 94 in Little Rock, Arkansas. His remains are interred in Urbana, Illinois, along with those of his wife.

== Legacy ==
The Central Arkansas Library System named a branch library in Little Rock, Arkansas for him.

== Works ==
=== Histories ===
- Fighting Indians of the West (1948) with Martin F. Schmitt
- Trail Driving Days (1952) with Martin F. Schmitt
- Grierson's Raid (1954)
- Settlers' West (1955) with Martin F. Schmitt
- The Gentle Tamers: Women of the Old Wild West (1958)
- The Bold Cavaliers: Morgan's Second Kentucky Cavalry Raiders (1959). Republished as Morgan's Raiders (1995)
- The Fetterman Massacre (1962)
- The Galvanized Yankees (1963). Republished (1986)
- Showdown at Little Big Horn (1964)
- The Year of the Century: 1876 (1966)
- Bury My Heart at Wounded Knee (1970)
- Fort Phil Kearny: An American Saga (1971). First published 1962. Republished as The Fetterman Massacre (1974)
- Andrew Jackson and the Battle of New Orleans (1972)
- The Westerners (1974)
- Hear That Lonesome Whistle Blow (1977)
- Wondrous Times on the Frontier (1991)
- The American West (1994). Collected excerpts from earlier books co-authored by Schmitt
- Great Documents in American Indian History (1995)

=== Novels ===
- Wave High The Banner (1942)
- Yellowhorse (1956)
- Cavalry Scout (1958)
- They Went Thataway (1960). Republished as Pardon My Pandemonium (1984)
- The Girl from Fort Wicked (1964)
- Action at Beecher Island (1967)
- Creek Mary’s Blood (1980)
- Killdeer Mountain (1983)
- Conspiracy of Knaves (1986)
- The Way To Bright Star (1998)

=== Other ===
- Tales of the Warrior Ants (1973). For young people
- American Spa: Hot Springs, Arkansas (1982). Illustrated history
- Dee Brown's Folktales of the Native American: Retold for Our Times (1993). Originally published as Teepee Tales (1979)
- When the Century Was Young (1993). Memoir
- Images of the Old West (1996)
