= Anton Treuer =

American academic and author

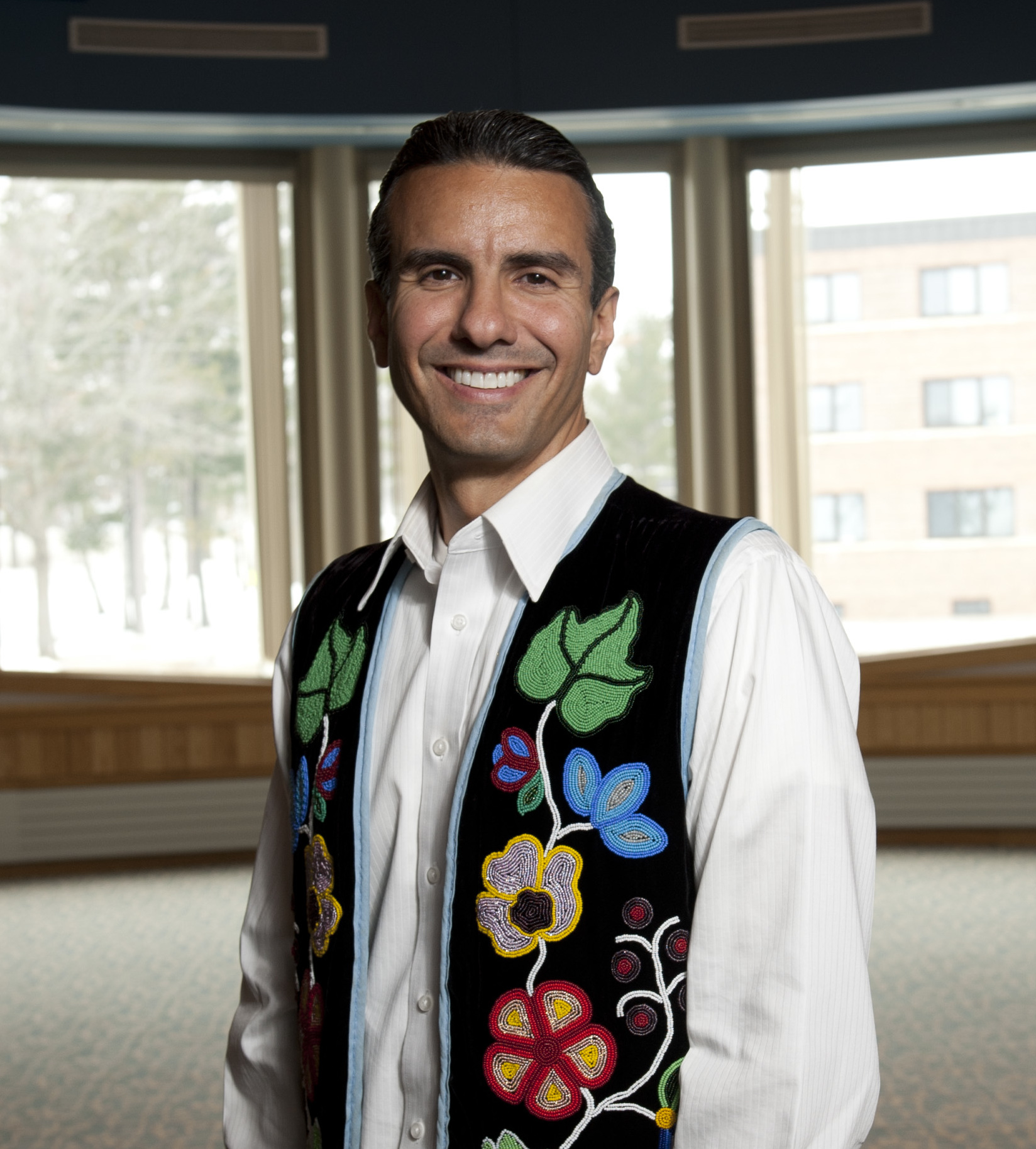
- Treuer in 2014
- Born: 1969 (age 56–57); Washington, D.C., U.S.
- Parent: Margaret Treuer
- Relatives: David Treuer (brother)

Academic background
- Education: Princeton University (B.A., M.A.); University of Minnesota (Ph.D.)

Academic work
- Discipline: Linguist
- Sub-discipline: History
- Institutions: Bemidji State University (1999–current)
- Website: https://antontreuer.com/

Anton Treuer (Ojibwe name Waagosh "fox") is an American academic and author specializing in the Ojibwe language and American Indian studies. He is professor of Ojibwe at Bemidji State University, Minnesota, and a 2008 Guggenheim Fellow.

== Early life and education ==
Anton Treuer was born in 1969 in Washington, D.C. to Robert and Margaret Treuer. Robert Treuer was an Austrian Jew and Holocaust survivor. Margaret Treuer was an enrolled member of the White Earth Ojibwe Nation and a resident of the Leech Lake Reservation. She was a tribal judge and was the first female Indian attorney in Minnesota. Anton Treuer grew up in and around the Leech Lake Reservation in Minnesota and went to high school in Bemidji. He earned a BA from Princeton University in 1991 and an MA in 1994 and PhD in 1996 from the University of Minnesota.

His brother, David Treuer, is also a writer and academic.

== Academic career and work ==
Treuer has authored or edited more than 20 books. He also edits the only academic journal about the Ojibwe language, the Oshkaabewis Native Journal. After serving as Assistant Professor of History at the University of Wisconsin-Milwaukee from 1996–2000, Treuer returned to his home town of Bemidji as professor of Ojibwe, a position he still holds today.

Treuer's publications and academic work have remained very broad. The Assassination of Hole in the Day was a major historical research project. Everything You Wanted to Know About Indians But Were Afraid to Ask is designed as a broadly accessible general reader book on American Indians. He has also published extensively in linguistics and Ojibwe language. His first work of fiction, Where Wolves Don't Die was released in 2024. He is one of the most prolific scholars of Ojibwe, and at the forefront of a movement to textualize this formerly oral language in hopes of preserving and revitalizing it. Treuer has also worked extensively with the Ojibwe language immersion efforts underway in Minnesota, Wisconsin, and Ontario. He is part of a team of scholars developing Rosetta Stone for Ojibwe with the Mille Lacs Band of Ojibwe. In 2024, the Waadookodaading Ojibwe Language Institute where Treuer serves at Vice President of the Board received a $1.5 million dollar grant from MacKenzie Scott. Treuer is actively building an Ojibwe teacher training program at Bemidji State University. He has also presented all over the United States, Canada, and in several other countries on his publications, cultural competence and equity, tribal sovereignty and history, Ojibwe language and culture, and strategies for addressing the "achievement gap".

== Publications ==
- Living Our Language: Ojibwe Tales and Oral Histories (ed.), Minnesota Historical Society Press, 2001
- Ojibwe in Minnesota, Minnesota Historical Society, 2010.
- The Assassination of Hole in the Day, Borealis, 2012
- Everything You Wanted to Know About Indians But Were Afraid to Ask, Minnesota Historical Society Press, 2012.
- Atlas of Indian Nations, National Geographic Society, 2014
- Warrior Nation: A History of the Red Lake Ojibwe, Minnesota Historical Society Press, 2015.
- The Indian Wars: Battles, Bloodshed, and the Fight for Freedom on the American Frontier, National Geographic, 2017.
- The Language Warrior's Manifesto: How to Keep Our Languages Alive No Matter the Odds, Minnesota Historical Society Press, 2020 (finalist for the 2021 Minnesota Book Awards.)
- The Cultural Toolbox: Traditional Ojibwe Living in the Modern World, Minnesota Historical Society Press, 2021.
- Where Wolves Don’t Die, 2024
- Mino-doodaading: Dibaajimowinan Ji-mino-ayaang, 2013.
- Awesiinyensag: Dibaajimowinan Ji-gikinoo’amaageng, 2010, 2020.
- Naadamaading: Dibaajimowinan Ji-nisidotaading, 2013
- Ezhichigeng: Ojibwe Word List, 2011.
- Wiijikiiwending, 2014.
- Aaniin Ekidong: Ojibwe Vocabulary Project, 2010.
- Omaa Akiing, 1996.
- Akawe Niwii-tibaajim, 2020.
- Nishiimeyinaanig, 2020.
- Anooj Inaajimod, 2020.
- Gaa-pi-izhiwebak, 2020.
- Ge-ni-aabadak Giniigaaniiminaang, 2020.

== Awards ==
- Sally Ordway Irvine Award for Distinguished Service in Education, 2011
- Pathfinder Award by Association of Tribal Archives, Libraries, and Museums, 2018
