= From a Native Son =

1996 book by Ward Churchill

- Author: Ward Churchill
- Language: English
- Publisher: South End Press
- Publication date: 1996
- ISBN: 0-89608-554-6

From a Native Son: Selected Essays on Indigenism, 1985–1995 is a 1996 book by Ward Churchill. It is a collection of 23 previously published essays on various topics relevant to the indigenous peoples of the Americas (particularly of North America) in relation to their experience of being colonized. It is introduced by Howard Zinn.

== Publishing information ==
It was published by South End Press in 1996 as a 588-page hardcover (ISBN 0-89608-554-6) and paperback (ISBN 0-89608-553-8).

== Synopsis ==
The book brings together a decade of Churchill's writings on American Indian history, culture, and political activism. The essays explore the themes "of genocide in the Americas, historical/legal (re)interpretation of the processes of conquest and colonization, literary/cinematic criticism, and the positing of indigenist alternatives to the status quo." The author gives his assessments of how Indians are represented on film, in literature, and in academic institutions in order to support his case for believing in an ongoing "systematic cultural extermination". He analyses "Indian resistance--as it occurs in art, cultural practice, and activist struggle..."

The book is dedicated "for Aunt Bonnie, who inspired me more than she knew..."

== Criticism ==
The scholar Elizabeth Zahrt Geib, writing in Feminist Economics, stated that though the book was "thoroughly researched" and benefited from a "highly articulate hypothesis", she ultimately feared that due to the author presuming a familiarity with Postmodern theory on the part of the reader, that "some of the impacts of the essays could be lost on readers."

== Awards ==
The book won the 1997 Gustavus Myers Award for Outstanding Books on Human Rights.

== Contents ==
- Introduction by Howard Zinn
- Deconstructing the Columbus Myth: Was the "Great Discoverer" Italian or Spanish, Nazi or Jew?
- Since Predator Came: A Survey of Native North America Since 1492
- The Earth is Our Mother: Struggles for American Indian Land and Liberation in the Contemporary United States
- Genocide in Arizona?: The "Navajo-Hopi Land Dispute" in Perspective
- Native North America: The Political Economy of Radioactive Colonialism, with Winona LaDuke
- Like Sand in the Wind: The Making of an American Indian Diaspora in the United States
- Death Squads in the United States: Confessions of a Government Terrorist
- White Studies: The Intellectual Imperialism of U.S. Higher Education
- Literature and the Colonization of American Indians
- A Little Matter of Genocide: Colonialism and the Expropriation of Indigenous Spiritual Tradition in Academia
- Another Dry White Season: Jerry Mander's In the Absence of the Sacred
- Spiritual Hucksterism: The Rise of the Plastic Medicine Men
- Indians "R" Us: Reflections on the "Men's Movement"
- Fantasies of the Master Race: Categories of Stereotyping American Indians in Film
- Lawrence of South Dakota: Dances with Wolves and the Maintenance of the American Empire
- And They Did It Like Dogs in the Dirt ...: An Indigenist Analysis of Black Robe
- Let's Spread the "Fun" Around: The Issue of Sports Team Names and Mascots
- In the Matter of Julius Streicher: Applying Nuremberg Standards to the United States
- Semantic Masturbation on the Left: A Barrier to Unity and Action
- False Promises: An Indigenist Perspective on Marxist Theory and Practice
- Nobody's Pet Poodle: Jimmie Durham, an Artist for Native North America
- Another Vision of America: Simon J. Ortiz's From Sand Creek
- I Am Indigenist: Notes on the Ideology of the Fourth World
- Works by Author, 1980-1996
- Index
