= David Treuer =

American writer, critic, and academic (born 1970)

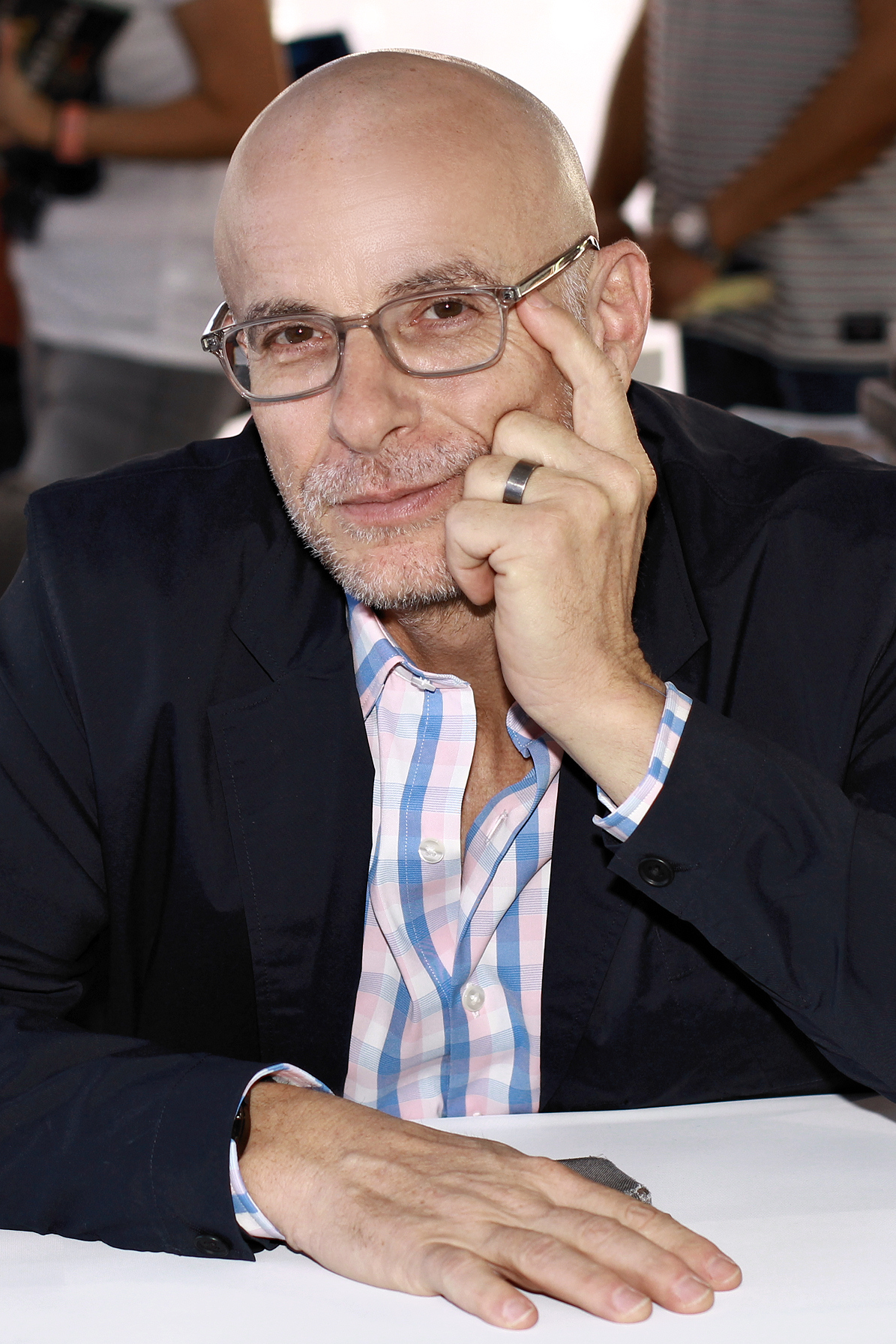
- Treuer in 2019
- Born: 1970 (age 55–56); Washington, D.C., United States
- Education: Princeton University (BA); University of Michigan (PhD)
- Occupations: Writer; critic; academic
- Parent: Margaret Treuer
- Relatives: Anton Treuer (brother)
- Website: davidtreuer.com

David Treuer (born 1970) is an American writer, critic, and academic. As of 2026, he has published eight books, with his most recent,The Savage Mind: An American Legacy, released on October 6, 2026. His 2019 book, The Heartbeat of Wounded Knee: Native America from 1890 to the Present, was a National Book Award Finalist. Since 2010 he has been a professor of literature at University of Southern California.

In 2006 his novel The Translation of Dr. Apelles was ranked as among the best of the year by The Washington Post and other major publications. That year he also published a collection of essays on literature, Native American Fiction: A Users Manual, which stirred controversy by criticizing major writers of the tradition. He concluded, "Native American fiction does not exist."

Treuer and his brother Anton have been leaders in language preservation. They are working on an Ojibwe language grammar.

== Early life and education ==
David Treuer was born in Washington, D.C. His mother, Margaret Seelye, was an Ojibwe woman who first worked as a nurse and later became a lawyer. His parents met when his father, Robert Treuer, an Austrian Jewish survivor of the Holocaust, was teaching high school on her reservation.

When they were in Washington, his father worked for the federal government and his mother attended law school at Catholic University. They returned to his mother's Leech Lake Reservation, Minnesota, where the young Treuer, and his older brother, Anton Treuer were raised. They both are enrolled Ojibwe. Their mother eventually became a tribal court judge at the reservation.

Treuer attended Princeton University; he graduated in 1992 after writing two senior theses, one in the anthropology department and one in the Princeton Program in Creative Writing. He studied writing at Princeton with the authors Joanna Scott and Paul Muldoon; his thesis advisor in that program was the Nobel Prize-winning author Toni Morrison. He received his Ph.D. in anthropology from the University of Michigan in 1999.

== Academic career ==
He has taught English at the University of Minnesota in Minneapolis, and at the University of Wisconsin–Milwaukee. He also taught Creative Writing for a semester at Scripps College in Claremont, California, as the Mary Routt Chair of Writing. In 2010 Treuer moved to the University of Southern California, where he is a Professor of Literature and teaches in the Creative Writing & Literature PhD program.

== Literary career ==
Treuer has published stories and essays in Esquire, TriQuarterly, The Washington Post, Los Angeles Times, "The New York Times," "Lucky Peach," The Atlantic, and Slate.com.

He published his first novel, Little, in 1995, which features multiple narrators and points of view. His second, The Hiawatha, followed in 1999. It was named for a fleet of trains operated by the Chicago, Milwaukee, St. Paul and Pacific Railroad (and by allusion the epic poem The Song of Hiawatha by Henry Wadsworth Longfellow.) The novel features a Native American family who migrate to Minneapolis in the mid-twentieth century under the federally sponsored urban relocation program. One of two brothers works on the railroad.

In the fall of 2006, Treuer published his third novel, The Translation of Dr Apelles. The Native American professor is presented as a translator who lives alone and works with an unnamed language. He confounds many expectations of Native American characters. Dnitia Smith said that Appelles is "untranslated, a man who cannot make sense of his own history, his personal narrative, perhaps because it falls between two cultures, two languages." Brian Hall wrote, "The hidden theme of his novel is that fiction is all about games, lies and feints, about the heightened pleasure we can derive from a narrative when we recognize that it is artful." Treuer uses a double narrative with allusions to several classical and other Western works to pull the novel (and Native American literature) into the mainstream.

That year, Treuer also published a book of essays, entitled Native American Fiction: A User's Manual (2006). It was controversial because he challenged the work of major writers and urged readers to see the genre of "Native American Fiction" as closely linked to many other literatures in English, and not as a "cultural artifact" of historic Indian culture. He argues against Native American writing being read as ethnography rather than literature.

He criticized "the precious way that Indians are portrayed in even the most well-meaning books and movies." This analysis included the works of such notable authors as Sherman Alexie, Louise Erdrich, Leslie Marmon Silko or James Welch whose work he thought sometimes perpetuated stereotypes and misrepresented historic cultures. In sum, he said that "Native American literature hasn't progressed as quickly as it should have beyond cultural stereotypes."

In 2012, Treuer published his fourth work, Rez Life: An Indian's Journey Through Reservation Life, which combines memoir with journalism about reservations. He conveys material of his own experience, as well as examining issues on other reservations, including federal policies and Indian sovereignty, and cronyism in tribal governments.

== Revival of Ojibwe ==
Treuer has a deep interest in the Ojibwe language and culture. He is working with his older brother, Anton Treuer, on a grammar as a way to preserve and extend the language. His brother has been studying it since high school.

Treuer has written that "it's not clear why so many Indian critics and novelists suggest that stories, even great ones, in English by writers whose only language is English are somehow 'Indian stories' that store the kernels of culture." He likens that to believing that long abandoned seeds found in caves can sprout and bear produce. He believes that Native American cultures are threatened if their writers have only English to use as a language; he contends that the tribes need their own languages to perpetuate their cultures.

== Awards ==
- 2019 National Book Award Finalist for The Heartbeat of Wounded Knee
- 2014 NACF Literature Fellowship
- Pushcart Prize
- 1996 Minnesota Book Award for Little (1995)
- He has received an NEH Fellowship and a Guggenheim Fellowship.
- The Translation of Dr Apelles was named a "Best Book for 2006" by The Washington Post, Minneapolis Star Tribune, Time Out Chicago, and City Pages.

== Books ==
- Little: A Novel (1995)
- The Hiawatha: A Novel. Picador. 1999. ISBN 978-1-4668-5017-0.
- The Translation of Dr Apelles: A Love Story. Vintage Contemporaries/Vintage Books. 2006. ISBN 978-0-307-38662-5.
- Native American Fiction: A User's Manual Macmillan, 2006, ISBN 9781555970789
- Rez Life: An Indian's Journey Through Reservation Life. Grove/Atlantic, Incorporated. February 1, 2012. ISBN 978-0-8021-9489-3.
- Prudence, 2015. Riverhead. ISBN 9781594633089
- The Heartbeat of Wounded Knee: Native America from 1890 to the Present. Riverhead Books. January 22, 2019. ISBN 978-1594633157.
- The Savage Mind: An American Legacy. Little, Brown and Company. October 6, 2026. ISBN 978-0-316-61265-4

== Articles ==
- "A language too beautiful to lose", Los Angeles Times, February 3, 2008.
- "Return the National Parks to the Tribes", The Atlantic, May 2021.
- "'A Sadness I Can't Carry': The Story Of The Drum", New York Times, October 11, 2021.
- "Portrait of the Coyote as a Young Man", Harper's Magazine, November 2021.
- "Adrift Between My Parents' Two Americas", New York Times, July 18, 2022.
- "Do We Have the History of Native Americans Backward?", New Yorker, November 7, 2022.

== See also ==
- List of Native American jurists
