= Real Indians: Identity and the Survival of Native America =

2003 book by Eva Marie Garroutte

- Author: Eva Marie Garroutte
- Language: English
- Genre: Non-fiction
- Publisher: University of California Press
- Publication date: 2003
- Pages: 223
- ISBN: 978-0-5202-1310-4

Real Indians: Identity and the Survival of Native America is a 2003 book by Cherokee sociologist Eva Marie Garroutte. It was published in University of California Press. It explores the complexities of Native American identity through legal, biological, and cultural lenses, revealing the challenges Indigenous people face in proving their identity according to non-Native criteria. Garroutte proposes "radical indigenism" as a solution, advocating for Native communities to reclaim identity definitions rooted in tribal philosophies, kinship, and reciprocal ethics, emphasizing the importance of community-driven knowledge and relationships to ancestry. The book received several literary reviews.

Garroutte, an enrolled member of the Cherokee Nation and research professor of sociology at Boston College, focuses on Native American issues, ethnic identity, religion, and health disparities, particularly in aging populations. She has also worked with Cherokee Nation Health Services on projects funded by the National Institute on Aging to explore medical communication among American Indian elders and has served as an Area Commissioner of Bureau of Indian Affairs in Tulsa, Oklahoma. Garroutte earned a Ph.D. in sociology from Princeton University in 1993. Her dissertation was titled, Language and Cultural Authority: Nineteenth-Century Science and the Colonization of Religious Discourse. She is married to Xavier Lopez.
