= Majlis Bahasa Brunei-Indonesia-Malaysia =

Regional language organization

MABBIM (Majlis Bahasa Brunei-Indonesia-Malaysia, "Language Council of Brunei-Indonesia-Malaysia") is a regional language organization which is formed to plan and monitor the development of the Malay language and its many national standards in the region. It consists of three countries where the language is predominately used – Brunei, Indonesia and Malaysia.

It was founded as MBIM (Majlis Bahasa Indonesia-Malaysia, "Language Council of Indonesia-Malaysia") on 29 December 1972. MBIM became MABBIM when Brunei joined this council on 4 November 1985. Singapore is as an observer.

== Nations represented ==
Members
Country	Standard language	National regulatory board
Indonesia	Indonesian (Bahasa Indonesia)	Agency for Language Development and Cultivation (Badan Pengembangan dan Pembinaan Bahasa)
Malaysia	Malaysian (Bahasa Malaysia)	Institute of Language and Literature (Dewan Bahasa dan Pustaka)
Brunei	Bruneian Malay (Bahasa Melayu Brunei)	Language and Literature Bureau (Dewan Bahasa dan Pustaka Brunei)

Observers
Country	Standard language	National regulatory board
Singapore	Singaporean Malay (Bahasa Melayu Singapura)	Malay Language Council (Majilis Bahasa Melayu Singapura)

== Literature ==
A yearly journal called Buletin MABBIM ("the BIM Language Council Bulletin") is published by Indonesia's Language Development and Fostering Agency on behalf of the organization.
