= A Century of Dishonor =

1881 non-fiction book by Helen Hunt Jackson

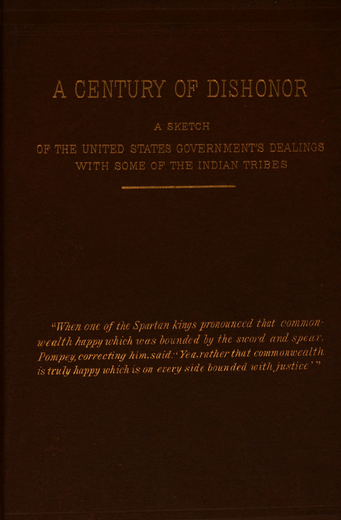
- 1881 cover
- Author: Helen Hunt Jackson
- Language: English
- Subject: Injustices to the Native Americans in the United States.
- Genre: Non-fiction
- Published: 1881 (publication year)
- Publication place: United States
- Media type: Print (paperback)
- ISBN: 978-1-4209-4438-9

A Century of Dishonor: A Sketch of the United States Government's Dealings with Some of the Indian Tribes is a non-fiction book by Helen Hunt Jackson first published in 1881 that chronicled the experiences of Native Americans in the United States, focusing on injustices.

Jackson wrote A Century of Dishonor in an attempt to change government ideas and policy toward Native Americans at a time when the effects of the 1871 Indian Appropriations Act (making the entire Native American population wards of the nation) had begun to draw the attention of the public. Jackson attended a meeting in Boston in 1879 at which Standing Bear, a Ponca, told how the federal government forcibly removed his tribe from their ancestral homeland in the wake of the creation of the Great Sioux Reservation. After meeting Standing Bear, she conducted research at the Astor Library in New York and was shocked by the story of government mistreatment that she found. She wrote in a letter, "I shall be found with 'Indians' engraved on my brain when I am dead.—A fire has been kindled within me which will never go out."

Jackson sent a copy of her book to every member of Congress, at her own expense. She hoped to awaken the conscience of the American people, and their representatives, to the flagrant wrongs that had been done to the American Indians, and persuade them "to redeem the name of the United States from the stain of a century of dishonor".

The book consists primarily of the tribal histories of seven different tribes. Among the incidents it depicts is the eradication of Praying Town Indians in the colonial period, despite their recent conversion to Christianity, because it was assumed that all Indians were the same. Her book brought to light the injustices enacted upon the Native Americans as it chronicled the ruthlessness of white settlers in their greed for land, wealth, and power.

Upon its publication, A Century of Dishonor received some adverse criticism and was dismissed as "sentimental". But it had some effect in shaking the moral senses of America, and in 1881 Congress acted to remedy, in part, the situation of the Ponca people. However, it did not have quite the impact that Jackson wanted, which spurred her to write an emotional appeal to action in Ramona.

Long out of print, A Century of Dishonor was first reprinted in 1964 by Ross & Haines of Minneapolis, Minnesota, via a limited printing of 2,000 copies, and has been reprinted numerous times since then.

== Synopsis ==
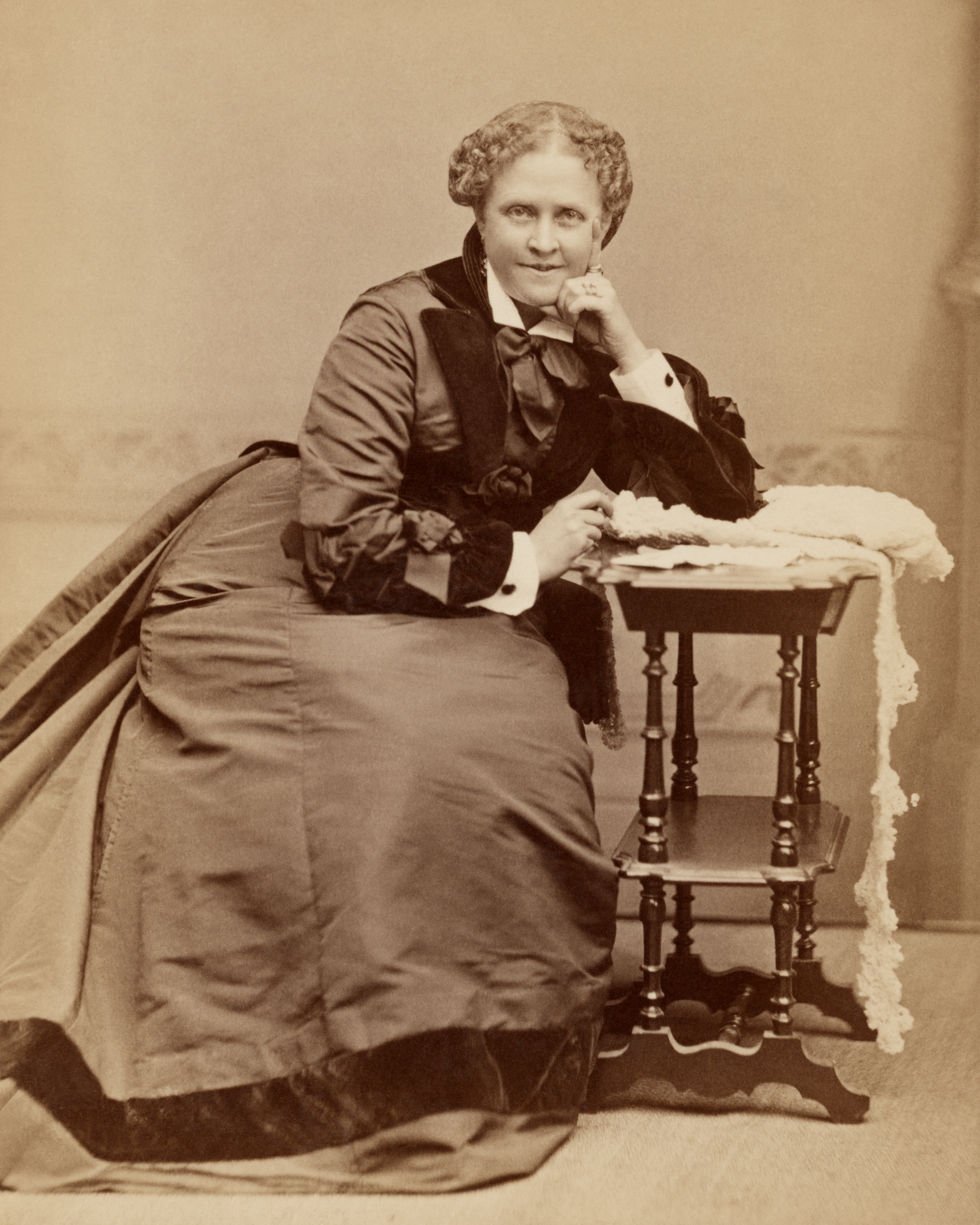
Helen Hunt Jackson, the author

Originally published in 1881, Helen Hunt Jackson chronicles the treatment of American Indians by the United States beginning in colonial times through to her present. The book can be broken down into four major themes:

- the mistreatment of seven major Native American tribes
- promises and treaties issued and broken by the United States government to these tribes
- forced removal of these (and other) tribes to reservations located on land that was unsuitable for farming or sustaining the Native American way of life
- massacres of the Native American people by white Americans.

Jackson begins by providing in her "Introductory" a summary of the policies and positions of the United States relative to the Native American population; however, because of the time in which she was writing, she refers to them as Indians. Jackson calls attention to the changes that occurred when the United States took territory from the colonial powers. Most prominently, the United States did not acknowledge or respect Native claims to the land, as recognized by treaties, to the same degree that Spain, Britain, and France had. This was in part, she explains, because the treaties written in English purposefully had different expectations than those written for and signed by the Native populations. She contextualizes her distress by examining the attitudes of the legislature, the executive, and the judiciary from the end of the 18th century through much of the 19th century. She concludes by stating that through their unjust treatment of Native Americans, the United States violated international law and made itself susceptible to a reputation for cruelty.

=== The Peoples ===
The seven chapters that follow the introduction each describe the general history of the Delaware, the Cheyenne, the Nez Percé, the Sioux, the Ponca, the Winnebagoes, and the Cherokee, as well as the way their cultures shaped the way the United States took advantage of them. Jackson uses evidence from Official Reports of the War Department or the Department of Interior to show that the United States did not hide the atrocities they committed, nor did they see them as such. In addition to using evidence that the United States provided of their mistreatment of Native Americans, Jackson also took great care to ensure that she included information on how each of the people viewed themselves and how they felt about the way they were treated. For example, at the beginning of her chapter on the Sioux, she provides a history of their name (it comes from the old French word Nadouessioux meaning enemies) but also includes that they refer to themselves as "Dakota".

=== Massacres ===
Having shared the legal and cultural trouble that the aforementioned tribes experienced at the hands of the United States, Jackson goes on to provide detailed descriptions of three massacres: The Conestoga Massacre, the Gnadenhütten Massacre, and the Massacres of Apaches, as a demonstration of the violence committed against Native Americans. In addition to explaining the atrocities and violence, Jackson also provides a history of the interactions between the Native Americans and the white population prior to the massacres.

=== Conclusion ===
Jackson concludes that "[i]t makes little difference, however, where one opens the record of the history of the Indians; every page and every year has its dark stain." She calls on all branches of government, no matter how difficult the process or how long over due, to right their wrongs. Jackson outlines four changes, the cessation of cheating, robbing, and breaking promises, along with the end of refusing to protect Native American property rights under American law, that she believes are at least a good start to make up for all of the harm that the United States government caused.

== Background ==
Jackson wrote A Century of Dishonor in an attempt to change government ideas/policy toward Native Americans at a time when effects of the 1871 Indian Appropriations Act (making the entire Native American population wards of the nation) had begun to draw the attention of the public. Jackson attended a meeting in Boston in 1879 at which Standing Bear, a Ponca, told how the federal government forcibly removed his tribe from its ancestral homeland in the wake of the creation of the Great Sioux Reservation. After meeting Standing Bear, she conducted research at the Astor Library in New York and was shocked by the story of government mistreatment that she found. She wrote in a letter, "I shall be found with 'Indians' engraved on my brain when I am dead.—A fire has been kindled within me which will never go out."

She collected information from a number of sources that shaped her well-rounded approach to understanding the experience of Native Americans and their relationship with the United States. At the start of the book, she provides an appendix of the reports and accounts that she relied on including records of prices that white men paid for scalps (of Native Americans) and personal testimonials of grievances that Sioux had experienced.

== Distribution ==
The book was originally published in 1881 and Jackson personally sent a copy of her book to every member of Congress, at her own expense. She hoped to awaken the conscience of the American people, and their representatives, to the flagrant wrongs that had been done to the American Indians, and persuade them "to redeem the name of the United States from the stain of a century of dishonor".

After a long hiatus, the book was first reprinted in 1964 by Ross & Haines of Minneapolis, Minnesota via a limited printing of 2,000 copies. However, this was soon followed by a larger printing from Harper & Row in their Torchbook series in 1965, with an introductory essay by Andrew F. Rolle but without the fifteen documents that served as an appendix of supporting evidence in the original work and its first reprinting. Inspired by the women's movement of the 1970s, it was not until the 1980s that more extensive attention to Jackson and others like her began to appear in academic journals.

== Reception ==
=== Critical response ===
Initially, some critics, including President Theodore Roosevelt, dismissed her as being a "sentimental historian", which he did in the first appendix to The Winning of the West. However, more than a century later, historian John Milton Cooper Jr. countered Roosevelt's dismissal of Jackson's argument by stating that Roosevelt's view of Native American history was "Eurocentric, racist, male-dominated, and environmentally obtuse from a late-twentieth-century point of view."

Over time, her work has been recognized for its important impact on the nation's understanding of the mistreatment of Native Americans by the United States and prompted discussion on the role of women's voices in history both publicly and academically. However, critics continue to reference the text as a predecessor to Ramona rather than as a text that stands alone.

=== Public response ===
Although there was a good deal of adverse criticism even at the time of its publication, A Century of Dishonor, along with Jackson's many magazine articles, letters to editors, and personal contacts, had an effect, and in March 1887 Congress passed a bill partially rectifying the particular situation of the Ponca people whose cause had first attracted her attention. The Dawes Act was born out of Jackson's efforts and called for the return of Native lands to Native Americans in an act of humanitarian reform, though it did not come close to fully or successfully addressing all of the grievances that Jackson had expressed.

The New York Evangelist, a periodical that existed for most of the 19th century, wrote a review just after the book was published in which they reiterated Jackson's purpose for writing: to draw attention to the disregard of the rights of Native Americans by the United States government and called on the country to adopt a Christian policy toward Native Americans that was both "just and humane". In addition, for decades after it was published, the reporting that Jackson did in A Century of Dishonor was used to justify arguments against government treatment of Native Americans, especially by the Indian Bureau.

== Connections to Ramona ==
Many of the articles that mention A Century of Dishonor from the late 19th and early 20th centuries are reviews of Ramona in which A Century of Dishonor is mentioned as its predecessor and that Jackson's journey to write A Century of Dishonor led her from the east coast to California where she found inspiration for the novel. Christine Holbo argues that, 'The divide separating A Century of Dishonor's legalistic human rights activism from the kaleidoscopic and even campy aesthetics of Ramona deserves more attention. Undoubtedly, the two projects shared a common concern for the plight of Native Americans in post-Reconstruction America. But their differences suggest, at the very least, a disconnect between means and ends. To the degree to which Ramona can be read as an appeal on behalf of Native American rights, a continuation of the project laid out in A Century of Dishonor, the novel must be read against its romantic interpretation of mission- and Mexican-era California.'

Valerie Sherer Mathes, in her book Helen Hunt Jackson and Her Indian Reform Legacy, devotes a single chapter to A Century of Dishonor in which she suggests that while the initial response was lacking in enthusiasm, Jackson's "work had definitely acquainted the public with the deplorable condition of the American Indian", but that its greater importance was laying "the groundwork for Jackson's next Indian crusade", Ramona.
