= The Great Sioux Nation (book) =

1977 book edited by Roxanne Dunbar-Ortiz

The Great Sioux Nation: Sitting in Judgment on America
- First edition
- Author: Roxanne Dunbar-Ortiz (ed)
- Language: English
- Genre: Non-fiction
- Published: 1977 (Random House/American Indian Treaty Council Information Center); 1980 (Moon Books/AITCIC); 2013 (University of Nebraska Press)
- Media type: Print (Hhardback, paperback)
- Pages: 224
- ISBN: 978-0-8032-4483-2 (2013)

The Great Sioux Nation: Sitting in Judgment on America is a book edited by Roxanne Dunbar-Ortiz, "An Oral History of the Sioux Nation and Its Struggle for Sovereignty", that documents the 1974 "Lincoln Treaty Hearing". Testimony produced during that hearing has been cited by the International Indian Treaty Council in advocating for Indigenous sovereignty and treaty rights, efforts which eventually saw the 2007 Declaration on the Rights of Indigenous Peoples.

The 'Lincoln Treaty Hearing' took place in December 1974, in a US District Court in Lincoln, Nebraska, as part of the long series of court proceedings which followed the 1973 Wounded Knee Siege. The court heard approximately 65 people during thirteen days and produced almost 3,000 pages of testimony. Among the activists and scholars who participated were Simon J. Ortiz, Vine Deloria, Jr., Alvin M. Josephy, Jr., Leonard Crow Dog, Russell Means, William S. Laughlin, Raymond J. DeMallie, Beatrice Medicine, Gladys Bissonette, Dennis Banks, and Roxanne Dunbar Ortiz. Judge Warren Keith Urbom presided.

The book was first published in 1977. A new edition in 2013 by the University of Nebraska Press contains a new foreword by Philip J. Deloria and a new introduction by Roxanne Dunbar Ortiz. This paperback edition has 232 pages and ISBN 978-0-8032-4483-2.

== Selected excerpts ==
We are still waiting on that promise when we stood down our arms on our own country, under our own Treaty. We have subjected men and women and old people to these courts because we believe that somewhere, sometime, some place, this country is going to have some integrity and honesty in its dealings with Indian people. I will probably die chasing after that integrity and honesty. So be it.

— Russell Means

Last summer some people, tourists, were at Wounded Knee while I was there visiting my son's grave. They asked me where Wounded Knee was. "Right here," I said, "This is the church that burned down. The goons burned it down because there's a lot of evidence in that church. It's full of holes. It's just like a honeycomb in there. The people were in there so they shot at them. So this is it," I said. "And down the hill you can see that house over there. It's burnt down, and that church over there, that's where the people stayed. And this, all of this hill around here was where they surrendered, a handful of people." ...

I thought it over, about the first massacre in 1890. My mother was twelve years old and she was right in there. She used to tell us what happened. She said they surrendered to the Government like that, and they took all their weapons, whatever they had. When they got through then they started shooting them, little babies on up, women, men. ...

I never had given it a thought that someday this would happen here again and my son was going to be next, lying in the Wounded Knee Cemetery. Before this happened he liked to joke. They were sitting around and he said, "If anything happens to me," he said, "bury me here in Wounded Knee." And he laughed. Later on he said, "Things are getting tough, I see, so if I get killed, I don't want to bother my people so just bury me in the bunker. That's where I want to be, fighting for my people. I don't want to go out of here, out of Wounded Knee. I want to be buried right here."

So that's where we buried him. My mother's uncle and aunt are buried there from the 1890 massacre.

I told the tourists, I said, that I never thought that my son would be next, that he would be lying here. ...

— Agnes Lamonte

== Selected book bibliography ==
- Anderson et al., Voices from Wounded Knee 1973 (Akwesasne Notes, 1974). ISBN 978-0-914-83801-2.
- Dennis Banks, Ojibwa Warrior (University of Oklahoma Press, 2005)
- Dee Brown, Bury My Heart at Wounded Knee (Holt, Rinehart, and Winston, 1970). ISBN 978-1-402-79337-0
- Daniel M. Cobb, Native American Activism in Cold War America: The Struggle for Sovereignty (University Press of Kansas, 2008)
- Elizabeth Cook-Lynn, A Separate Country: Postcoloniality and American Indian Nations (Texas Tech University Press, 2012).
- Vine Deloria, Jr., Behind the Trail of Broken Treaties: An Indian Declaration of Independence (University of Texas Press, 1974,'10)
- Charles Eastman, Indian Heroes and Great Chieftains (Little, Brown and Company, 1918) text
- Mario Gonzalez and Elizabeth Cook-Lynn, The Politics of Hallowed Ground: Wounded Knee and the Struggle for Indian Sovereignty (University of Illinois Press, 1999)
- Alvin M. Josephy, Jr., The Patriot Chiefs (Penguin Books, 1961,'93)
- Peter Matthiessen, In the Spirit of Crazy Horse (Viking Penguin, 1983,'92)
- Russell Means, Where White Men Fear to Tread (St. Martin's Press, 1995)
- Mari Sandoz, Crazy Horse (Alfred A. Knopf, 1942)
- Paul Chaat Smith & Robert Allen Warrior, Like a Hurricane: The Indian Movement from Alcatraz to Wounded Knee (The New Press, 1997)
- Luther Standing Bear, My People the Sioux (Houghton Mifflin Company, 1928)
- Warren Urbom, Called to Justice: The Life of a Federal Trial Judge (University of Nebraska Press, 2012).
