= An Indigenous Peoples' History of the United States =

2014 book by Roxanne Dunbar-Ortiz

- Author: Roxanne Dunbar-Ortiz
- Cover artist: Gabi Anderson
- Language: English
- Genre: History
- Publisher: Beacon Press, Boston, MA
- Publication date: 2014
- Publication place: United States
- Media type: Print (hardback & paperback)
- Pages: 296
- OCLC: 868199534

An Indigenous Peoples' History of the United States is a non-fiction book written by the historian Roxanne Dunbar-Ortiz and published by Beacon Press. It is the third of a series of six ReVisioning books which reconstruct and reinterpret U.S. history from marginalized peoples' perspectives. On July 23, 2019, the same press published An Indigenous Peoples' History of the United States for Young People, an adaptation by Jean Mendoza and Debbie Reese of Dunbar-Ortiz's original volume.

== Synopsis ==
An Indigenous Peoples’ History of the United States describes and analyzes a four-hundred-year span of complex Indigenous struggles against the colonization of the Americas. The book highlights resultant conflicts, wars, and Indigenous strategies and sites of resistance.

The book's contents across many chronological chapters challenge what Dunbar-Ortiz articulates as the founding mythology of the burgeoning country, bolstered in the 19th century by the concept of Manifest Destiny and the Doctrine of Discovery. Dunbar-Ortiz seeks to show "how policy against the Indigenous peoples was colonialist and designed to seize the territories of the original inhabitants, displacing or eliminating them". The book details how this mythology rose out of the imperatives of settler colonialism. It graphically depicts the seizure of the original inhabitants' territories and subsequent displacement and elimination of them through genocidal practices such as the movement to Kill the Indian, Save the Man.

An Indigenous Peoples' History of the United States details how such policies, practices, and values were manifest through the ranks of the U.S. military to the highest offices of government. It also describes the predominance of anti-Indigenous practices and values celebrated in popular culture in the 19th and 20th centuries through writers like James Fenimore Cooper, especially in his novel Last of the Mohicans and its cinematic renditions; Henry David Thoreau; Walt Whitman; and in D.W. Griffith's enormously popular Birth of a Nation.

The book is dedicated to Jack D. Forbes, Vine Deloria Jr. and Howard Adams.

== Chapter summaries ==
=== Introduction: This Land ===
In the introduction, Dunbar-Ortiz lays her task on the table: "How might acknowledging the reality of US history work to transform society? That is the central question this book pursues."

"This book attempts to tell the story of the United States as a colonial settler-state, one that, like colonialist European states, crushed and subjugated the original civilizations in the territories it now rules. Indigenous peoples, now in a colonial relationship with the United States, inhabited and thrived for millennia before they were displaced to fragmented reservations and economically decimated."

Dunbar-Ortiz asserts that the reality of the history of US policies and actions toward Native peoples is a reality of settler-colonial imperialism, and that this reality is inherent in the national origin myth of the United States: Puritan settlers had a covenant with God to take the land, and the basis of the Columbus myth is in the discovery doctrine. She describes how the system of settler colonialism depends on force, violence, and genocide, and concludes that US history cannot be understood without addressing that fact.

In the introduction Dunbar-Ortiz also discusses the changing approaches taken by historical scholars in dealing with these facts, and concludes they have failed to understand that history because they have failed to apply a colonial framework in their approaches.

=== One: Follow the Corn ===
Dunbar-Ortiz supports her assertion that "North America in 1492 was not a virgin wilderness but a network of Indigenous nations ..." with her description of the agricultural and technological accomplishments, governance structures, trade networks, and practices of land stewardship of the Indigenous nations' civilizations for centuries before the arrival of Europeans.

=== Two: Culture of Conquest ===
Dunbar-Ortiz traces the development of the European culture of conquest and colonization during the centuries before the arrival of Europeans in the Americas. Key to her analysis are the Crusades; the papacy directing mercenaries to crush domestic pagans, women, witches, and heretics; the emergence of the concept of land as private property by enclosure of the commons and privatization of land; the use of displaced populations to settle the Thirteen Colonies with the promise of land; the emergence of white supremacist ideology from the Crusades and the Plantations of Ireland, and the use of that ideology to neutralize class conflict between the landed and landless by giving confiscated lands in the colonies to the landless. Other factors identified as contributing to the culture of conquest are the Protestant belief of being a chosen people founding a "New Jerusalem", and the transition from religious wars to genocidal wars. In this chapter she also challenges history scholars' consensus terminal narrative.

=== Three: Cult of the Covenant ===
Dunbar-Ortiz discusses

- the myth that North America was a primitive wilderness when Europeans arrived
- the role of covenant and exceptionalism ideologies in the British colonization of the Americas
- parallels between the Plantations of Ireland and the European colonization of the Americas
- the role of Scots-Irish colonists and their Calvinist covenant doctrines in the push of settler colonialism into the Ohio River valley region
- the transformation of sacred Indigenous land into commodified real estate

=== Four: Bloody Footprints ===
Dunbar-Ortiz describes how war was waged against Native peoples in North America by settler militias during the colonial era, beginning with the wars waged by the Colony of Virginia against the Powhatan during the 17th centuries. She includes descriptions of extreme violence inflicted on civilian communities, the use of mercenary military leaders who had fought in the European wars of religion, and the practice of bounties for scalps which had precedent during the Plantations of Ireland.

=== Five: Birth of a Nation ===
Dunbar-Ortiz begins by ascribing the origin of the Second Amendment's right to keep and bear arms to the role of settler-militia raids on Indigenous communities and to slave patrols. She then describes events and leading figures in the confrontations between settler militias and Indigenous inhabitants of the Ohio Valley and the Old Southwest. At the close of the chapter she states that war methods practiced during this period continued to be used in wars against Native peoples west of the Mississippi, against civilians during the American Civil War, and in later U.S. military interventions in the Philippines, Cuba, Central America, Korea, Vietnam, Iraq, and Afghanistan.

=== Six: The Last of the Mohicans and Andrew Jackson's White Republic ===
Dunbar-Ortiz chronicles the role of Andrew Jackson in waging wars of annihilation against Native peoples east of the Mississippi, from 1801 when he commanded the Tennessee militia, through his years as US President. The other major topic in this chapter is what Dunbar-Ortiz describes as the "reinvention of the birth of the United States" in the novels of James Fenimore Cooper and other writers of that era. She also critiques how some historians have interpreted Jackson, bolstering her argument with a quote from Jackson biographer Michael Paul Rogin: "Historians ... have failed to place Indians at the center of Jackson's life. They have interpreted the Age of Jackson from every perspective but Indian destruction, the one from which it actually developed historically."

=== Seven: Sea to Shining Sea ===
In describing the events leading up to and during the Mexican–American War, Dunbar-Ortiz covers:

- Spanish treatment of Indigenous peoples before Mexican independence
- early US intrusions into the territory ceded after the war, including:
- the expedition of Zebulon Pike that crossed into Spanish territory, 1806-1807
- US traders arrival in Taos in the 1820s
- arrival of US settlers in Texas in the 1820s
- US presence in California in the early 1840s

In this chapter Dunbar-Ortiz also points out that the status of statehood in the territories of the Louisiana Purchase and the lands ceded by Mexico could be achieved only when settlers outnumber the Indigenous population, which required "decimation or forced removal of Indigenous populations;" and she contrasts the role of Indigenous peoples in the American Revolutionary War, where they were targeted by the Continental Army as enemies, with their role in the Spanish American wars of independence, where they were often participants in the fights for independence from Spain.

=== Eight: “Indian Country” ===
Dunbar-Ortiz surveys the genocidal wars west of the Mississippi River during and after the American Civil War, and federal policies negatively impacting Native peoples during that time period, including:

- Acts of Congress taking away Indigenous lands, including the 1862 Homestead Act and Acts transferring land to the states and to private railroad companies
- legislation halting formal treaty making
- destruction of the American buffalo
- the role of mercantile and industrial capitalists
- the Wounded Knee Massacre of 1890
- the policy of assimilation and allotment of collectively held lands

She also discusses the history of resistance: the Cheyenne in 1878, the Nez Perce in 1877, and the Apache in 1850-86; as well as resistance to allotments by the Cherokee, Muskogee Creeks, Hopi, Pueblo Indians.

=== Nine: US Triumphalism and Peacetime Colonialism ===
Dunbar-Ortiz describes the parallels between U.S. military methods used against Native peoples with those used overseas from 1798 to 1919, drawing on examples from campaigns in countries around the world, and asserting that these engagements were "all about securing markets and natural resources, developing imperialist power to protect and extend corporate wealth." She also describes federal policy towards Native peoples during the administrations of Franklin D. Roosevelt, Harry S. Truman, and Dwight D. Eisenhower, and closes the chapter with discussion of the impact on Native resistance movements of the rise of civil rights movements and the global decolonization movements, and the response of the CIA to national liberation movements.

=== Ten: Ghost Dance Prophecy: A Nation is Coming ===
This chapter opens with comments on the policies of the Kennedy and Nixon administrations regarding Native peoples, followed by discussion of resistance actions including:

- struggles for the return of Paha Sapa (Black Hills)
- the occupation of Alcatraz
- the founding of D-Q University
- the founding of the American Indian Movement and other organizations
- the Wounded Knee incident

Dunbar-Ortiz closes the chapter with a recap of history of the Sioux from 1805 to 1973, and drawing parallels between Wounded Knee massacre in 1890 and the Mỹ Lai massacre in 1968.

=== Eleven: The Doctrine of Discovery ===
Dunbar-Ortiz describes the origins and application of the Doctrine of Discovery, from a papal bull issued in 1455, to the 1494 Treaty of Tordesillas dividing the world between Spain and Portugal; the later adoption of the doctrine by other European monarchies and then the French Republic; and its adoption in United States law by the claim by Thomas Jefferson, then United States Secretary of State, in 1792, that the doctrine was international law applicable to the United States, and recognition of the doctrine in the 1823 Supreme Court of the United States decision in Johnson v. McIntosh.

Taking the long view of history, Dunber-Ortiz next traces the sequence starting with the formation of European nation states by self-determination, through imperialism to secure resources and labor, to industrialization, to decolonization, and back to self-determination, this time in the decolonized territories, while noting the distinction between the Indigenous concept of nation and sovereignty as distinguished from the western European model.

This chapter also discusses activities at the United Nations, such as creation of the International Indian Treaty Council, the 1977 Conference on Indians in the Americas, and the Declaration on the Rights of Indigenous Peoples. It then describes how the United Nations Study on Treaties, completed in 1999, has been used to bolster Indigenous claims for restoration, restitution, and repatriation of lands, such as in Cobell v. Salazar and the Black Hills lawsuit. The Rhetoric of 21st century figures such as president Barrack Obama to frame America as a country of immigrants instead of colonizers is analyzed as an example of modern denial of Indigenous genocide.

=== Conclusion: The Future of the United States ===
The concluding chapter draws on Imperial Grunts by Robert Kaplan in its discussion of the parallels between "Indian wars" and more recent US foreign actions. It closes by posing the questions: "How then can US society come to terms with its past? How can it acknowledge responsibility?" Dunbar-Ortiz answers the questions:

That process rightfully starts by honoring the treaties the United States made with Indigenous nations, by restoring all sacred sites, starting with the Black Hills and including most federally held parks and land and all stolen sacred items and body parts, and by payment of sufficient reparations for the reconstruction and expansion of Native nations. ... For the future to be realized, it will require extensive educational programs and the full support and active participation of the descendants of settlers, enslaved Africans, and colonized Mexicans, as well as immigrant populations.

== Reception ==
=== Reviews ===
Among the various reviews, early 21st century issues and tensions in the U.S. have been highlighted. Indigenous press and other press regularly inclusive of Indigenous news have put forth reviews, such as the Tribal College Journal, and The Santa Fe New Mexican.

A reviewer in CounterPunch wrote that this book "will be of great value to those first learning about the Indigenous perspective as well as someone like me who has been reading and writing about native peoples for the past twenty-five years."

Publishers Weekly found the book comprehensive, noting that "Dunbar-Ortiz brings together every indictment of white Americans that has been cast upon them over time, and she does so by raising intelligent new questions about many of the current trends of academia, such as multiculturalism."

The San Francisco Chronicle wrote that the book was of comparable importance to Dee Brown's Bury My Heart at Wounded Knee and found that it "synthesizes a vast body of scholarship, much of it by Indians themselves, and provides an antidote to the work of historians who have rationalized the settling of the West and the “civilizing” of the Indians."

From a review in Summit Daily: "‘Imperialism,’ ‘settler colonialism,’ ‘genocide’ and ‘land theft’ are all words that matter when writing and studying this history. Throughout her book, she repeatedly emphasizes the importance of being truthful and accurate when confronted with the often-ugly realities of this nation's past."

Kirkus Reviews gave a negative review, with its reviewer writing that "the author says little that hasn’t been said before, but she packs a trove of ideological assumptions into nearly every page.". The review criticised as inaccurate the claims that the military phrase "in country" derives from the military phrase "Indian country" and the claim that all Spanish people in the New World were "gold-obsessed." The review added that "Ancestral Puebloan sites show evidence of cannibalism and torture, which in turn points to the inconvenient fact that North America was not an Eden before the arrival of the Europeans.". Dunbar-Ortiz is repeatedly compared to Ward Churchill in the review.

=== Awards ===
Recognition of the book's value has also come in the form of praise and awards such as that from Robin D. G. Kelley, author of Freedom Dreams, suggesting this is the most important book on the subject of U.S. history. In 2015, it received the American Book Award and the PEN Oakland-Josephine Miles Award for Excellence in Literature.

=== Reading lists and excerpts ===
The Human Rights Campaign recommended reading and discussing the book as one means of dealing responsibly with Thanksgiving. The book was also included in recommended reading lists by Business Insider, Patch, BookRiot, and Oxfam America.

Salon posted an excerpt about it on Columbus Day.
