= Native American name controversy =

Aspect of European colonization of the Americas

There is an ongoing discussion about the terminology used by the Indigenous peoples of the Americas to describe themselves, as well as how they prefer to be referred to by others. Preferred terms vary primarily by region and age. As Indigenous peoples and communities are diverse, there is no consensus on naming.

Since the European colonization of the Americas, the blanket term Indian referring to all Indigenous peoples has remained widespread in both formal and informal discourse. This term was first applied by the Italian navigator Christopher Columbus, reflecting his purported belief that he had reached the East Indies when he landed in the Antilles on his 1492 voyage. As a general exception, Eskimo was instead applied to all of the Indigenous peoples of the Arctic, though this term has declined in usage.

When discussing broad groups of peoples, naming may be based on shared language, region, or historical relationship, such as Anishinaabeg, Tupi–Guarani-speaking peoples, Pueblo-dwelling peoples, Amazonian tribes, or LDN peoples (Lakota, Dakota, and Nakota peoples).

Although Indian is the most common collective name, many English exonyms have been used to refer to the Indigenous peoples of the Americas (also known as the New World), who were resident within their own territories when European colonists arrived in the 15th and 16th centuries. Some of these names were based on terminology in French, Spanish, or other European languages spoken by earlier explorers and colonists, many of which were derived from the names that tribes called each other. Some resulted from the colonists' attempt to translate endonyms from the native language into their own, or to transliterate by sound. In addition, some names or terms were pejorative, arising from prejudice and fear, during periods of conflict (such as the American Indian Wars) between the cultures involved.

In the 20th and 21st centuries, there has been greater awareness among non-Indigenous peoples that Indigenous peoples in the Americas have been active in discussions of how they wish to be known. Indigenous people have pressed for the elimination of terms they consider to be obsolete, inaccurate, or racist. During the latter half of the 20th century and the rise of the Red Power movement, the United States government responded by proposing the use of the term Native American to recognize the primacy of Indigenous peoples' tenure in the country. The term has become widespread nationally, but only partially accepted by various Indigenous groups. Other naming conventions have been proposed and used, but none is accepted by all Indigenous groups. Typically, each name has a particular audience and political or cultural connotation, and regional usage varies.

In Canada, the term First Nations is generally used for peoples covered by the Indian Act, and Indigenous peoples used for Native peoples more generally, including Inuit and Métis, who do not fall under the "First Nations" category. Status Indian remains a legal designation because of the Indian Act.

== United States ==
=== Indian and American Indian (since 1492) ===
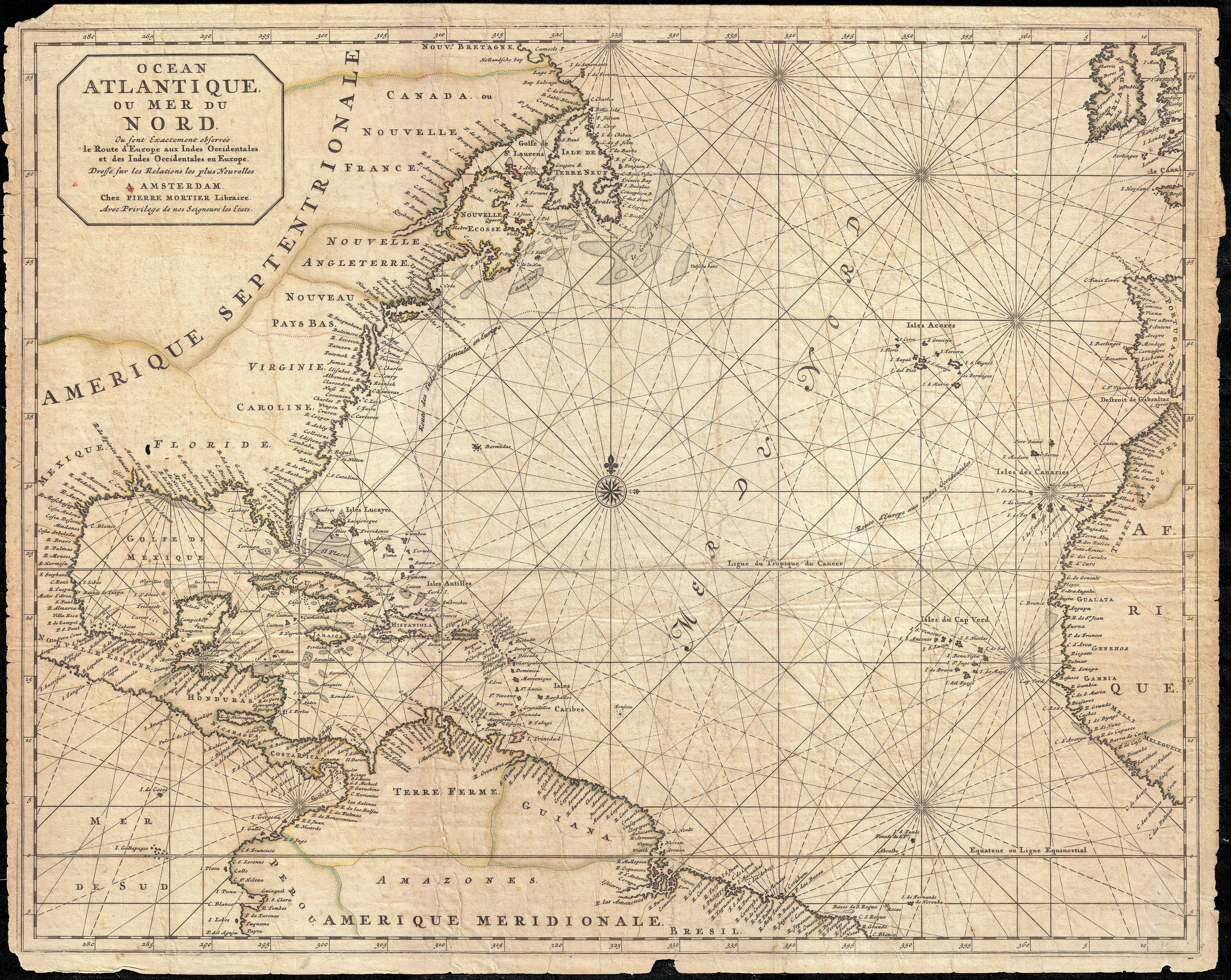
1693 nautical chart of the Atlantic Ocean marked with Route d'Europe aux Indes Occidentales ('Route from Europe to the West Indies')

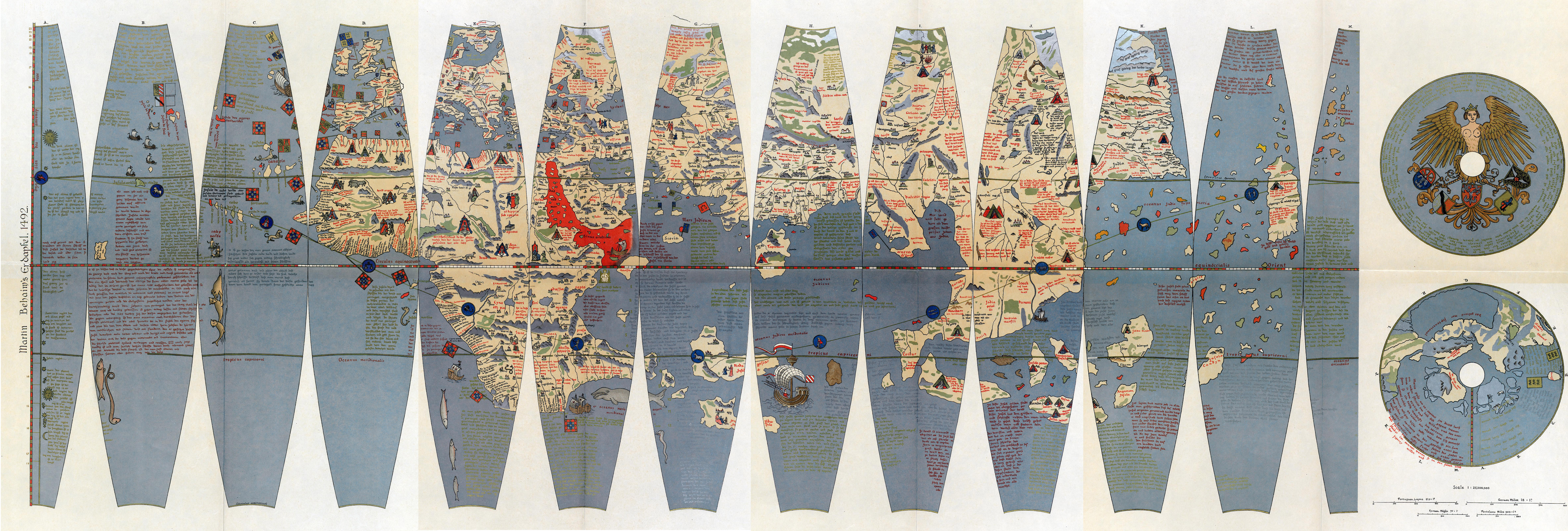
1492 Behaim globe (Erdapfel), with the label India located in what appears to be southern China, but also near the label Ciamba, i.e. the Indianized kingdom Champa in what is now southern Vietnam. Columbus thought he had arrived in Champa (compare Dragon's Tail (peninsula) § Age of Discovery and Cattigara § Columbus's search for Ciamba), part of the East Indies, his original goal.

Europeans at the time of Christopher Columbus's voyage often referred to all of South and East Asia as India or the Indias/Indies, sometimes dividing the area into Greater India, Middle India, and Lesser India. The oldest surviving terrestrial globe, by Martin Behaim in 1492 (before Columbus' voyage), labels the entire south of the Asian continent between Indus River and Pacific Ocean with India, named ultimately after the river.

Columbus carried a passport in Latin from the Spanish monarchs that dispatched him ad partes Indie ('toward the regions of India') on their behalf. When he landed in the Antilles, Columbus referred to the resident peoples he encountered there as "Indians", reflecting his purported belief that he had reached the Indian Ocean. The name was adopted by other Spanish and ultimately other Europeans; for centuries the Indigenous peoples of the Americas were collectively called Indians in various European languages. This misnomer was perpetuated in place naming; the islands of the Caribbean were named, and are still known as, the West Indies.

As European colonists began to settle in the Americas in the 16th and 17th centuries, and had more sustained contact with the resident peoples, they understood that the residents were not a homogeneous group sharing a unified culture and government, but discrete societies with their own distinct languages and social systems. Early historical accounts show that some colonists, including Jesuit missionaries in New France, attempted to learn and record the autonyms of these individual groups, but the use of the general term Indian persisted.

In 1968, the American Indian Movement (AIM) was founded in the United States. In 1977, a delegation from the International Indian Treaty Council, an arm of AIM, elected to collectively identify as American Indian, at the United Nations Conference on Indians in the Americas in Geneva, Switzerland. Some Indigenous activists and public figures, such as Russell Means (Oglala Lakota), have preferred American Indian to the more recently adopted Native American. According to the National Museum of the American Indian: "In the United States, Native American has been widely used but is falling out of favor with some groups, and the terms American Indian or Indigenous American are preferred by many Native people."

The term American Indian is the accepted term used by the United States Government, by the National Museum of the American Indian, the Colonial Williamsburg Foundation, and other institutions. According to the Encyclopedia Britannica: "In the United States, many individuals of indigenous heritage continue to refer to aboriginal Americans, in aggregate, as Indians."

==== As a term for other groups ====
Scholar Renate Bartl states Indian, in some cases, became an alternate label for Black and colored people, and the term did not automatically imply Native American ancestry. She stated a reason to self-identify as Indian was to evade classification as Black or colored, which would cause one to possibly be enslaved or suffer from the Black Codes. Journalist Frances Foreman writes this identification occurred among light-skinned, landowning free African Americans in the American Southeast.

==== Alternative etymology ====
In the late 20th century, some etymologists suggested that the origin of the term was not from a confusion with India, but from the Spanish expression En Dios, meaning 'in God', or a similar one in Italian. David Wilton notes in Word Myths: Debunking Linguistic Urban Legends that this phrase does not appear in any of Columbus's writing. Wilton says that many European languages since Greek and Roman times used variations of the term Indian to describe the peoples of the Indian subcontinent, more than a millennium before the voyages of Columbus.

In the 17th century, Quechua nobleman Felipe Guaman Poma de Ayala claimed that the word Indian derived from en dia, meaning 'in day', referring to the Inca Empire's altitude and proximity to the sun.

==== Objections (since the 1970s) ====
Objections to the usage of Indian and American Indian include the fact that Indian arose from a historical error, and does not accurately reflect the origin of the people to whom it refers. In addition, some feel that the term has so absorbed negative and demeaning connotations through its historical usage as to render it objectionable in context. Additionally, American Indian is often understood to mean only the peoples of the mainland body of the United States, which excludes other peoples considered Indigenous peoples of the Americas; including Inuit (including Inupiat), Yupik peoples (Yuit/Alutiiq/Cup'ik), and Aleut (i.e., the groups whose traditional languages are Eskimo–Aleut languages). Related groups among these tribal peoples are referred to collectively as either Alaskan Natives (based on geography), First Nations (in Canada), or Siberians.

Supporters of the terms Indian and American Indian argue that they have been in use for such a long time that many people have become accustomed to them and no longer consider them exonyms. Both terms are still widely used today. American Indian appears often in treaties between the United States and the Indigenous peoples with whom they have been negotiating since the colonial period, and many federal, state, and local laws also use it. American Indian and Alaska Native are the terms used in the United States Census.

=== Native American (since the 1960s) ===
The Oxford English Dictionary cites usage of the uncapitalized term native American in several publications dating to 1737, but it is unclear whether these texts refer to Indigenous peoples, or to persons born on American soil. One early use is the 1817 novel Keep Cool by John Neal, which declares "the Indian is the only native American; he holds his charter from God himself". During the 1850s, a group of Anglo-Saxon Protestant Americans used the capitalized term Native Americans to differentiate themselves from recent Irish and German immigrants, both of which groups were predominantly Catholic. The group later formed the "Know-Nothings", a 19th-century political party that opposed immigration to the United States, a policy known as nativism. The Know-Nothings also called themselves the "Native American Party" and were referred to in the press with the capitalized term.

In 1918, leaders of the Indigenous Peyote Religion incorporated as the Native American Church of Oklahoma. In 1956, British writer Aldous Huxley wrote to thank a correspondent for "your most interesting letter about the Native American churchmen".

The use of Native American or native American to refer to Indigenous peoples who live in the Americas came into widespread, common use during the civil rights era of the 1960s and 1970s. This term was considered to represent historical fact more accurately (i.e., "Native" cultures predated European colonization). In addition, activists also believed it was free of negative historical connotations that had come to be associated with previous terms.

Between 1982 and 1993, some American manuals of style concluded that "color terms" referring to ethnic groups, such as Black, should be capitalized as proper names, as well as Native American. By 2020, Indigenous was also included in these capitalization guidelines.

Other objections to Native American—whether capitalized or not—include a concern that it is often understood to exclude American groups outside the contiguous United States (e.g., Alaska, Hawaii, and Puerto Rico), and Indigenous groups in South America, Mexico, and Canada. The word American is sometimes questioned because the people referred to resided in the Americas before they were so named.

As of 1995, according to the US Census Bureau, 50% of people who identified as Indigenous preferred the term American Indian, 37% preferred Native American, and the remainder preferred other terms or had no preference.

=== Indigenous (1980s) ===
According to The American Heritage Dictionary, "Indigenous specifies that something or someone is native rather than coming or being brought in from elsewhere: an indigenous crop; the Ainu, a people Indigenous to the northernmost islands of Japan."

The United Nations World Summit on Sustainable Development used the term Indigenous peoples for the first time in its official political declaration in 2002. Before this date, the term was considered to be "still under debate" for usage in official UN documents.

=== Aboriginal and Aborigine ===
The English adjective aboriginal and the noun aborigine come from a Latin phrase meaning 'from the origin'; the ancient Romans used it to refer to a contemporary group, one of many ancient peoples in Italy. Until about 1910, these terms were used in English to refer to various Indigenous peoples. Today throughout most of the English-speaking world, it is most commonly understood to refer to the Indigenous Australians, with the notable exception of Canada, where the term aboriginal (but not aborigine) came into use in the Canadian Constitution Act, 1982.

=== Alaska Native ===
Alaska Native refers to the Indigenous peoples in Alaska, including the Aleut, Athabascan, Haida, Inuit (Inupiat), Tlingit, Yup'ik (Cup'ik, Alutiiq, etc.), and Yupik peoples. The term predominates because of its legal use in the Alaska Native Claims Settlement Act, and includes all the above-named peoples. While Athabascans, Haida, Eyak, and Tlingit are American Indians, Inuit, Yupik, and Unangan (Aleut) are not. Likewise, Yupik, Unangan, and Inuit are all distinct peoples with distinct languages.

==== Eskimo ====
The term Eskimo was once common, but it is now perceived as derogatory and is being replaced in common use with Inuit or individual groups' own names for themselves. As mentioned above, Yupik and Unangan are distinct from Inuit.

In addition to being a name imposed from outside rather than an Inuit term, one reason that Eskimo is considered derogatory is the widespread, but incorrect, perception that in Algonkian languages, spoken by some competitive historic tribes of present-day Canada and US, it means 'eaters of raw meat'.

==== Inuit (since 1977) ====
The Inuit Circumpolar Conference meeting in Barrow, Alaska (now Utqiaġvik), in 1977 officially adopted Inuit as a designation for the circumpolar Indigenous groups of the United States, Canada, Greenland, and Russia.

=== Amerind or Amerindian ===
The term Amerind/Amerindian is a portmanteau of American Indian. It was coined in 1902 by the American Anthropological Association, but from its creation has been controversial. It was rejected by some leading members of the Association, and while adopted by many it was never universally accepted. Usage in English occurs primarily in anthropological and linguistic contexts, rather than Native American ones; it also finds some use in news outlets in describing the Taíno people of Puerto Rico. The term "Amerind" has official status in Guyana.

== Canada ==
=== Canadian Indians (1700s – late 20th century) ===
The Canadian Indian Act, first passed in 1876, in defining the rights of people of recognized First Nations, refers to them as Indians. The responsible federal government department was the Department of Indian Affairs and Northern Development, now Indigenous and Northern Affairs Canada, headed by the Minister of Indigenous and Northern Affairs. The act officially recognizes people commonly known as Status Indians, although Registered Indian is the official term for those on the Indian Register. Lands set aside for the use of First Nations are officially known as Indian reserves (abbreviated IR on maps, etc.). The word band is used in band government. Some First Nations communities also use Indian Band in their official names.

=== Aboriginal peoples (since 1900) and Indigenous peoples ===
In Canada, the term Aboriginal peoples in Canada is used for all Indigenous peoples within the country, including the Inuit and First Nations, as well as the Métis. More recently, the term Indigenous peoples has been used more frequently and in 2015 the federal government department responsible for First Nations, Metis, and Inuit issues changed its name from Aboriginal Affairs and Northern Development Canada to Indigenous and Northern Affairs Canada.

=== First Nations (since the 1980s) ===
First Nations came into common usage in the 1980s to replace the term Indian band. Elder Sol Sanderson says that he coined the term in the early 1980s. Others state that the term came into common usage in the 1970s to avoid using the word Indian, which some people considered offensive. No legal definition of the term exists. However, the Assembly of First Nations, the national advocacy group for First Nations peoples, adopted the term in 1985. The singular commonly used is First Nations person (when gender-specific, First Nations man or First Nations woman).

=== First Peoples ===
First Peoples is a broad term that includes First Nations, Inuit, and Métis. Owing to its similarity to the terms First Nations or First Americans, these terms are sometimes used interchangeably.

=== Native Canadians ===
Native or Native Canadian is an ambiguous term, but people frequently use it in conversation or informal writing. A majority use this term for describing Indigenous peoples, including some Indigenous people themselves. This is considered to be quite offensive as Indigenous peoples living in Canada existed prior to colonization and some do not view themselves as Canadians.

=== Canadian French nomenclature ===
In Canadian French, the terms are première(s) nation(s) for First Nations and autochtone for Aboriginal (used both as a noun and adjective).

The term indien or indienne has historically been used in the legislation, notably in the Loi sur les Indiens (The Indian Act), but it is unacceptable outside of this specific context. First Nations in Québec have also called for the term amérindien to be discontinued, in favour of autochtone. The word amérindien contains the word indien ('Indian') and since they are not Indians, the word is no longer favored and it has, for example, been removed from some elementary school textbooks. The term indigène is not used as it is seen as having negative connotations because of its similarity to the French indigent ('poor'). It has also acquired further negative associations in French, owing to the indigénat code enforced in French colonial Africa between 1887 and 1947. The old French term sauvage ('wild, savage') is no longer used either, as it is considered pejorative or racist.

=== Inuit (since 1977) ===
The people of the Canadian Arctic are officially known as the Inuit, which means 'the people', or singularly, Inuk, which means 'the person', as a result of the 1977 Inuit Circumpolar Conference. Canada's Constitution Act, 1982, uses Inuit, as does the Inuit Tapiriit Kanatami, the national organization that represents the Inuit in Canada. The preferred term in Canada's Central Arctic is Inuinnaq, and in the eastern Canadian Arctic Inuit. The language is often called Inuktitut, though other local designations are also used.

=== Regional ===
==== Anishinaabe ====
The Algonquin autonym Anishinaabe (also Anishinabe, Anicinape) is used as a cross-tribal term in Algonquian-majority areas, such as Anishnabe Health, Anishnabe Education, and Training Circle. The term is also used among historically Anishinaabe peoples in the Upper Midwest region of the United States.

==== Chinook Jargon nomenclature ====
Chinook Jargon, the old trade language of the Pacific Northwest, uses siwash (an adaptation of the French sauvage) for 'Indian', 'Native American', or 'First Nations', either as adjective or noun. While normally meaning a male native, it is used in certain combinations, such as siwash cosho ('seal', literally 'Indian pig' or 'Indian pork'). Many native communities perceive the terms sauvage and siwash negatively, but others use it freely. They consider use by non-natives to be derogatory. In the creolized form of Chinook Jargon spoken at the Grand Ronde Agency in Oregon, a distinction is made between siwash and sawash. The accent in the latter is on the second syllable, resembling the French original, and is used in Grand Ronde Jargon meaning 'anything native or Indian'; by contrast, they consider siwash to be defamatory.

The Chinook Jargon term for a native woman is klootchman, an originally Nootka word adopted in regional English to mean a native woman or, as in the Jargon, all women and also anything female. It originated as a compound of Nootka łūts ('female') with the English suffix -man. Hyas klootchman tyee means 'queen', klootchman cosho means 'sow', and klootchman tenas or tenas klootchman means 'girl' or 'little girl'. Generally klootchman in regional English simply means 'native woman' and has not acquired the derisive sense of siwash or squaw. The short form klootch, encountered only in English–Chinook hybrid phrasings, is always derisive, especially in forms such as blue-eyed klootch.

== Latin America ==
In Mexico, the preferred expression used by both the Government and the media is Indigenous peoples (pueblos indígenas in Spanish).

== International ==
=== Indigenous peoples ===
During the late 20th century the term Indigenous peoples evolved into a political term that refers to ethnic groups with historical ties to groups that existed in a territory prior to colonization or formation of a nation state. The I is always capitalized as it is in references to a group of people. In the Americas, the term Indigenous peoples of the Americas was adopted, and the term is tailored to specific geographic or political regions, such as Indigenous peoples of Panama. "'Indigenous peoples' ... is a term that internationalizes the experiences, the issues and the struggles of some of the world's colonized peoples", writes Māori educator Linda Tuhiwai Smith. "The final 's' in 'Indigenous peoples' ... [is] a way of recognizing that there are real differences between different Indigenous peoples."

=== Turtle Islander ===
A rarely used term is to call the North American continent Turtle Island. Though officially named North America, a number of histories from various countries make reference to the myth of a continent existing atop a turtle's back. Though not present across all nations and countries, this symbolism and icon has spread to become nearly pan-Indigenous. As Europeans, Asians and Africans have terms that allude to their home continents, Turtle Islander is an attempt to do just that.

== Controversial terminology ==
=== Indian princess ===
In some situations, the term Indian princess is considered offensive.

There is also a positive usage among some powwow organizations, colleges, and other Indigenous groups who hold pageants and scholarship competitions, who may use the term Princess as a component in the titles they award. Generally, these events are for recognizing cultural skills and community leadership. However, some have called for participants to stop using the term Princess for these titles, due to the negative stereotypes and the discomfort the nomenclature can cause when interacting with non-Natives, and to replace the term with "more culturally relevant and accurate nomenclature".

=== Injun ===
Injun (/ˈɪn.dʒən/ IN-jən) is an originally 17th-century mispronunciation of Indian, sometimes considered offensive today, used to impersonate and sometimes mock Native Americans' or early settlers' supposed heavily accented English (e.g., "Honest Injun", "Injun time"). The word and related terms have been defined as derogatory by some Indigenous peoples and are not widely used.

=== Redskin/Red Indian ===
Both Americans and Europeans have historically called Native Americans Red Indians. The term was largely used in the 18th to 20th centuries, partially based on the color metaphors for race which colonists and settlers historically used in North America and Europe, and also to distinguish Native Americans from the Indian people of India.

The term Red Indians was also more specifically used by Europeans to refer to the Beothuk, a people living on Newfoundland who used red ochre in spring to paint not only their bodies, but also their houses, canoes, weapons, household appliances and musical instruments.

The term Redskins is now mostly seen, by Native Americans in particular, as pejorative and offensive, as it is the term that was used for body parts used as "proof of kill" when Native Americans were hunted for bounty by colonists on the frontier. There was an American National Football League team named the Washington Redskins until 2020, and "Redskin" is the name of the mascot at the Red Mesa High School on the Navajo Reservation in Teec Nos Pos, Arizona. Native Americans have been protesting against the use of these names by non-Natives since the 1970s.

The National Congress of American Indians (NCAI) maintains that names like Redskins perpetuate negative stereotypes of Native Americans, "Often citing a long held myth by non-Native people that 'Indian' mascots 'honor Native people', American sports businesses such as the NFL's Washington 'Redskins' ... continue to profit from harmful stereotypes originated during a time when white superiority and segregation were commonplace."

=== Savage ===
Anthropologists once used savage as a blanket term to refer to Indigenous peoples worldwide (for example, Bronisław Malinowski titled his 1929 study The Sexual Life of Savages in North-Western Melanesia). At the beginning of the nineteenth century, representatives of the relatively new United States government often used the term in official records when referring to Indian nations (e.g., Justice Baldwin's concurring opinion in Cherokee Nation v. Georgia). This was related to their association of non-Christian people as savages. Early anthropologist Lewis H. Morgan posited in Ancient Society (1877) a three-part evolution of societies from, in his terms, savagery through barbarism to civilization. European Christians once broadly used the word "heathens" to refer to Native Americans, a pejorative Christian term that refers to people who do not worship the Christian god.

=== Squaw ===
The English word squaw, when used to refer to Indigenous women, is considered misogynist and racist. Although there has been some controversy on the topic, it is almost always grouped with other words that carry a colonial implication of exotic inferiority based on race, such as negress. There is a movement to remove the name squaw from geographic place names across the United States. There is a minority counter-movement among a small number of academics to "reclaim" what they claim is the possible original meaning of the word, as an in-group term, which could still be offensive if used outside of that speech community. But even this usage would only be relevant to the original, Algonquian-language phonemes of the word—the small parts that make up larger, historical forms—not the English form currently used as a slur. Any effort at "reclamation" would not apply to the much larger Native American community of women who are affected by this slur, as Algonquian speakers make up only a small minority of those affected by it.

== See also ==
- Abya Yala, a proposed native name (from the Guna language) for the Americas, avoiding the mention of Amerigo Vespucci or Richard Amerike
- Eskimo § Nomenclature
