= Fight Back (book) =

1980 poetry collection

Fight Back: For the Sake of the People, for the Sake of the Land is a 1980 collection of poetry by Simon J. Ortiz, an enrolled member of the Acoma Pueblo. The original edition dedicated the book to the 300 year anniversary of the Pueblo Revolt of 1680. While the book is political, this is often overlooked by critics.

== Contents ==
In the original 1980 edition, Fight Back is dedicated to the tercentennial of the Pueblo Revolt of 1680 and contains a preface by historian Roxanne Dunbar-Ortiz. In the preface, Dunbar-Ortiz draws connections between the revolt and the circumstances facing the indigenous peoples of the American southwest in 1980, which includes the colonial desire for land by the US and "workers fighting for freedom, for liberation and for decent, healthy lives". The book is contained in a red cover, which evokes to Reginald Dyck, a professor of English at Capital University, both the Red Power movement and the symbology of historical revolutions. These elements are missing in the 1992 edition, though the later edition includes a critical introduction by Ortiz. The collection is not only a body of traditional poetry, but also combines elements of prose.

== Reception ==
While Fight Back is a political collection of poems, critics have largely ignored its political stance. Similar to the 1992 edition, critics have written about Fight Back in a conciliatory sense; some critics view the book as separating the personal and political dimensions of activism, and treat the collection as largely a traditional account of culture. Beth Langan, a professor at Columbia University, wrote in 1984 that Ortiz provides the kind of "thorough knowledge" needed to energize and enlighten indigenous people to struggle against their circumstances. Eric Cheyfitz, a professor of American studies at Cornell University, said that Ortiz's writing about land is one of "kinship" and familial bonds, and that it transforms the property-based perspective of Western law into a communal one. The poet Laura Tohe says that Ortiz's writing was exceptional, in that it was one of the few pieces of writing that spoke of the border towns that surrounded Indian reservations.
