= Betsy Warrior =

Feminist, author, and graphic artist

- Born: 1940 (age 85–86); Boston, Massachusetts
- Education: Bunker Hill Community College (AA)
- Occupations: Author; Graphic artist
- Known for: Co-founder of Cell 16

Betsy Warrior is a Boston-area feminist, author, and graphic artist. She is an advocate for women in abusive relationships, and was a founding member of the Boston-area women's liberation group Cell 16.

== Personal life ==
Warrior was born in 1940.

Warrior married at the age of 17, and suffered domestic abuse at the hands of her husband. She recalls beatings that left her "face bleeding and bruised", and cites the intervention of her family in helping her to finally leave her husband. Six years after her divorce, she adopted the name "Betsy Warrior" in honor of Native American activist Clyde Warrior, in admiration of his fight for Native American rights. Warrior is a descendant of the Mi'kmaq tribe of Canada.

Warrior earned her associate degree from Bunker Hill Community College in 2007.

== Activism ==
In 1968, along with Roxanne Dunbar and Dana Densmore, Warrior helped found Cell 16, a "women's liberation group" that advocated for women's rights, pay equality, reproductive rights, and self-defense. Cell 16 was considered the face of the women's liberation movement in Boston at the time.

That same year, Warrior, Dunar, and Densmore also published a collection of essays entitled "No More Fun and Games: A Journal of Female Liberation". Described as addressing "women who feel they are oppressed", the essays detailed the actions a woman should take to liberate herself. Warrior's essays criticized male aggression as well as members of the movement who had too much of a competitive mentality.

While with Cell 16, Warrior created a poster that read: "Disarm rapists/Smash sexism", depicting a woman fighting off a would-be rapist. The poster was popular within the anti-rape movement.

In 1974, Warrior published The Houseworker's Handbook along with Lisa Leghorn, a fellow activist Warrior met at the Cambridge Women's Center. Warrior equated domestic violence to "how women were devalued in society", and how a woman might stay in an abusive relationship because they lack the means or ability to escape. While at the Cambridge Women's Center, Warrior helped to open the first battered women's shelter on the east coast. Warrior made another poster that read “Strike! While the Iron Is Hot!” which became popular in Italy with advocates of the Wages for Housework movement.

In 1976, Warrior published Working on Wife Abuse (later renamed the Battered Women's Directory), an international directory listing programs and individuals advocating for women who were victims of domestic violence. The publication was cited for spreading awareness on the issue of domestic abuse and Warrior received numerous offers of help from other women who read the book. The last edition was published in 1989.

Warrior has developed a series of posters on international women's rights which honor women activists from around the world.

== Awards and recognitions ==
Warrior was awarded the first Jane Doe Unsung Hero award in 1993. She has been recognized by Women's eNews and Boston's Woman Magazine.

== Published works ==
- Houseworker's Handbook (written with Lisa Leghorn): Woman's Center (1975).
- Working on Wife Abuse (1977). ISBN 9780960154418
- Battered Women's Directory (1982). ISBN 9780960154456
- Housework: Slavery Or a Labor of Love? (1986). ISBN 9780960154449
