= Eddinger =

Eddinger is a surname. Notable people with the surname include:

- Mark Eddinger (born 1958), American musician, composer, arranger, and music producer
- Pam Eddinger, American college president
- Wallace Eddinger (1881–1929), American actor
