= American Indian literary nationalism =

American Indian literary nationalism is the name of an intellectual and activist movement within Native American literary studies that began in the late 20th century in the United States. It asserts that Native American literatures should be discussed as cultural works from separate, distinct nations, rather than as from ethnic groups of the United States.

== Origins ==
Simon J. Ortiz's 1981 essay "Towards a National Indian Literature: Cultural Authenticity in Nationalism" is generally held to be the most significant precursor of the movement. Activists build their justification for an American Indian Literary Nationalism on Kimberly Blaeser's argument for a critical approach to Indigenous literature that begins with the meaning a text itself produces.

== Definition ==
American Indian literary nationalists hold that American Indian literature is best studied through the lens of American Indian cultural and philosophical traditions. When the earliest works now categorized as nationalist were first published, this "grounded" approach ran counter both to the ethnologically inflected literary criticism of the 1970s and early 1980s, and also to the postmodern critical methods that had largely succeeded these in the 1990s.

The nationalists considered the first of these approaches as an attempt to keep Native cultures primarily as the object of Anglo-American study, while the second relied too strongly on Eurowestern models and thus again served to deprive Native peoples of a legitimate voice.

Nationalist criticism, by contrast, would keep crucial political issues, such as tribal sovereignty, at the forefront. Critics believed that rather than treating American Indian literatures as another ethnic literature within the American canon, these works should be seen as the product of separate nations, and studied as such.

== Key works ==
Robert Allen Warrior's book Tribal Secrets: Recovering American Indian Traditions was the first full-length work of nationalist criticism. In it, he discusses the Osage novelist John Joseph Mathews and the Standing Rock Sioux philosopher Vine Deloria, Jr., placing both in a specifically American Indian intellectual context.

This book was followed by Jace Weaver's That the People May Live, which proposes an ethic of "communitism" as a key way to understand tribal literatures. Finally, Craig Womack's Red on Red: Native American Literary Separatism completed the emergence of the three key thinkers of the movement. Womack's book was the first full-length monograph to concentrate on the literary output of a single tribal nation, leading some to label it "tribalcentric".

Elvira Pulitano's Toward a Native American Critical Theory (2003) made multiple statements about the work of Warrior and Womack that the three major nationalists held to be inaccurate. Weaver, Warrior and Womack collaborated (along with Abenaki scholar Lisa Brooks) on American Indian Literary Nationalism (2006), a positional statement of the nationalist cause.

== See also ==
- Native American literature
- Native American Renaissance
- Native American studies
