= Mary Ann Weathers =

Black feminist

- Occupation: Writer

Mary Ann Weathers, also known as Maryanne Weathers, wrote the essay "An Argument for Black Women’s Liberation as a Revolutionary Force," "one of the pioneering texts" of Black feminism. In it she "challenges the black liberation movement to embrace women's liberation which she hopes would be responsive to the needs of all oppressed people." She highlights ways that improving conditions for women would help all: if buses were safer for women to ride on, free of harassment, for example, men and children would be safer too. Likewise, better employment, desegregated schools, and improved public spaces were all examples of women's interests that would serve everyone in the community, not only at the present moment but also for future generations. Weathers rejected the notion that “black women’s liberation is [...] antimale; any such sentiment or interpretation as such cannot be tolerated. It must be taken clearly for what it is—pro-human for all peoples.”

The essay was published in Cell 16's No Fun and Games: A Journal of Female Liberation in 1969 as well as in Leslie Tanner's 1970 Voices for Female Liberation, circulated among consciousness-raising groups in New York City in the 1970s, and in other anthologies in the following decades.

Weathers was a member of the Student Nonviolent Coordinating Committee's Black Women's Liberation Committee. She was also a member of Boston Female Liberation.
