= Bunker Hill Community College =

Community college in Boston, Massachusetts, U.S.

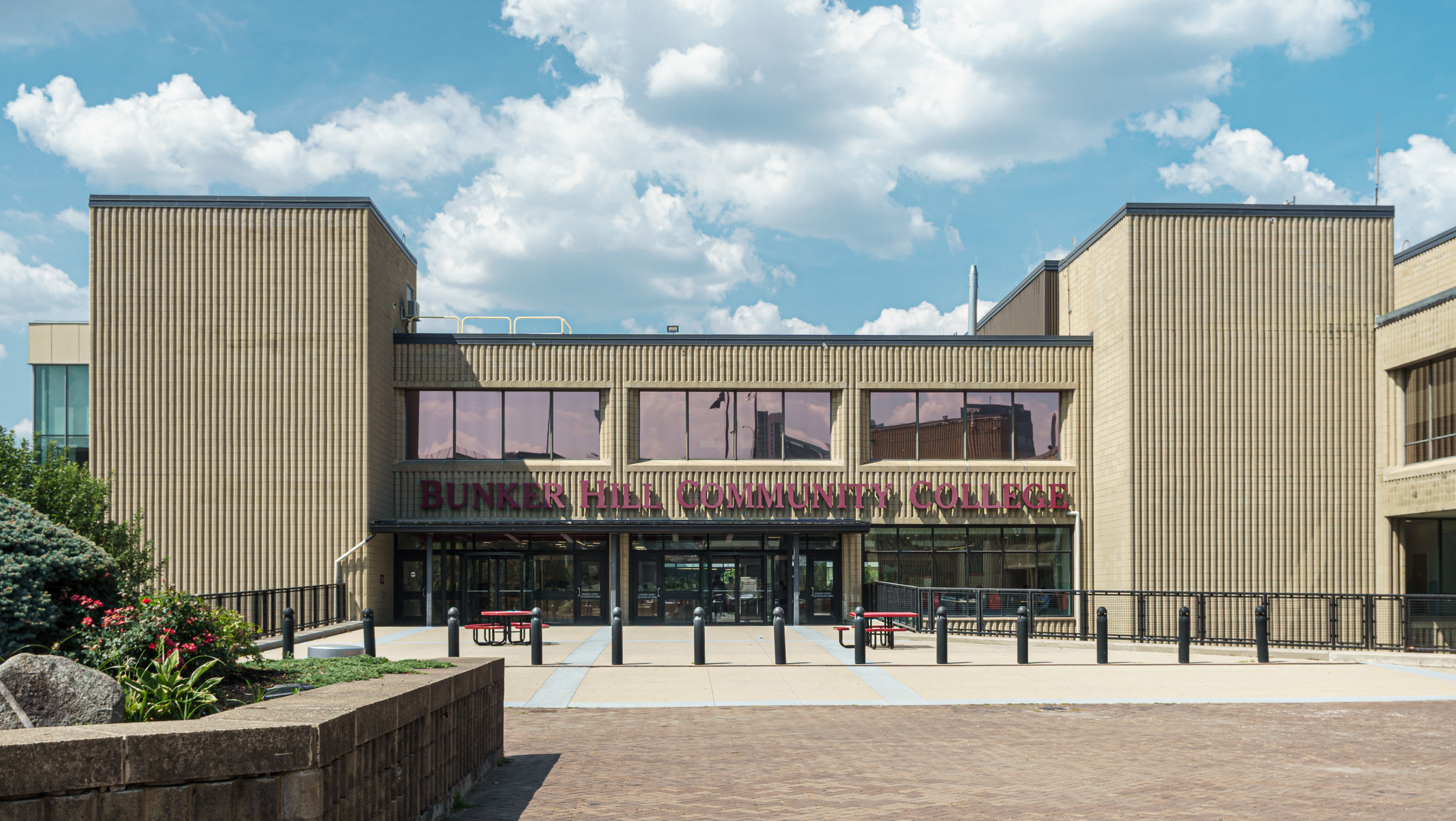
- The main entrance to Bunker Hill Community College (The "B" building)
- Type: Public community college
- Established: 1973
- Accreditation: NECHE
- President: Pam Eddinger
- Students: 8,439 (fall 2022)
- Location: Boston, Massachusetts, United States; 42.375566°N 71.069816°W
- Campus: Urban
- Mascot: Bulldog
- Website: www.bhcc.edu

Bunker Hill Community College (BHCC) is a public community college with multiple campuses in the Greater Boston area. Founded in 1973 in the Charlestown neighborhood of Boston, Massachusetts, United States, BHCC provides higher education and job training services at two campuses and three satellite locations.

BHCC is the state's largest community college, enrolling more than 13,000 students in day, afternoon, evening, late-evening, weekend, and web-based distance-learning courses. It is also one of the state's most diverse institutions of higher education: 24% of the students are African-American, 24% are white or caucasian, and 24% Latino. More than half are women. Students' average age is 27. The college enrolls more than 800 international students who come from about 100 countries and speak more than 75 languages.

== History ==
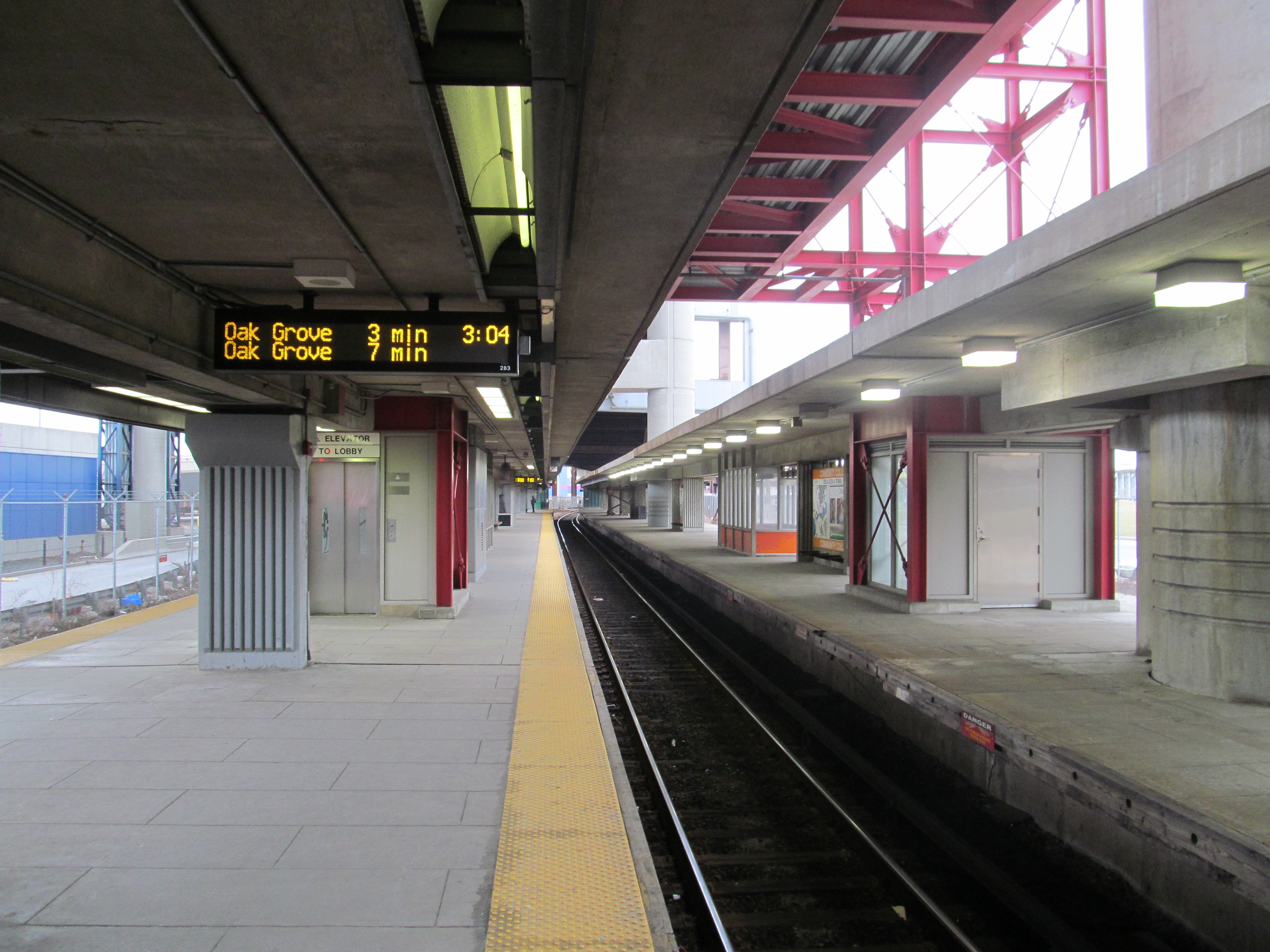
Community College station on the MBTA Orange Line. The station is named after and adjacent to BHCC.

Bunker Hill Community College's 42-acre (17 ha; 0.066 sq mi) main campus is in Boston's Charlestown neighborhood, on the site of the former Charlestown State Prison that closed in 1955. It is served by the MBTA subway's Orange Line at Community College station, and sits near the site of the 1775 Battle of Bunker Hill in the American Revolutionary War. Bunker Hill Community College is accredited by the New England Commission of Higher Education.

Since 1987, a second campus has provided higher education and job training to residents of Chelsea, Revere, Everett, East Boston, Winthrop and other surrounding communities. This campus moved several times until settling in 1998 into a former post office in Bellingham Square. The two-story 1910 brick structure had been vacant for a decade before being donated to the Commonwealth of Massachusetts.

In Boston's South End, BHCC worked with Inquilinos Boricuas en Acción (IBA), a community-based organization, to establish the Pathway Technology Campus (PTC) in Villa Victoria, a predominantly-Latino affordable-housing community. PTC helps residents of the South End and Lower Roxbury earn a GED certificate, take adult education (ESL, Basic English and Math) classes, and to enroll in community college-level classes.

Since 2007, BHCC has operated an East Boston Satellite campus at the Education and Training Institute of the East Boston Neighborhood Health Center. It offers introductory and allied health courses in the evening during the fall, spring and summer terms.

Established in fall 2009, the Malden Satellite is based at Malden High School in Malden, Massachusetts, and offers introductory and college-level courses in the evening during the fall and spring semesters.

The college was featured in the 1997 movie Good Will Hunting, as the location where Sean Maguire (Robin Williams) teaches.

On July 1, 2013, Pam Y. Eddinger became BHCC's seventh president, replacing Mary L. Fifield, who retired after 16 years.

== Notable alumni ==
- Bobby Kelly, comedian
- Dana Rosenblatt, boxer
- Stephen Stat Smith, state representative
- Tamerlan Tsarnaev, perpetrator of the Boston Marathon bombing - did not graduate
- THE BB02, Nigerian singer and record label boss
- Walter Varela, professional soccer player
- Betsy Warrior, feminist and author
- Christopher Worrell, politician
