= Drowning in Fire =

Novel by Craig Womack

- Author: Craig S. Womack
- Language: English
- Publisher: The University of Arizona Press
- Publication date: September 1, 2001
- Publication place: United States
- Pages: 304
- ISBN: 9780816521685

Drowning in Fire is a novel by Craig Womack published in 2001 by The University of Arizona Press. The story follows a young queer person, Josh Henneha, coming of age in the Muscogee Creek Nation in Eufaula, Oklahoma. The novel is told across the 20th century through the perspectives of Josh and his great-aunt Lucille Self.

== Plot ==
Drowning in Fire follows the life of Josh Henneha as he spends his childhood years within the Muscogee Creek Nation in rural Oklahoma, and it takes the reader through Josh's immersive dreams. Josh’s self-understanding is pulled between listening to his Christian parents or the stories of his elder Creek family members, such as his great-aunt Lucille Self. Often seen as an outlier in his community, he is torn between the uncontrollable yearning he has for Jimmy Alexander and the shame he feels about his sexuality.

With the help of his Aunt Lucy’s storytelling, Josh is able to fly through time and dive deeper into the history of his Creek roots. After witnessing his people’s history through his vivid dreams, Josh is able to create a better understanding of himself. The story continues into Josh’s adult years as he revisits his past home and desires.

== Characters ==
- Josh Henneha: The novel’s protagonist; much of the story is told from his perspective. Josh is an outsider in his community throughout his life because he is both introverted and queer.
- Lucille Self: She is the great-aunt to Josh Henneha and married to Glen. Some of the novel is told from her perspective as a child in the early 1900s. She is described as masculine due to the way she dresses and her trumpet playing. As an elderly woman, she is diagnosed with dementia and dies after contracting pneumonia.
- Jimmy Alexander: He is of mixed race, being both Black and Creek. He is often described to be both masculine and talented at basketball, and he becomes Josh Henneha’s childhood crush. As a teenager, he has a sexual encounter with Josh, which ends with Josh punching him. After college, Jimmy is diagnosed with HIV and enters a relationship with Josh.
- Lenny Henneha: He is Josh Henneha's cousin and reluctantly allows Josh to join his childhood friend group. He later has a sexual encounter with Jimmy.
- Grandpa: He is paternal Grandfather of Josh Henneha. He spends much of his time fishing, occasionally with his grandson, and storytelling.
- "Daddy" Self: He is a white man, father to Lucille, adopted guardian of Dave, and married to Rachel Self. He abuses both his daughters and his wife and denies them access to their Creek heritage.
- Dave: He is an orphan adopted by the Self family to take advantage of his inheritance. He is a member of the Wolf clan and nephew of Tarbie.
- Seborn Bigpond: He lives and farms with his partner Tarbie and is a political activist for the Creek Nation in the early 1900s.
- Valeria Talamantez: She is part of the only Mexican family in Eufaula. In childhood, she chases and torments Josh Henneha and fights with Jimmy Alexander.
- Clarence Albert (C.A.): He grew up in Eufaula with Jimmy and Josh and is Comanche. He is bullied as a kid due to his feminine demeanor. Everyone avoids him except Jimmy, with whom he becomes lifelong friends.
- Tarbie: He is Dave's uncle and Seborn's partner. He was a political activist for the Creek Nation in the early 1900s.

== Major themes ==
=== Gender and sexuality ===
Mark Rifkin argues that Drowning in Fire explores how a representation of queer experiences can highlight colonial impacts on the identity and expression of Muscogee people. Rifkin states that the use of sexuality in the novel illuminates how "compulsory heterosexuality helps naturalize the foreclosure of forms of collective identity not sanctioned by U.S. Indian law and policy". Rifkin also posits that the novel uses themes of homoeroticism regarding Creek people to emphasize how the legacy of allotment and the Dawes Act aligns with straightness. Through the novel's challenges of heteronormativity and traditional gender roles, possibilities of self-representation, separate from the status quo, are also highlighted.

Josh and Jimmy are both queer characters that dominate Drowning in Fire. In the novel, Josh has a hard time accepting his sexuality due to his treatment from other characters. Josh is looked down on for not being traditionally masculine and is called gay as an insult; thus, resulting in insecurity in his sexuality.

=== Race ===
In Drowning in Fire, Womack welcomes diversity within the Creek Nation by accepting Creek individuals who come from distinct racial backgrounds. He emphasizes that Creek people are not a culturally homogenous group but rather a group of diverse backgrounds. Through the novel, Womack posits that different backgrounds do not make their Creekness inauthentic; instead, it permits the emergence of fresh cultures without harming Creek culture. In the novel, Womack demonstrates racial diversity through Jimmy’s character. Visibly, others might label Jimmy as Black, but he identifies more with his Creek identity because of the community he grew up in. Womack’s depiction of race shows how the intersection of different identities within Creek culture does not damage it because it is flexible.

=== Religion ===
Drowning in Fire presents the complications of Christian ideologies within the Creek community, and the consequences they impose. Mark Rifkin writes, "Drowning in Fire historicizes the dissemination of such Christian ideology among the Creeks, presenting it as enmeshed in detribalizing U.S. policy initiatives", noting how the U.S. enforced Christian beliefs to practice social order. In the novel, Josh begins to confront his feelings for Jimmy but his religious background influences him to not act on his desires. Rifkin suggests that the shame associated with homosexuality present in Josh's internal monologue "is an imperial inheritance that both enacts and effaces the broader assault on Creek peoplehood."

== Style ==
=== Polyvocal narration ===
Most of the story is told through Josh’s perspective as he learns to travel across time and space through his dreams. John Gamber notes the different perspectives offered by each character. During Lucy's timeline, her story is told through flashbacks during her childhood years (in the early 1900s). Jimmy's perspective is offered only once during the novel. Through Jimmy's narrative, the audience is able to witness a different perspective of Native identity. However, instead of struggling to find a balance between his two cultures, Jimmy embraces both positions.

=== Frame story ===
In the novel, Womack uses the frame story technique to provide context and structure to the narrative. Michelle Henry explains "From the very beginning, the narrative voice shifts back and forth from first to third person, and where one character begins a story, the main character, Josh, may enter and experience the story for himself". According to Henry, the "fluidity in storytelling" allows stories from different generations to intertwine and enhance each other. Through this technique, Womack is able to explore how "the Creek oral tradition and history are unbound and brought to life through the shift from listener to storyteller."

== Awards ==
- Winner of the 2002 Wordcraft Circle Writer of the Year
