= THE BB02 =

Nigerian musical artist

THE BB02 Jesse Adesotu I.E. Woghiren-Obamedo
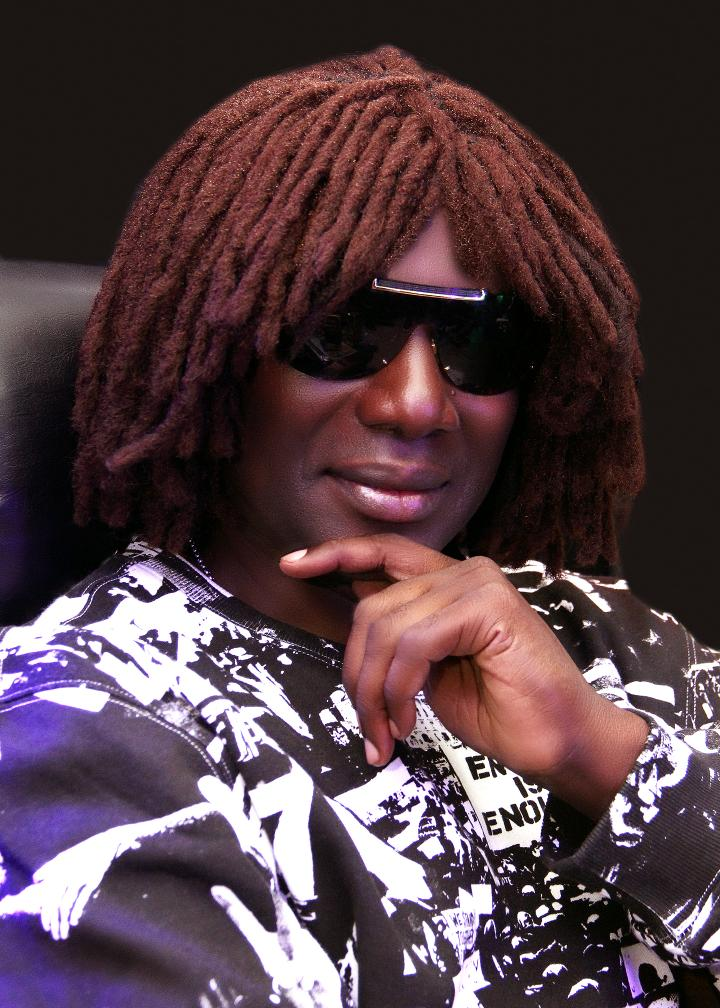

Background information
- Born: Jesse Adesotu Woghiren; June 7
- Origin: Edo State, Nigeria
- Genres: Hip hop; Pop; Afrofusion; Gidiga-Latido; Knacks & Knocks
- Occupation: Rapstar or Rapper - Entertainer - Songwriter - Producer - Artist/Performer/Musician - Fashion Icon - TV - Social Media Influencer - Civil Activist - Record Label Executive - Real Estate Investor
- Instruments: Drums, Percussions, Vocals. Piano/Keyboard, Multi-Instrumentalist etc
- Years active: 2005–present
- Label: Bigmanity Music Group
- Website: www.thebb02.com

Jesse Adesotu Woghiren (born June 7), known professionally as THE BB02, is an American-Nigerian artist, songwriter, record label executive. He is the founder, chief executive officer of Bigmanity music also known as Beyondspheres Entertainments, a music record label and THE LEMLINES (Liquids Emotions Musical Lines), which serves as a platform for promoting artists signed to the label.

THE BB02, has produced several songs that have gained international recognition, including titles such as The New Kid on the Block, Pull Up Ina Maserati, Thema Want to Jogodo, Eyes Dea Red, Zinga Zinga Lean, Feeling What I Feel, Hallelujah Is Now My Daily Thing, All the Way to the Top, Rich African Love, and Invest in Your Body.

== Early life and education ==
THE BB02 was born into the royal family of Chief Egbe (Omedo) Woghiren of King Obanosa in Benin City and attributes his passion for music to the influence of his parent as his mother used to perform in the U.S. for family events and other gatherings while his grandfather, the First Obamedo of the Benin Kingdom, a descendant of King Obanosa was a renowned musician in his time.

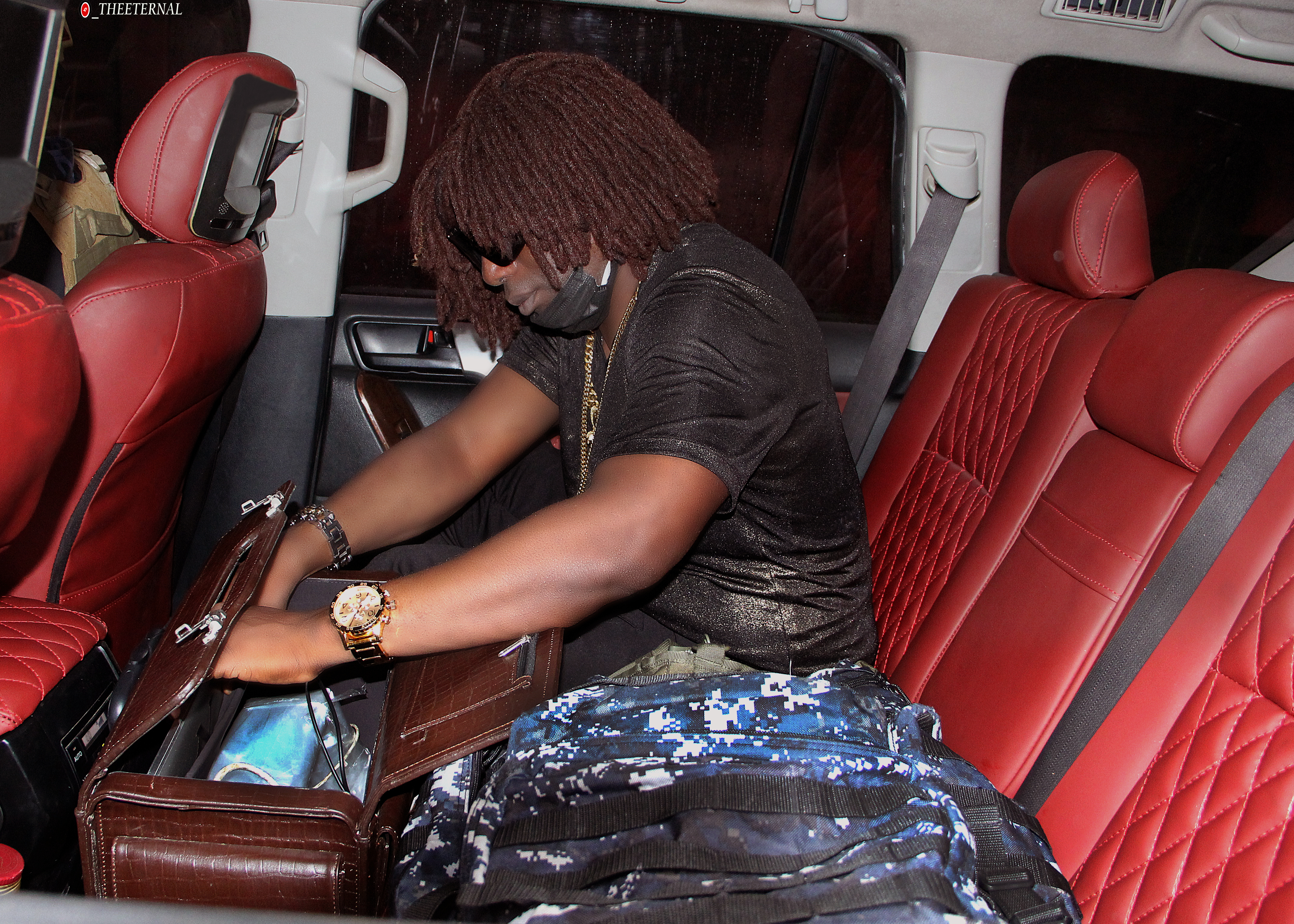
The BB02, 2022

BB02 attended Bunker Hill Community College and Northeastern University in Boston, USA where he studied Music & Business Management/Intellectual Properties Laws.

== Music career ==
THE BB02 began classically singing at a young age due to the influence of his parent and grew up in the U.S.

He founded first an American-based record label “BeyondTheSpheres Music” in 2011 and later coming back to Nigeria, he founded Bigmanity music in 2018, and his “Collectives” Imprint “The Lemlines” for scouting new talent.

In August 2022, he dropped a new song “Eye Dey Red” under Bigmanity Records, which addresses the troubled political trend around the globe.

Beyond music, he is the founder of BLOTRATFX fashion house and has other real estate investments. His creative works have reportedly been featured on platforms such as Netflix and Hulu and used in independent films with some of these works registered with the U.S. Library of Congress.

== Discography ==
- "To the Top"
- "Rich African love"
- "Agolo"
- "TNKOTB"
- "Zinga Zinga Ling"
- "Vibes" (2019)
- "Halleluyah " (2020)
- "Dance like Say" (2021)
- "Kpor Kpor Kpor" (2021)
- "Eye dey Red" (2022)

" "Benin Man" (2025)
