= Cell 16 =

Former US feminist group (1968–1973)

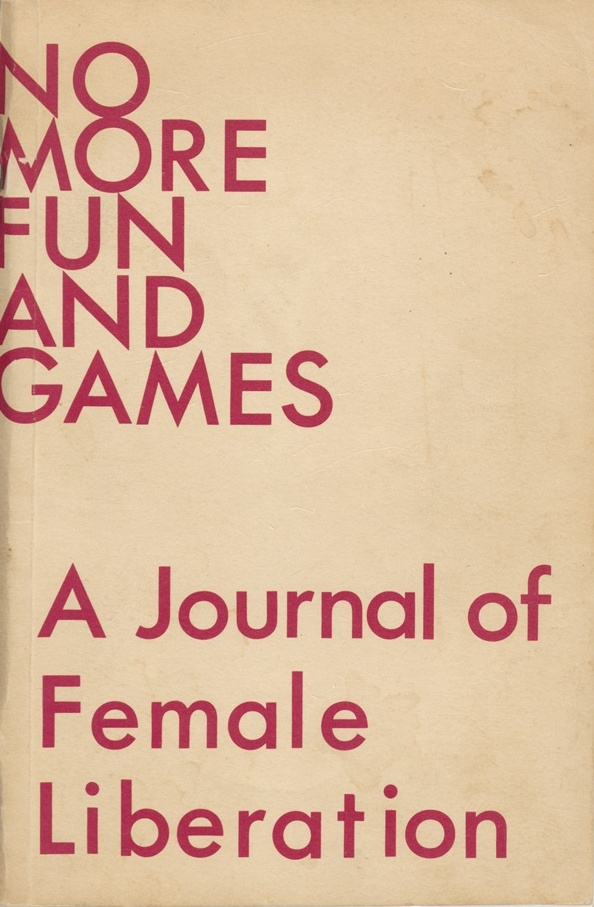
- Cover of Cell 16's journal No More Fun and Games, issue 2
- Formation: 1968; 58 years ago
- Founder: Roxanne Dunbar-Ortiz
- Founded at: Boston, Massachusetts, US
- Dissolved: 1973; 53 years ago

Cell 16 (1968-1973) was a progressive, radical feminist organization active in the United States known for its program of self-defense training (specifically karate), opposition to violence against women, and its analyses of relations between men and women in dating culture, politics and the economics of unpaid labor in the home. Co-founded by Roxanne Dunbar and Dana Densmore in 1968, Cell 16 included early members Betsy Warrior, Abby Rockefeller and Jayne West. Cell 16 was sometimes mischaracterized as promoting celibacy or separatism for its suggestion that women remain autonomous from men's groups and avoid romantic entanglements with either men or women, which would take away time and energy better spent on women's rights. The organization had a journal titled No More Fun and Games, which exerted a strong influence over the development of the second wave of feminism.

== History ==
In the summer of 1968, Roxanne Dunbar placed an advertisement in a Boston, Massachusetts, underground newspaper calling for a "Female Liberation Front". The original membership also included Hillary Langhorst, Sandy Bernard, Dana Densmore (the daughter of Donna Allen), Betsy Warrior, Ellen O'Donnell, Jayne West, Mary Ann Weathers, Maureen Maynes, Gail Murray, and Abby Rockefeller. The group's name was meant "to emphasize that they were only one cell of an organic movement" and referenced the address of their meetings – 16 Lexington Avenue.

No More Fun and Games ceased publication in 1973. Cell 16 disbanded in 1973 as well.

== Ideology ==
Founded in 1968 by Roxanne Dunbar, Cell 16 has been cited as the first organization to advance the concept of separatist feminism. Cultural historian Alice Echols cites Cell 16 as an example of feminist heterosexual separatism, as the group never advocated lesbianism as a political strategy. Echols credits Cell 16's work for "helping establishing the theoretical foundation for lesbian separatism." In No More Fun and Games, the organization's journal, Roxanne Dunbar and Lisa Leghorn advised women to "separate from men who are not consciously working for female liberation", and advised periods of celibacy, rather than lesbian relationships, which some lesbian groups labeled as "nothing more than a personal solution".

In Roxanne Dunbar-Ortiz's book, Outlaw Woman, in referring to an article by member Dana Densmore titled "On Celibacy" that was published in the first issue of No More Fun and Games (1970), Dunbar-Ortiz explains, "That essay mythologized our group as having taken "vows of celibacy."
