= Loaded: A Disarming History of the Second Amendment =

Book by Roxanne Dunbar-Ortiz

- Author: Roxanne Dunbar-Ortiz
- Cover artist: Herb Thornby
- Language: English
- Genre: History
- Publisher: City Lights Books, San Francisco
- Publication date: 2018-01-23
- Publication place: United States
- Media type: Print (paperback, Kindle & audio)
- Pages: 236
- OCLC: 1035450533

Loaded: A Disarming History of the Second Amendment is a book written by the historian Roxanne Dunbar-Ortiz and published by City Lights Books. It takes a close and unexpected look at the historical origins of the Second Amendment to the United States Constitution.

== Synopsis ==
Loaded begins with Dunbar-Ortiz writing about her own experience with guns as a member of a radical left-wing "women's action-study group" in 1970. She uses her own history of falling in, and then out of, love with guns to begin an exploration of the larger U.S. love-fest with guns, and where this comes from. In nine chapters she describes the historical development of what she calls "a dangerous gun culture" intimately connected to the Second Amendment, that "has entitled white nationalism, racialized dominance, and social control through violence."

Chapters One and Two describe how the Second Amendment allowed and legalized the "total war" settlers were already "waging against Indigenous Peoples to dispossess them of their land", as well as permitting settler control of "Black populations - enslaved and free". This was an important part of U.S. expansion "throughout the continent and into the Caribbean and Pacific." In these chapters, Dunbar-Ortiz refutes an argument popular among gun-control advocates demonstrating that the Second Amendment "specifically gave individuals and families the right to form volunteer militias to attack Indians and take their land."

Chapter Three examines little discussed provisions of the Second Amendment which required every citizen "to capture and return people caught escaping from slavery" and empowered slavers to organize "militias to help enforce slavery."

Chapters Four and Five explore the celebration of gun culture that led "generations" of American children to play "cowboys and Indians", and lionized "pro-slavery guerrillas" and "ruthless mass murderers" like Quantrill's Raiders, Jesse and Frank James, and the Younger brothers who became Robin Hood-like "iconic national celebrities". It also explores the national mythology surrounding "the hunter" which romanticised figures like Daniel Boone and gun use during the period when the U.S. was "committing genocide against Native Americans."

Chapter Six looks into the ways that the Second Amendment, especially the right to bear arms, is treated like a "God-given covenant" in the U.S.

Chapters Seven and Eight trace the rising numbers of mass shootings in the U.S. with the parallel increase of "organized gun-rights advocacy" and the "revival and rise of white nationalist groups and militias."

Chapter Nine digs into the national resistance, among both pro and anti-gun advocates, to understand this history of the "connections between the Second Amendment and white nationalism."

Overall, the book attempts to "confront fundamental aspects of U.S. history" embedded within "the original meaning and intention of the Second Amendment" that are "too often overlooked or denied".

== Reception ==
Adam Hochschild, writing in The New York Review of Books, described it as "like a blast of fresh air." Mark Trecka in the Los Angeles Review of Books writes, "Dunbar-Ortiz constructs a vivid outline of the genocidal colonization of the United States.... her thesis here is certainly as compelling as — and perhaps even more shattering than — any she has proposed in previous works." The New Republic reviewer Patrick Blanchfield praised the book as "brilliant" and said the book's "analysis, erudite and unrelenting, exposes blind spots not just among conservatives, but, crucially, among liberals as well". He continued, "Throughout, and even when uneven, her narrative is devastating ... As a portrait of the deepest structures of American violence, Loaded is an indispensable book." The San Francisco Chronicle's review finds a few questionable arguments, but notes that at a time when "many Americans...have lost their patience with feckless lawmakers and AR-15 fetishists" the moment may demand "unambiguous language" which Dunbar-Ortiz "is well-positioned to meet". Jonah Raskin, writing in the HuffPost gave the book a scathing review, calling it a screed and saying "Dunbar-Ortiz selects those incidents that support her argument and ignores those that don't support her argument." along with saying she has an in issue with "white men".
