= Craig Womack =

Author and Professor

Craig Womack is an author and professor of Native American literature. He self-identifies as being of Creek and Cherokee descent, but is not enrolled with any Native American tribe. Womack wrote the book Red on Red: Native American Literary Separatism, a book of literary criticism which argues that the dominant approach to academic study of Native American literature is incorrect. Instead of using poststructural and postcolonial approaches that do not have their basis in Native culture or experience, Womack claims the work of the Native critic should be to develop tribal models of criticism. In 2002, Craig won Wordcraft Circle Writer of the Year Winner. Along with Robert Allen Warrior, Jace Weaver and Greg Sarris, Womack asserted themselves as a nationalist (American Indian literary nationalism), which is part of an activist movement. The movement significantly altered the critical methodologies used to approach Native American literature.

Womack has also produced a novel, Drowning in Fire, about the lives of young gay Native Americans.

Currently, Womack is employed as a professor at Emory University, specializing in Native American literature.

== Personal life ==
Womack said that both of his parents were "mixed-blood native people" of Muscogee and Cherokee descent. He is not enrolled in any Muscogee or Cherokee tribe. Despite having no legal status as Native American, Womack has said he considers his physical appearance to "fit the phenotypical stereotypes of indigenous peoples". He has claimed that police and authorities have subjected him to racism because they can always tell he is "Indian" by his appearance.

== Bibliography ==
=== Books ===
- Drowning in Fire, 200/1 ISBN 9780816521678
- Red on Red: Native American literary separatism, 1999. ISBN 0816630224
- Teuton Reasoning Together: The Native Critics Collective University of Oklahoma Press, 2008. ISBN 9780806138879
- Art as performance, story as criticism: reflections on native literary aesthetics University of Oklahoma Press, 2009. ISBN 080614064X

=== Presentations ===
- "Baptists and Witches: Multiple Jurisdictions in a Muskogee Creek Story" Southern Spaces. July 17, 2007.
- "Cosmopolitanism and Nationalism in Native American Literature: A Panel Discussion." Southern Spaces, 21 June 2011.

== See also ==
- Native American studies
