= Pam Eddinger =

American college president

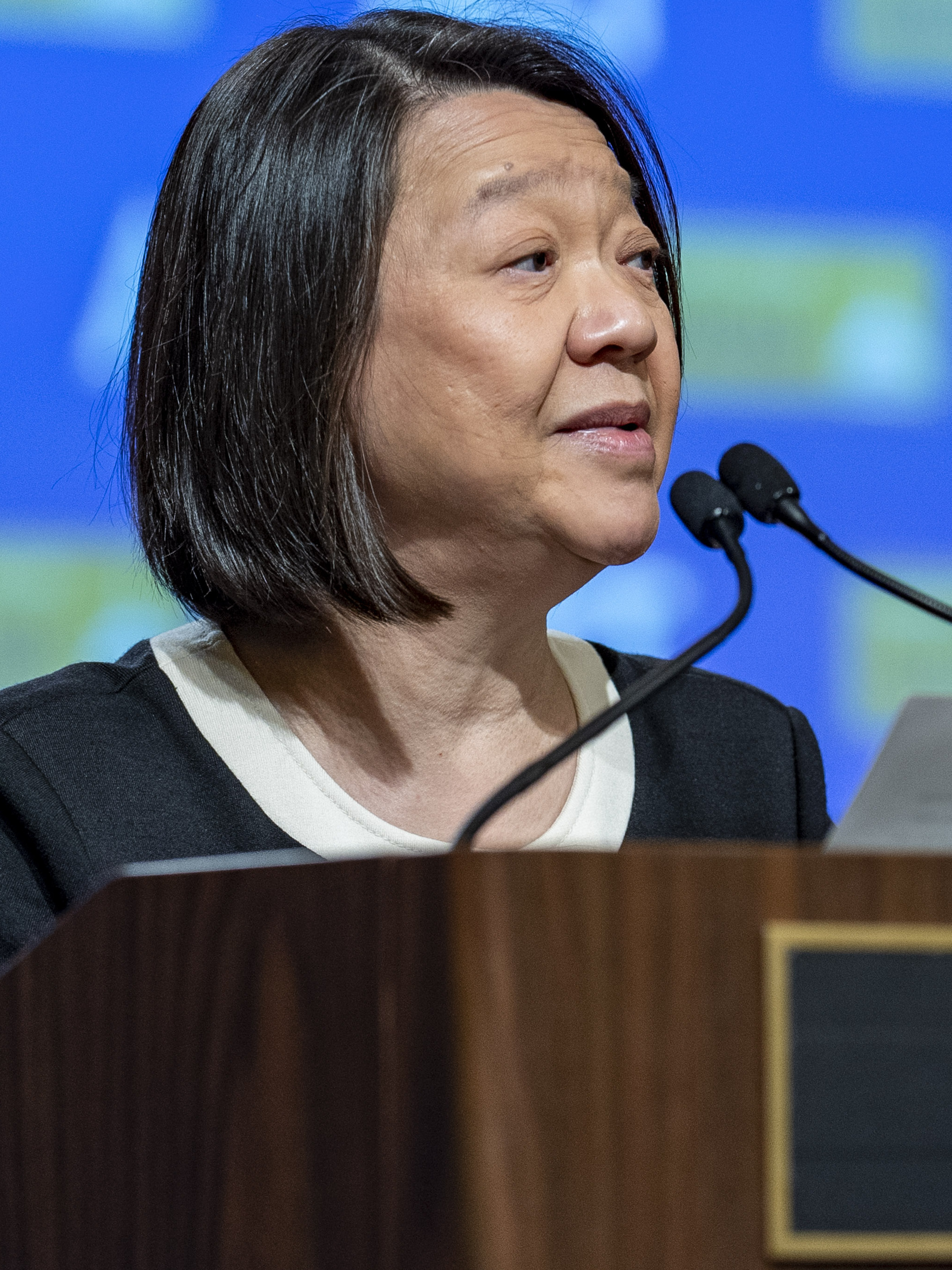
- Born: Pam Yue; Hong Kong
- Other names: Pam Y. Eddinger, Pam Yue Eddinger
- Education: Barnard College; Columbia University
- Spouse: James Eddinger

President of Bunker Hill Community College
- Incumbent
- Assumed office 2013

President of Moorpark College
- In office 2008–2013

Pam Eddinger is the seventh president of the Bunker Hill Community College in Massachusetts, United States. Eddinger is the first Chinese-American President in the Massachusetts Community College System.

== Early life ==
Eddinger was born as MoKit Yue in Hong Kong. Eddinger's ancestry is Chinese. At age 11, Eddinger emigrated to Miami, Florida. Eddinger's mother was a seamstress. Eddinger's father was a waiter. Eddinger has a sister and a brother. Eddinger attended Miami Edison Senior High School.

== Education ==
Eddinger earned a BA degree in English from Barnard College in New York City in 1982. She then earned a MA and a PhD in modern Japanese literature from Columbia University.

== Career ==
Eddinger has served community colleges since 1993 in various leadership roles, including instruction, student services, marketing, institutional advancement and legislative relations. She also served as adjunct lecturer at Boston University in modern Japanese literature.

In 2002, Eddinger became the vice president of academic affairs and the dean of the faculty at Massachusetts Bay Community College, a position that she held until 2004. She served as the executive vice president from 2004 until 2005.

Eddinger became the executive vice president of Moorpark College in Moorpark, California. She served as the president of the community college from 2008 to 2013.

On July 1, 2013, Eddinger became the 7th president of Bunker Hill Community College in Boston, Massachusetts. Eddinger succeeded Mary L. Fifield, who had retired after 16 years in post. Eddinger is also the first Chinese-American President of the Massachusetts Community College System. Eddinger was honored in 2016 by the Obama White House as a Champion of Change.

== Personal life ==
Eddinger's husband was James Eddinger.
