= Robert Allen Warrior =

Robert Warrior (born 1963, Osage), is a scholar and Hall Distinguished Professor of American Literature and Culture at the University of Kansas. With Paul Chaat Smith, he co-authored Like a Hurricane: The Indian Movement from Alcatraz to Wounded Knee. He is generally recognized, along with Craig Womack, as being one of the founders of American Indian literary nationalism. Warrior served as president of the American Studies Association from 2016 to 2017.

== Early life and education ==
Robert Allen Warrior was born in Marion County, Kansas, in 1963. Warrior belongs to the Grayhorse District of the Osage Nation.

He earned a bachelor's degree in speech communication from Pepperdine University, a master's degree in religion from Yale University, and a doctoral degree in systematic theology from Union Theological Seminary in New York City.

== Career ==
In 1999, Warrior taught at Cornell University. Warrior previously taught at Stanford University, the University of Oklahoma, and the University of Illinois. He has served as president of the American Studies Association (ASA) and helped found the Native American and Indigenous Studies Association (NAISA).

== Honors ==
In 2018, the American Academy of Arts and Sciences inducted Warrior.

== Publications ==
- The People and the Word: Reading Native Nonfiction (University of Minnesota Press, 2006) ISBN 978-0-81664-617-3, part of the Indigenous Americas series
- with Paul Chaat Smith, Like a Hurricane: The Indian Movement from Alcatraz to Wounded Knee (The New Press, 1996) ISBN 978-1-56584-402-5
- Tribal Secrets: Recovering American Indian Intellectual Traditions (University of Minnesota Press, 1994) ISBN 978-0-81662-379-2
- Canaanites, cowboys, and Indians Union Seminary Quarterly Review, 59(1-2), 1–8.
- co-author of American Indian Literary Nationalism (University of New Mexico Press, 2008)
- co-author of Reasoning Together: the Native Critics Collective (University of Oklahoma Press, 2009).
