= Tribal College Journal =

American nonprofit organization

- Editor: Bradley Shreve, Ph.D.
- Categories: Higher education
- Frequency: Quarterly
- Publisher: American Indian Higher Education Consortium
- First issue: 1989
- Country: United States
- Website: tribalcollegejournal.org
- ISSN: 1052-5505

The Tribal College Journal is a nonprofit media organization operating under the auspices of the American Indian Higher Education Consortium (AIHEC). The quarterly magazine, website, and e-newsletters address American Indian and Alaska Native higher education. It is a forum for tribal college administrators, faculty, staff, and students, providing discussion for their needs, successes, and evolving missions.

== History ==
The magazine was established in 1989 in Sacramento, California. AIHEC tribal college presidents resolved on November 14, 1989, to support the magazine and gave it editorial independence as opposed to a typical in-house publication. In the summer of 1991, Founding editor Paul Boyer moved operations to Chestertown, Maryland. In 1995, the magazine moved to Mancos, Colorado, and is now located in a building where Paula Gunn Allen used to reside.

Paul Boyer, author and education consultant, was the founding editor. Marjane Ambler, previously editor of High Country News in Lander, Wyoming, held the position for eleven years. Tina Deschenie, the first Native to hold the position, became the editor in June 2006.

== Publishing ==
Layout and design were created by Nakota Designs, a Lakota owned and operated advertising and design company.

== Awards ==
- Gold award, Best column, Society of National Association Publications (SNAP)
- Silver award, Cover photo illustration, SNAP
- 2nd place, General Excellence, Magazine category, Native American Journalists Association (NAJA)
