= Conference on Indians in the Americas =

The first United Nations Conference on Indians in the Americas was held in Geneva in 1977.

It was organised by Jimmie Durham, head of the International Indian Treaty Council, with Mapuche leaders exiled from Chile under Pinochet and supported by the American activist Roxanne Dunbar-Ortiz.

The lobbyists went on to set up a formal working group, but the United Nations widened its scope from the Americas to indigenous peoples of the world. The conference was therefore seen as the first UN conference on Indigenous Peoples.

After a further thirty years of campaigning, the United Nations General Assembly adopted the Declaration on the Rights of Indigenous Peoples on September 13, 2007. It was opposed only by the United States, Canada, Australia and New Zealand.
