= Simon J. Ortiz =

American writer

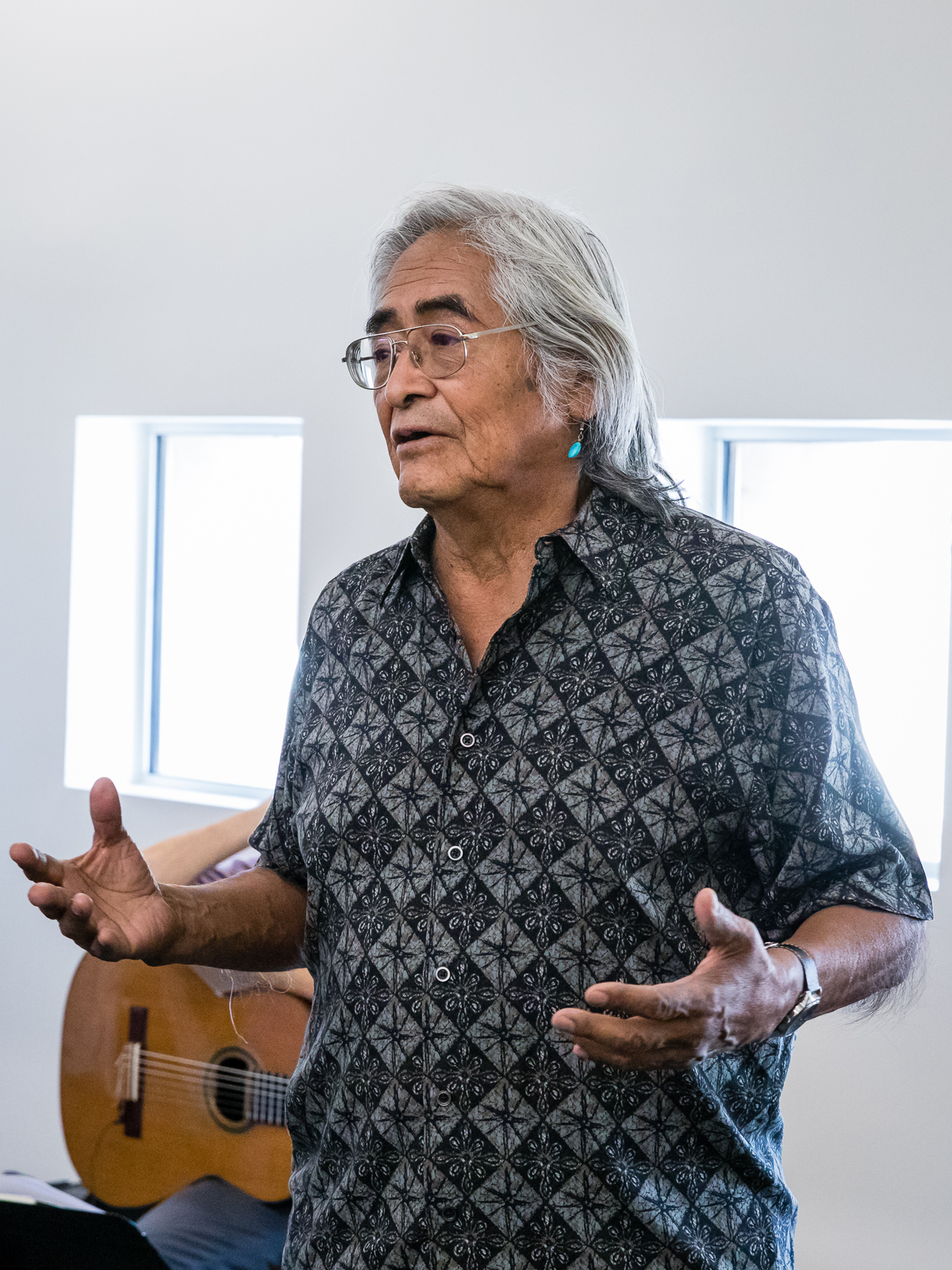
- Professor Ortiz at his retirement social
- Born: May 27, 1941 (age 85); Albuquerque, New Mexico, U.S.
- Occupations: Writer, educator, politician
- Spouse: Roxanne Dunbar-Ortiz
- Writing career
- Period: c. 1976–present
- Genres: Poetry, fiction
- Notable work: From Sand Creek: Rising In This Heart Which Is Our America
- Movement: Native American Renaissance

Simon J. Ortiz (born May 27, 1941) is a Native American writer, poet, and enrolled member of the Pueblo of Acoma. Ortiz is one of the key figures in the second wave of what has been called the Native American Renaissance.

Ortiz's commitment to preserving and expanding the literary and oral histories of the Acoma people accounts for many of the themes and techniques that compose his work. Ortiz identifies himself less as a "poet" than a "storyteller". The composition of a traditional Pueblo storyteller includes not only oral narrative materials, which adapt easily to short story or essay forms but also songs, chants, winter stories, sacred oral narratives associated with origin stories and their attendant ceremonies. Such materials when recited aloud, have a distinctly "poetic" texture.

== Background ==
Ortiz is a member of the Eagle Clan. He was raised in the Acoma village of McCartys (Keresan name: Deetzeyaamah), and spoke only Keresan at home. His father, a railroad worker and woodcarver, was an elder in the clan who was charged with keeping the religious knowledge and customs of the pueblo.

Ortiz attended McCartys Day School through the sixth grade, after which he was sent to St. Catherine's Indian School in Santa Fe, as many Native children were sent to Indian boarding schools at the time. Attempting to provide an English-language education, such boarding schools sought to assimilate Native American children into mainstream American culture and forbade them to speak their own Indigenous languages. Thus, the young Ortiz began to struggle with an acute awareness of the cultural dissonance shaping him and began to write about his experiences and thoughts in his diaries and compose short stories. While frustrated with his situation, he became a voracious reader and developed a passionate love of language, reading whatever he could get his hands on — including dictionaries, which he felt let his mind travel within a "state of wonder."

Homesick for his family and community, Ortiz became disillusioned with St. Catherine's. He transferred to Albuquerque Indian School, which taught trade classes such as plumbing and mechanics. He took both metal and woodworking classes, but his father was opposed to the prospect of his son's future being in manual labor. However, the day after graduating from Grants High School, in Grants, New Mexico (near Acoma), Ortiz began work as a laborer at the nearby Kerr-McGee uranium plant. Interested in becoming a chemist, he initially applied for a technical position. Instead, he was made a typist, soon demoted to being a crusher, and later promoted as a semi-skilled operator. His experience as a mining laborer would later inspire his work, "Fight Back: For the Sake of the People, for the Sake of the Land".

Ortiz eventually saved enough money to enroll in Fort Lewis College in Durango, Colorado, as a chemistry major with the help of a BIA educational grant. While enthralled with language and literature, the young Ortiz never considered pursuing writing seriously; at the time, it was not a career that seemed viable for Native people; it was "a profession only whites did."

== Literary career ==
After spending three years in the U.S. Armed Forces, Ortiz initiated his literary career when he began to attend the University of New Mexico in 1966 with the intent to study English Literature and creative writing. Ortiz soon discovered, through his studies, that few ethnic writers had entered the canon of American Literature. Due to his interest in the subject of ethnic writers, Ortiz discovered a new age of Native American authors arising during a renaissance of political activism. One of Ortiz's influences was Kiowa author, N. Scott Momaday. Momaday's novel House Made of Dawn (1968) expresses an original form of prose and innovative style that attracted a young Ortiz. The combination of both the political atmosphere surrounding Native cultures and the lack of ethnic authors integrated in the literary curriculum also caused Ortiz to alter his writing style from self-expression to a focus on unheard Native voices.

In 1968, Ortiz was offered a fellowship for writing at the University of Iowa in the International Writers Program.

Ortiz's first collection of poems, Going for the Rain, was published in 1976. His publication was inspired by the stories of Indigenous people across the country. Ortiz set out on a cross-country trip in 1970 to uncover original stories from the Native perspective. Ortiz has since furthered his literary career with a multitude of publications including poetry, short-stories, and books. From then on, Ortiz was considered one of the most respected and widely read Native American poets. Ortiz relates his style to the struggles of those living within the Southwest stemming from destructive Western expansionism, including the railroads his father worked on, land developers and uranium exploitation, which Ortiz himself worked within. These struggles and the exploitation of the land are inherent within Ortiz' poetry and his writing style as a whole.

In 1976, Ortiz enrolled in Evergreen State College's Independent Studies Program to conduct research regarding health hazards for people living near open-pit mines and mill-tailings ponds.

In 1988 Ortiz was appointed as tribal interpreter of the Acoma Pueblo. He also held a position as the consulting editor of the Pueblo of Acoma Press, in 1982.

== Academic career ==
Since 1968, Ortiz has taught creative writing and Native American literature at various institutions, including San Diego State, the Institute of American Indian Arts in Santa Fe, Navajo Community College, the College of Marin, the University of New Mexico, Sinte Gleska University, and the University of Toronto. He currently teaches at Arizona State University.

== Awards and honors ==
Ortiz is a recipient of the New Mexico Humanities Council Humanitarian Award, the National Endowment for the Arts Discovery Award, the Lila Wallace Reader's Digest Writer's Award, a National Endowment for the Arts Fellowship, and was an Honored Poet recognized at the 1981 White House Salute to Poetry.

In 1981, From Sand Creek: Rising In This Heart Which Is Our America, received the Pushcart Prize in poetry.

Ortiz received a Lifetime Achievement Award from the Returning the Gift Festival of Native Writers (the Wordcraft Circle of Native Writers and Storytellers) and the Native Writers' Circle of the Americas (1993).

== Works ==
- "My Father's Song" (poem; 1976 in Going for the Rain)
- "Speaking" (poem; 1977)
- A Good Journey (1977)
- The people shall continue (Fifth world tales) (1977)
- Howbah Indians: Stories (1978)
- Song, Poetry, and Language (1978)
- Fight Back: For the Sake of the People, For the Sake of the Land (1980)
- A Poem is a Journey (1981)
- From Sand Creek: Rising In This Heart Which Is Our America (1981)
- Changing the Routine: Selected Short Stories (1982)
- Blue and Red (1982)
- The Importance of Childhood (1982)
- This America (1983)
- A Good Journey (1984)
- Fightin': New and Collected Stories (1984)
- Always the Stories (1984)
- The Creative Press (1985)
- Earth Power Coming: Short Fiction in Native American Literature (1988)
- The People Shall Continue (1988)
- Woven Stone (selected works) (1992)
- After and Before the Lightning (1994)
- Center (1995)
- Speaking for the Generations: Native Writers on Writing, editor (1998)
- Men on the Moon: Collected Short Stories (1999)
- Out There Somewhere (2002)
- The Good Rainbow Road: Rawa Kashtyaa'tsi Hiyaani (A Native American Tale in Keres) (2004)
- Ortiz, Simon J. "What We See: A Perspective on Chaco Canyon and Pueblo Ancestry," Chaco Canyon: A Center and Its World. Museum of New Mexico Press, 1994.
- Light on Light (2023)

In anthology

- Ghost Fishing: An Eco-Justice Poetry Anthology (University of Georgia Press, 2018)

== See also ==
- List of writers from peoples indigenous to the Americas
- Native American Studies
