= Roxanne Dunbar-Ortiz =

American historian and activist (born 1938)

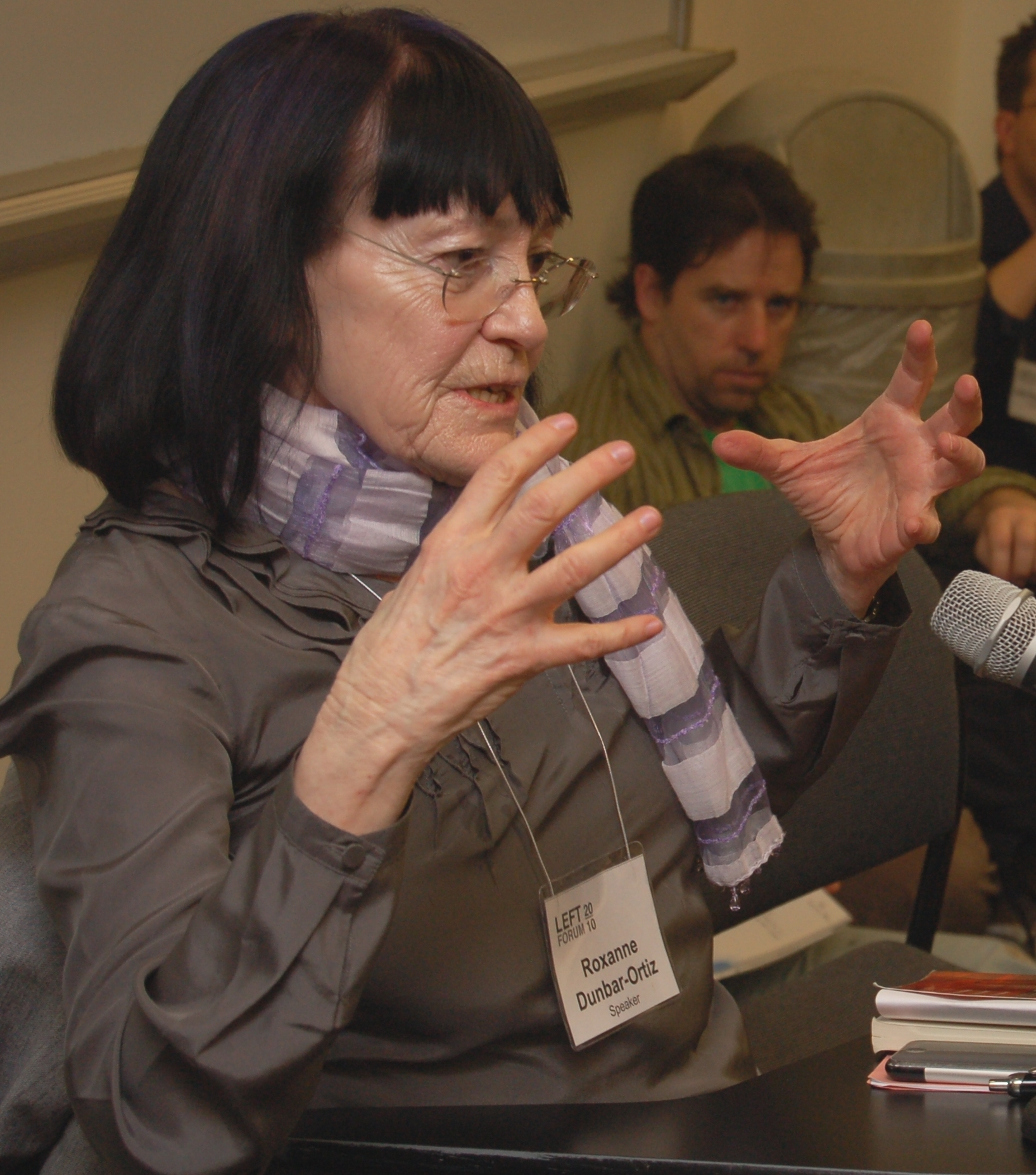
- Dunbar-Ortiz in 2010
- Born: September 10, 1938 (age 88); San Antonio, Texas, U.S.
- Education: San Francisco State University (BA); Mills College (MFA); University of California, Los Angeles (PhD)
- Occupations: Historian; activist
- Spouse: Simon J. Ortiz (third husband)
- Children: 1
- Writing career
- Subjects: Feminism; Native American rights
- Notable works: The Great Sioux Nation (1977); An Indigenous Peoples' History of the United States (2014); Loaded (2018)

Roxanne Dunbar-Ortiz (born September 10, 1938) is an American historian, writer, professor, and activist based in San Francisco. Born in Texas, she grew up in Oklahoma and is a social justice and feminist activist. She has written numerous books including, Red Dirt: Growing up Okie (1992), Blood on the Border: A Memoir of the Contra Years (2005), and An Indigenous Peoples' History of the United States (2014). She is professor emerita in ethnic studies at California State University.

== Early life and education ==
Born in San Antonio, Texas, in 1938 to an Oklahoma family, Roxanne Dunbar-Ortiz grew up in Central Oklahoma. Her father was a sharecropper of Scotch-Irish ancestry. Dunbar has written that her mother was of Cherokee descent and has said that her mother denied her Native ancestry after marrying into a white family. Because of her various claims of having Indigenous ancestry, Dunbar acknowledged that she has been "denounced as a fraud pretending to be Native American." In 2021, on C-SPAN2, she said: "I never had ties with anything. It’s pretty certain that probably my mother was not Cherokee. [...] There’s no tracing it. [...] I certainly would not call myself Cherokee."

Dunbar's paternal grandfather was a settler, landed farmer, veterinarian, labor activist, and member of the Socialist Party in Oklahoma and the Industrial Workers of the World. Her father, Moyer Haywood Pettibone Scarberry Dunbar, was named after a leader of the Industrial Workers of the World, Bill Haywood. Her father's stories of her grandfather inspired her to lifelong social justice activism. Her account of her life up to leaving Oklahoma is recorded in the book Red Dirt: Growing Up Okie.

Married at 18, Dunbar-Ortiz and her husband moved to San Francisco three years later, where she has lived most of her life since. This marriage later ended. She has a daughter. She later married writer Simon J. Ortiz (Acoma Pueblo).

Dunbar-Ortiz graduated from San Francisco State College in 1963, majoring in history. She began graduate study in the Department of History at the University of California, Berkeley, but transferred to the University of California, Los Angeles, completing her doctorate in history there in 1974. In addition to the doctorate, she completed a Diplôme of the International Law of Human Rights at the International Institute of Human Rights, Strasbourg, France, in 1983 and an MFA in creative writing at Mills College in 1993.

== Activism ==
From 1967 to 1974, she was a full-time activist living in various parts of the United States, traveling to Europe, Mexico, and Cuba. She was also involved in the women's liberation movement. Outlaw Woman: Memoir of the War Years outlines this time of her life, chronicling the years 1960–1975.

In 1968 she founded Cell 16, which was a feminist organization in the United States known for its program of celibacy, separation from men, and self-defense training (specifically karate); it has been cited as the first organization to advance the concept of separatist feminism.

She contributed the piece "Female Liberation as the Basis for Social Revolution" to the 1970 anthology Sisterhood is Powerful: An Anthology of Writings From The Women's Liberation Movement, edited by Robin Morgan.

In 1974, she accepted a position as assistant professor in the newly established Native American studies program at California State University at Hayward, where she helped develop the departments of ethnic studies and women's studies. In the wake of the Wounded Knee Siege of 1973, she became active in the American Indian Movement (AIM) and the International Indian Treaty Council, beginning a lifelong commitment to Indigenous peoples' right to self-determination and to international human rights.

She edited the book The Great Sioux Nation, which was published in 1977 and presented as the fundamental document at the first international conference on Indians of the Americas, held at United Nations' headquarters in Geneva, Switzerland. The book was issued in a new edition by University of Nebraska Press in 2013. The Great Sioux Nation was followed by two other books: Roots of Resistance: A History of Land Tenure in New Mexico (1980) and Indians of the Americas: Human Rights and Self-Determination (1984). She also edited two anthologies on Native American economic development while heading the Institute for Native American Development at the University of New Mexico.

In 1981, Dunbar-Ortiz was asked to visit Sandinista Nicaragua to appraise the land tenure situation of the Miskito people in Mosquitia. Her two trips there that year coincided with the beginning of United States government's sponsorship of a proxy war to overthrow the Sandinistas, with the northeastern region on the border with Honduras becoming a war zone and the basis for extensive propaganda carried out by the Reagan administration against the Sandinistas. In over a hundred trips to Nicaragua and Honduras from 1981 to 1989, she monitored what was called the Contra War. She tells of these years in Caught in the Crossfire: The Miskitu Indians of Nicaragua (1985) and Blood on the Border: A Memoir of the Contra War (2005).

In her work An Indigenous Peoples' History of the United States, Dunbar-Ortiz condemns the discovery doctrine and the settler colonialism that devastated Native American populations in the United States. She compares this form of religious bigotry to the modern-day conquests of al-Qaeda. She states that, since much of the current land within the United States was taken by aggression and oppression, "Native peoples have vast claims to reparations and restitution," yet "[n]o monetary amount can compensate for lands illegally seized, particularly those sacred lands necessary for Indigenous peoples to regain social coherence."

She is featured in the feminist history film She's Beautiful When She's Angry.

She is professor emeritus of ethnic studies at California State University, Hayward. Since retiring from university teaching, she has been lecturing widely and continues to write.

== Awards ==
The Lannan Foundation awarded Dunbar-Ortiz the 2017 Cultural Freedom Award.

== Selected works ==
=== As author ===
- Roots of Resistance: Land Tenure in New Mexico, 1680–1980. University of California, 1980. ISBN 9780895510501
  - University of Oklahoma Press, 2007. ISBN 9780806138336
- Indians of the Americas: Human Rights and Self-Determination. Zed Press; Praeger, 1984. ISBN 9780030009143
- La Cuestión Mískita en la Revolución Nicaragüense. Editorial Linea, 1986.
- The Miskito Indians of Nicaragua. Minority Rights Group, 1988. ISBN 9780946690596
- Red Dirt: Growing Up Okie. Verso, 1997. ISBN 978-1-85984-856-2
  - University of Oklahoma Press, 2006. ISBN 9780806137759
- Outlaw Woman: A Memoir of the War Years, 1960–75. City Light Books, 2002. ISBN 9780806144795
- Blood on the Border: Memoir of the Contra War. South End Press, 2005. ISBN 9780806153841
- An Indigenous Peoples' History of the United States. Beacon, 2014. ISBN 9780807057834
- "All the Real Indians Died Off” and 20 Other Myths about Native Americans. With Dina Gilio-Whitaker. Beacon, 2016. ISBN 978-0-8070-6265-4
- Loaded: A Disarming History of the Second Amendment. City Lights Books, 2018. ISBN 9780872867239
- Not "a Nation of Immigrants": Settler Colonialism, White Supremacy, and a History of Erasure and Exclusion. Beacon, 2021. ISBN 9780807036297

=== As editor ===
- The Great Sioux Nation: Sitting in Judgment on America. Random House, 1977. ISBN 978-0-394-42299-2
  - University of Nebraska Press, 2013. ISBN 9780803244832
- Economic Development in American Indian Reservations. University of New Mexico, 1979.
- Native American Energy Resources and Development. University of New Mexico, 1980. ISBN 9780934090025

== See also ==
- Cell 16
