= Paul Chaat Smith =

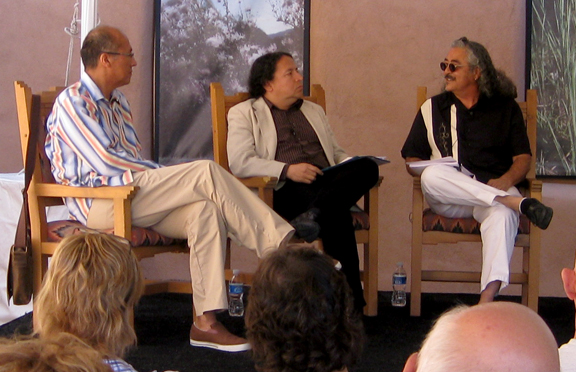
- Gerald McMaster (left), Paul Chaat Smith (center), and Joseph Sanchez (right) in a panel discussion, 2008
- Occupations: Author, curator
- Writing career
- Language: English
- Genre: Native American studies
- Website: paulchaatsmith.com

Paul Chaat Smith (Comanche) is an author and an associate curator at the National Museum of the American Indian. He writes and lectures frequently on American Indian art and politics.

== Early life ==
Paul Smith was born in Texas, the son of Clodus and Pauline Rosalee (Chaat) Smith. His mother Pauline Rosalee (née Chaat) (1928–2017) was Comanche. His father Clodus R. Smith is Choctaw, and has served as president of several colleges. Paul's grandfather was Rev. Dr. Robert Paul Chaat, Sr., President of the National Fellowship of Indian Workers.

After Texas, the family moved to Ithaca, New York. In 1959 they moved to Maryland and next to Cleveland, Ohio. Paul's parents were both dedicated to education. They created the Clodus and Pauline (Chaat) Smith American Indian Scholarship at Cameron University in Lawton, Oklahoma.

== Career ==
=== Curatorial practice ===
Smith has been an associate curator for the National Museum of the American Indian since 2001. In 2004, he was responsible for setting up the museum's permanent history gallery. He curated the ten-year exhibit Americans that opened in 2017.

In 2005, Smith worked with fellow curator Truman Lowe (Ho-Chunk) to sponsor and produce an exhibition by performance and installation artist James Luna at the 51st Venice Biennale, which included a performance dedicated to Pablo Tac.

In 2008 and 2009, he organized a major retrospective for Fritz Scholder, called Fritz Scholder: Indian/Not Indian.

In 2009 and 2010, Smith produced a show for Canadian artist Brian Jungen, called Strange Comfort.

Smith has worked to promote the work of many other Native American and Aboriginal Canadian artists, including Richard Ray Whitman, Faye HeavyShield, and Kent Monkman.

=== Writing ===
Smith is the author, with Robert Allen Warrior (Osage), of Like a Hurricane: The Indian Movement from Alcatraz to Wounded Knee (1996). This account of American Indian activism "has already become a classic and essential interpretive work". The book focuses on three pivotal events in Native American activism, the 1969 Occupation of Alcatraz, the 1972 Trail of Broken Treaties to Washington, DC, and subsequent takeover of the Department of Interior headquarters, when the Bureau of Indian Affairs (BIA) offices were occupied; and the 1973 Wounded Knee Occupation at Pine Ridge Reservation.

He put together his humorous but informative book, Everything You Know about Indians Is Wrong (2009), over 16 years. The book is described by its publisher, University of Minnesota Press, as essays that combine "memoir and commentary."

In 2025, Smith was awarded a Rabkin Prize for his work as a writer and curator from the Dorothea and Leo Rabkin Foundation.

=== Other work ===
Smith has lectured at such institutions as the National Gallery of Art in Washington, DC and the Getty Center in Los Angeles. He served as an academic advisor for the PBS series, We Shall Remain, Episode 5: Wounded Knee.

== Personal ==
Paul Chaat Smith's sister, Marti Chaatsmith (Comanche-Choctaw), is the associate director of the Newark Earthworks Center at Ohio State University, Newark. She is dedicated to preserving Ohio's pre-Columbian earthworks constructed by ancient Native Americans.

== Publications ==
- Everything You Know about Indians Is Wrong (University of Minnesota Press, 2009) ISBN 978-0-8166-5601-1.
- With Robert Allen Warrior, Like a Hurricane: The Indian Movement from Alcatraz to Wounded Knee (The New Press, 1997) ISBN 978-1-56584-402-5.
