= International Indian Treaty Council =

US-based non-profit organization

- Founded: 1974 in Standing Rock, South Dakota
- Type: NGO with Consultative Status to the United Nations Economic and Social Council
- Location(s): San Francisco, California; Tucson, Arizona; Palmer, Alaska (United States)
- Services: Responding to threats and violations of Indigenous Peoples' rights
- Methods: Communications, Outreach, Networking, and Alliance building
- Executive Director: Andrea Carmen
- Website: www.iitc.org

The International Indian Treaty Council (IITC) is an organization of Indigenous peoples from North, Central, South America, the Caribbean and the Pacific working for the sovereignty and self-determination of Indigenous peoples and the recognition and protection of Indigenous rights, treaties, traditional cultures and sacred lands.

== History ==
The IITC was formed at a gathering on the land of the Standing Rock Sioux Tribe, in South Dakota, June 8–16, 1974. This gathering would later be known as the First International Indian Treaty Conference. This gathering, and the IITC which resulted from it, was called for by the American Indian Movement, and was attended by delegates from 97 Indian tribes and Nations from across North and South America.

IITC held the Second International Treaty Conference on the land of the Yanktonai Dakota people in Greenwood, South Dakota, in June 16–20, 1976.

In 1976, Aboriginal Australian activist and poet Lionel Fogarty addressed a meeting of the IITC.

Organized by IITC in 1977, the International NGO Conference on Discrimination against Indigenous Populations in the Americas was held from September 20 to 23, 1977, in the Palais des Nations, Geneva, Switzerland. The conference is also referred to as the United Nations Conference on Indians in the Americas.

Since 1977, the IITC has been recognized by the United Nations as a category II Non-governmental Organization (NGO) with Consultative Status with the UN Economic and Social Council, making it the second indigenous NGO to gain such status. The first was Canada's Native Indian Brotherhood, who achieved that status in 1974, on the understanding that it would transfer that status to a more international organization once one was established. That organization was the World Council of Indigenous Peoples, which was formed in Canada in 1975 with George Manuel as its first leader.

== Objectives ==
The IITC's work includes supporting grassroots Indigenous struggles for human rights, self-determination and environmental justice through information dissemination, networking, coalition building, advocacy and technical assistance. The IITC aims to build, organize and facilitate the participation of Indigenous Peoples in local, regional, national and international events and gatherings addressing their concerns and survival. Working largely with international bodies, the IITC focuses on building Indigenous Peoples' participation in key United Nations fora such as the Commission on Human Rights, the Working Group on Indigenous Populations, the Sub-Commission on Prevention of Discrimination and Protection of Minorities, the Conference of the Parties to the Convention on Biological Diversity, UNESCO and the Commission on Sustainable Development. In recent years, IITC has also participated in the International Labour Organization, UN World Conferences, the International Union for the Conservation of Nature and the World Archeological Congress to systematically address concerns vital to Indigenous Peoples.

The IITC cite their objectives as the following:

- To seek, promote and build participation of Indigenous Peoples in the United Nations (UN) and its specialized agencies, as well as other international forums.
- To seek international recognition for Treaties and Agreements between Indigenous Peoples and Nation-States.
- To support the human rights, self-determination and sovereignty of Indigenous Peoples; to oppose colonialism in all its forms, and its effects upon Indigenous Peoples.
- To build solidarity and relationships of mutual support among Indigenous Peoples of the world.
- To disseminate information about Indigenous Peoples' human rights issues, struggles, concerns and perspectives.
- To establish and maintain one or more organizational offices to carry out IITC's information dissemination, networking and human rights programs.

The IITC also disseminates information about opportunities for international activism and involvement in grassroots Indigenous communities and tribes, and educates and builds awareness about Indigenous struggles among non-Indigenous Peoples and organizations. With the aim of facilitating indigenous participation in struggles for indigenous justice at the UN level, the IITC published a guide outlining how to write a shadow report.

== Declaration for the Rights of Indigenous Peoples ==
The IITC was a major player in the process of drafting of the Declaration on the Rights of Indigenous Peoples (passed in 2007), and working towards its adoption by the United Nations. In 2004, during the 10th session of the Intersessional Working Group on the Draft Declaration on the Rights of Indigenous Peoples, the IITC helped to coordinate and carry out a hunger strike, protesting for the rights of indigenous peoples threatened by loss of land, environmental racism, toxic dumping, globalization and theft of mineral and water rights.

== The Indigenous Peoples Sunrise Ceremony ==
Since 1981 IITC has organized the Indigenous Peoples' Sunrise Ceremony, an annual gathering held on the island of Alcatraz in San Francisco Bay, in the United States of America. Originally organized by AIM for Freedom Survival Group in 1979, IITC began hosting it after the SF Information Office was reopened by AIM for Freedom Survival Group in April of 1981. Observed on the United States Thanksgiving holiday in November, this Unthanksgiving gathering and ceremony is held to recognize the inherent, distinct and collective rights of Indigenous Peoples and in honor the feast, held on Thanksgiving Day, on Alcatraz Island in 1969 during the Occupation of Alcatraz.

== Treaty Council News ==
In 1977, the IITC began compiling and publishing the bulletin Treaty Council News. This periodical was one of the original Indigenous news publications in the United States. The IITC continues the publication of this bulletin in electronic format, via the IITC website.

== Notable people ==
The International Indian Treaty Council was founded in 1974 by Bill Means (Oglala Lakota). People who have been involved with the IITC over time include Jimmie Durham, Paul Chaat Smith (Comanche/Choctaw), Roxanne Dunbar-Ortiz, Bill Wahpepah (Sac and Fox), Hinewirangi Kohu Morgan (Māori), Bumpy Kanahele (Native Hawaiian), and Executive Director Andrea Carmen (Yaqui descent).
