= Diné College Press =

Publishing division of Diné College

Diné College Press (formerly Navajo Community College Press) is the publishing division of Diné College, headquartered in Tsaile, Arizona, but whose territory spans throughout the Navajo Nation. Diné College Press has published books by and pertaining to Native Americans. While most titles focus on the issues of the Navajo people, others have dealt with broader issues pertaining to Native American studies. Authors include Acoma Pueblo poet and author Simon J. Ortiz and Pawnee-Otoe-Missouria author Anna Lee Walters.

== Published works ==
Titles published by the Diné College Press include the following.

- Ruth Roessel. Illustrated by Raymond Johnson and Jason Chee. Navajo studies at Navajo Community College. (1971). ISBN 0912586133.
- Ethelou Yazzie, ed. Andy Tsihnahjinnie, illustrator. Martin Hoffman, photography. Navajo history. (1971). ISBN 0912586117
- Ruth Roessel, ed. Navajo stories of the long walk period. (1973). ISBN 0912586168.
- Ruth Roessel and Broderick H. Johnson. Navajo Livestock Reduction: a national disgrace. (1974). ISBN 0912586184.
- Ruth Roessel. The role of Indian studies in American education. (1974). ISBN 0912586206.
- Robert A. Roessel. elect Navajo historical occurrences, 1850-1923. (1974). ISBN 0912586192.
- Hildegard Thompson. The Navajos' long walk for education: a history of Navajo education = Diné Nizaagóó liná bíhoo'aah yíkánaaskai: Diné óhoot' aahii baa hane'. (1975).
- Prepared by participants in an Institute on American Indian Culture, conducted at Navajo Community College: Summer 1970. Our friends, the Navajos: a select collection of studies. (1976). ISBN 0912586222.
- Authored by 22 Navajo men and women; Broderick H. Johnson, ed.; illustrators, Raymond Johnson and Hoke Denetsosie. Stories of traditional Navajo life and culture = Alk\id ̨á ̨á\ y ̨é ̨ék\ehgo Diné Kéédahat\in ̨é ̨é Baa Nahane. (1977). ISBN 0912586230.
- Peggy V. Beck. The Cheyenne. (1977). ISBN 091258632X.
- Peggy V. Beck, Anna Lee Walters, Nia Francisco The sacred: ways of knowledge, sources of life. (1977). ISBN 0912586745.
- Keats Begay. Navajos and World War II. (1977). ISBN 0912586362.
- Linda Goodman. Music and dance in Northwest Coast Indian life. (1977). ISBN 0912586281
- J. Richard Haefer. Papago music and dance. (1977). ISBN 091258629X.
- Simon Ortiz. Song, poetry and language-expression and perception. (1977). ISBN 0912586303.
- Robert Rhodes. Hopi music and dance. (1977). ISBN 0912586273.
- Robert W. Young. A political history of the Navajo tribe. (1978). ISBN 0912586370.
- Simon J. Ortiz, ed. Earth power coming: short fiction in native American literature. (1983). ISBN 0912586508. ISBN 0912586532.
- Frank D. Reeve; edited by Eleanor Adams and John Kessell. Navaho foreign affairs, 1795-1846. (1983). ISBN 0912586516.
- K. D. Williamson, Jr. Navajo energy resources. (1983). ISBN 0912586540.
- Donald Levering; photographs by Gregg D. Baker and Leonard Gorman. Outcroppings from Navajoland: poems. (1984). ISBN 0912586524
- James A. Mischke. Circles, consciousness and culture. (1984). ISBN 0912586575.
- Floyd Allen Pollock. A Navajo confrontation and crisis. (1984). ISBN 0-912586567 and ISBN 0-912586559.
- David M. Brugge. Navajos in the Catholic Church records of New Mexico, 1694-1875. (1985). ISBN 0912586591.
- Sam Bingham, Janet Bingham; illustrated by Hank Willie. Navajo Chapters. (1987). ISBN 091258663X.
- J. Loring Haskell. Southern Athapaskan migration, A. D. 200-1750. (1987). ISBN 0912586605.
- David E. Wilkins. Diné bibeehaz'áanii: a handbook of Navajo government. (1987). ISBN 0912586648.
- Recorded by Mary C. Wheelwright; edited with commentaries by David P. McAllester; foreword by Rain Parrish; with 22 color plates after sandpaintings recorded by Franc J. Newcomb and others; illustrated by Jason Chee. The myth and prayers of the Great Star chant and the myth of the Coyote chant. (1988). ISBN 0912586613. ISBN 0912586583.
- Martha Blue. The Witch purge of 1878: Oral and documentary history in the early Navajo reservation years. (1988). ISBN 0912586664
- Klara B. Kelley and Peter M. Whiteley. Navajoland: family settlement and land use. (1989). ISBN 0912586656
- Vernon O. Mayes and Barbara Bayless Lacy; with illustrations by Jack Ahasteen and Jason Chee. Naniseʹ: a Navajo herbal: one hundred plants from the Navajo Reservation. (1989). ISBN 0912586621.
- Norman T. Oppelt. The tribally controlled Indian colleges: the beginnings of self determination in American Indian education. (1990). ISBN 0912586672.
- Diné Center for Human Development. The Navajo dictionary on diagnostic terminology: a reference guide on Navajo usage of diagnostic terms. (1991). ISBN 0912586680.
- Marilyne Virginia Mabery. Right after sundown: teaching stories of the Navajos. (1991). ISBN 0912586699.
- Troxey Kemper. Comanche warbonnet: a story of Quanah Parker. (1991). ISBN 0912586710.
- Jimmy H. Miller. The life of Harold Sellers Colton: a Philadelphia Brahmin in Flagstaff. (1991). ISBN 0912586702.
- Della Frank and Roberta D. Joe; illustrator David Chethlahe Paladin. Storm pattern: poems from two Navajo women. (1993). ISBN 0912586753.
- Marie Lewis; David Nez. Tsʹ̕iliiyʹazhʹi Spuds baa hane ̕. (The story of a dog named Spuds.) (1993). ISBN 0912586788.
- Howard Meredith. Modern American Indian tribal government and politics. (1993). ISBN 0912586761.
- Ralph Salisbury. One Indian and two chiefs: short fiction. (1993). ISBN 0912586737.
- Roman de los Santos; illustrated by Raymond J. Johnson. The English-Navajo children's picture dictionary: selected words and phrases. (1995). ISBN 0912586729.
