= K. Tsianina Lomawaima =

American interdisciplinary researcher

- Born: 1955 (age 70–71)
- Citizenship: American
- Education: DePauw University; University of Arizona; Stanford University
- Awards: Member, AAAS; Member, NAE; Lifetime Achievement Award for American Indian History, Western History Association
- Scientific career
- Fields: Indigenous Studies; Anthropology; History; Political science
- Workplaces: University of Washington; University of Arizona; Arizona State University

K. Tsianina Lomawaima (born 1955) is an American interdisciplinary researcher of Indigenous studies, anthropology, history, and political science. She was a professor in the School of Social Transformation at Arizona State University until her retirement in 2021. She specializes in the interaction between sovereign Native nations and U.S. federalism, the status of Native people as U.S. citizens, and federal Indian policy particularly in the area of education. Her historical focus is the early 20th century.

== Early life ==
Kimberly Tsianina Carr was born in 1955. She married Hartman H. Lomawaima (Hopi, 1949–2008) in 1980. She is the great-niece of Tsianina Redfeather Blackstone.

== Education and positions ==
From 1972 to 1974, Lomawaima studied art and pre-medical studies at DePauw University. In 1976 she obtained a B.A. degree in anthropology at the University of Arizona, followed by an M.A. in anthropology at Stanford University in 1979. She continued to study anthropology at Stanford University, earning a PhD in 1987. Her PhD dissertation was called They Called it Prairie Light: Oral Histories from Chilocco Indian Agricultural School 1920–1940.

In 1988, Lomawaima joined the faculties of Anthropology and American Indian studies at the University of Washington. From 1994 to 2014, she was a professor in the department of American Indian studies at the University of Arizona, and she was the head of that department from 2005 until 2009. She moved to Arizona State University in 2014 where she worked until her retirement in 2021.

== Research ==
In 1994, Lomawaima published the book They Called it Prairie Light: The Story of Chilocco Indian School. In They Called it Prairie Light, Lomawaima studies the history of the residential school in Chilocco, Oklahoma, where her father, Curtis Carr, had been a student. She constructs her analysis using 61 interviews with former students and staff members regarding experiences they had at the school in the 1920s and 1930s. She also incorporates government documents, school documents, and secondary sources, but the book is primarily an oral history. Using these sources, Lomawaima discusses the history of the school, analyzing personal relationships that existed there, the strictly gendered nature of the education that female students received, and the way that students were disciplined. Lomawaima focuses on the impact that the school had on students' identities. Although the militaristic and abusive residential school system was designed to eradicate the students' tribal identities, combining students from so many different tribes there ironically had the effect of fostering pan-Native solidarity, and many former pupils of the school actually described the vocational training and community aspects of the school with fondness. Lomawaima argues that the fond memories that students have for the school are really fond memories for the tight community that the school environment fostered among its students; for example, Lomawaima argues that one ironic legacy of residential schooling was that the severe lack of funding meant that many older students had to take on responsibility for ensuring that younger students were cared for, causing them to form tight social groups with mutual responsibility. Lomawaima also provides extensive evidence that female pupils were particularly surveilled, with school officials constantly enforcing highly regimented rules about the bodies and behavior of girls who went to school at Chilocco. Because of all of these complexities, They Called it Prairie Light was described in reviews as a highly nuanced book, with Lomawaima permitting messy facts to coexist in the volume, facilitated by her goal of allowing the 61 interviewees to be the primary voice in their stories. They Called it Prairie Light received the 1993 North American Indian Prose Award, as well as the 1995 Critics' Choice Award from the American Educational Association.

Lomawaima has also coauthored multiple books. In 2000, she published Away From Home: American Indian Boarding School Experiences with Margaret Archuleta and Brenda Child. In 2001, she and David E. Wilkins published Uneven Ground: American Indian Sovereignty and Federal Law. Uneven Ground was selected as an Outstanding Academic Title by Choice Reviews, and was included on a list of the 10 most influential books by the Native American and Indigenous Studies Association. In 2006, she and Teresa L. McCarty wrote the book "To Remain an Indian": Lessons in Democracy from a Century of Native American Education.

In 2007 Lomawaima co-founded the Native American and Indigenous Studies Association, and she served as its president in 2012–2013. Lomawaima was the 2010 recipient of the Lifetime Achievement Award for American Indian History from the Western History Association. In 2016, she was named a member of the National Academy of Education. In 2018 Lomawaima became a member of the American Academy of Arts and Sciences.

== Selected bibliography ==
- They Called It Prairie Light: The Story of Chilocco Indian School (1994)
- "Tribal Sovereigns: Reframing Research in American Indian Education", Harvard Educational Review (2000)
- Away From Home: American Indian Boarding School Experiences, with Margaret Archuleta and Brenda Child (2000)
- Uneven Ground: American Indian Sovereignty and Federal Law, with David E. Wilkins (2001)
- "To Remain an Indian": Lessons in Democracy from a Century of Native American Education, with Teresa L. McCarty (2006)

== Selected awards ==
- Lifetime Achievement Award for American Indian History, Western History Association (2010)
- Member, National Academy of Education (2016)
- Member, American Academy of Arts and Sciences (2018)
