= Hartman H. Lomawaima =

Hopi museum director

Hartman H. Lomawaima (November 11, 1949 – July 8, 2008) was a Hopi museum director. He served as the fifth director of the Arizona State Museum, and was the first Native American to hold the position. He also was the first Native American to hold a position as director of a state agency in Arizona, and was on the board of trustees for the Smithsonian's National Museum of the American Indian in Washington, D.C.

Lomawaima was a Hopi born in the village of Supawlavi on Second Mesa, Arizona. He graduated from Northern Arizona University, and did his graduate work at Harvard University. Lomawaima first job was as a senior administrative officer at the Hearst Museum of Anthropology, University of California at Berkeley. He and his wife, Tsianina Lomawaima, subsequently moved to the University of Washington, where he taught.

In 1984, Lomawaima became the associate director at the Arizona State Museum, and professor of American Indian studies at the University of Arizona. He was appointed interim director of the museum in 2002 upon the resignation of the previous director and became the permanent director in 2004.
