= Clifford M. Lytle =

Political scientist

- Born: May 11, 1932; Youngstown, Ohio
- Died: October 9, 2014 (aged 82); Tucson, Arizona
- Education: Cleveland Heights, Ohio; Case Western Reserve University School of Law; University of Pittsburgh
- Scientific career
- Fields: Political science; Native American studies; Legal studies
- Workplaces: University of Arizona

Clifford M. Lytle (May 11, 1932 – October 9, 2014) was a political scientist, scholar of Native American studies, and legal scholar. He was a distinguished university professor in the department of political science at the University of Arizona. He frequently collaborated with fellow University of Arizona political science professor Vine Deloria Jr.

== Early life and education ==
Lytle was born on May 11, 1932, in Youngstown, Ohio, and he grew up in Cleveland Heights, Ohio. In 1962, he moved to Tucson, Arizona. He then attended Denison University and obtained a B.A. degree, followed by an LL.B. from Case Western Reserve University School of Law, and then a Ph.D. from the University of Pittsburgh.

== Career ==
After completing his PhD, Lytle joined the faculty at the University of Arizona, where he ultimately became a distinguished university professor. He also served as the head of the department of political science, and as the interim dean of students. During his time as a professor, Lytle wrote several books, two of them coauthored with Vine Deloria Jr.

In 1968, Lytle published the book The Warren Court & Its Critics. In 1983, Lytle and Deloria published American Indians, American Justice. The book details the historical legal relationship between the government of the United States and sovereign tribal nations, tracing the development of the large and often contradictory body of law that consists of overlapping tribal, state, and federal legal systems. They contrast the traditional focuses of these two systems, characterizing tribal courts as historically emphasizing conciliation and restitution whereas American justice seeks to determine guilt and exact retribution. They also discuss the role of legal interest groups which have sought to secure rights for indigenous people in the United States, seeking to underscore that those who are under both tribal jurisdiction and American jurisdiction are entitled to the full rights and privileges of any American citizen.

In 1998, Lytle coauthored another book with Vine Deloria, called The Nations Within: The Past and Future of American Indian Sovereignty. The book discusses tribal decision-making in the context of a highly complicated federalist system, in which tribes are conditionally afforded the rights of self-governance by the American federal government. Lytle and Deloria chronicle the history of the relevant federal laws and policies, and make suggestions for ways to restructure the federalist system and tribal governance to produce better results.

Lytle and Deloria had planned to write a third book, but they weren't able to complete it. That third project was eventually completed in 2013 by Deloria's student David E. Wilkins, in the form of Wilkins's book Hollow Justice: A History of Indigenous Claims in the United States.

== Selected works ==
- "The history of the civil rights bill of 1964", The Journal of Negro History, (1966)
- The Warren Court & Its Critics (1968)
- The Supreme Court, Tribal Sovereignty, and Continuing Problems of State Encroachment into Indian Country, American Indian Law Review (1980)
- American Indians, American Justice, with Vine Deloria Jr. (1983)
- The Nations Within: The Past and Future of American Indian Sovereignty, with Vine Deloria Jr. (1998)
