= David M. Brugge =

American linguist

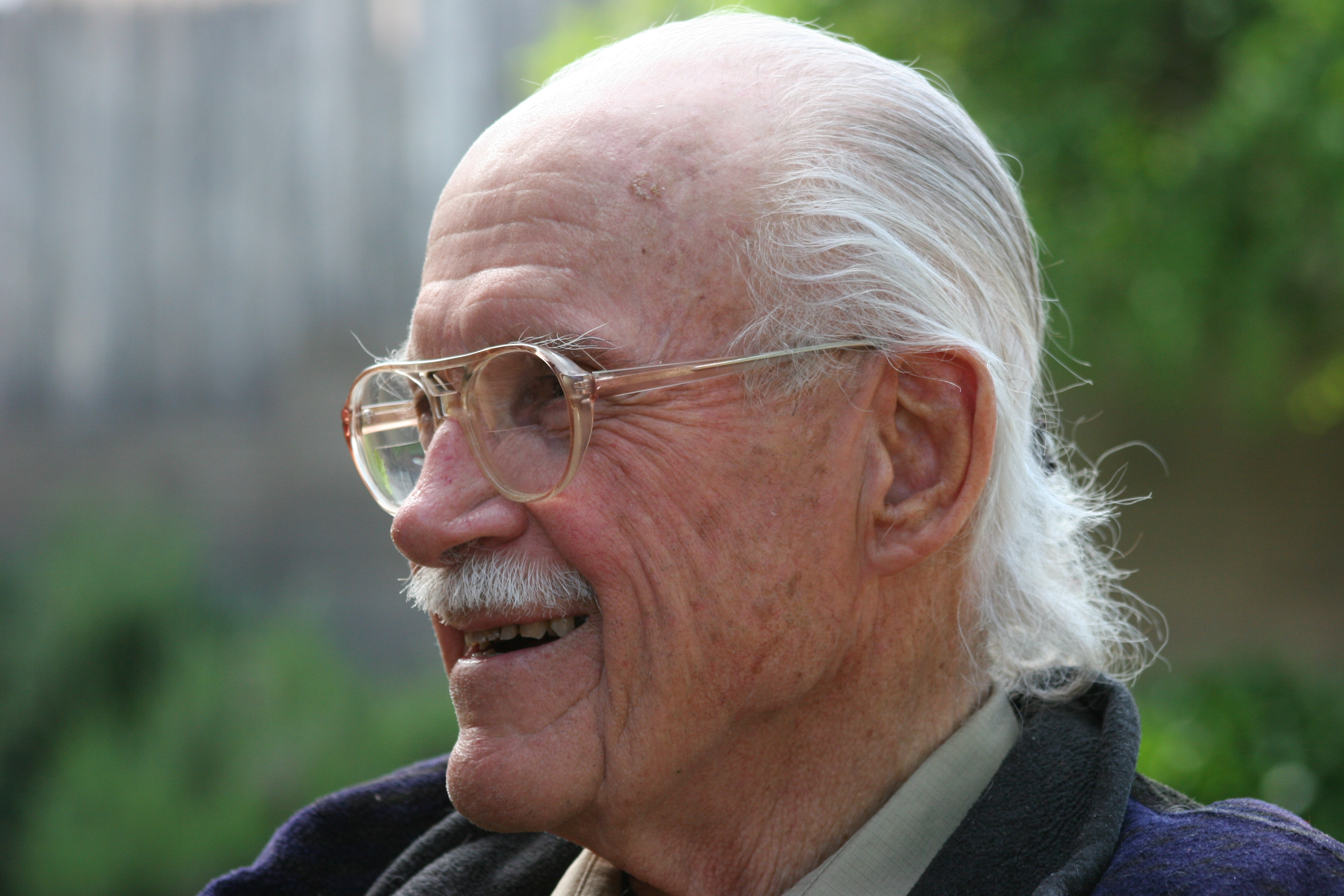
- Born: September 3, 1927; Jamestown, New York
- Died: March 15, 2013 (aged 85); New Mexico
- Education: University of New Mexico (B.A., 1950), University of New Mexico (Honorary Ph.D., 2005)
- Known for: Athabaskans of the Southwest, Navajo and Southwestern History, Navajo Ethnology, Navajo Archeology
- Spouse: Ruth (Sherlog) Brugge
- Children: Doug Brugge, Steve Brugge, Janet Brugge
- Scientific career
- Fields: Anthropology, Native American studies,
- Workplaces: University of New Mexico,

David Martin Brugge (1927 – 2013) was a cultural anthropologist, ethnohistorian, linguist, archaeologist and noted for his knowledge about the Navajo. Brugge published many papers and is often cited in works about the Navajo, Athapaskan or early Southwestern history.

Brugge conducted anthropological and ethnohistorical research for the Navajo Nation. He spent 20 years with the National Park Service, as Curator of the Hubbell Trading Post National Historic Site in Ganado, Arizona, archaeologist at the Chaco Center in Albuquerque, and Regional Curator for the Southwest Regional Office of the National Park Service at Santa Fe. After retirement, he co-founded the [Navajo Studies Conference] with Charlotte Frisbie in 1986. He remained active in research and helping others until his death.

== Early life ==
Brugge was one of two children born to Oswald and Francis Brugge and raised in Jamestown, New York. Brugge's passion for research started when his third grade teacher told him there were many ruins in Mexico and people knew nothing about them. Upon graduating from high school in 1945, he was drafted and served two years in the Army. Brugge used the G.I. and attended the University of New Mexico. After 4 years, he earned a BA in anthropology (1950).

Following graduation, he was involved in seasonal ranger work, archaeological surveys, and excavations, and establishing with a friend the Ayani Trading Company. Dave moved to Gallup, where he drove trucks for the Gallup Field Office delivering food for the Navajo Commodity Program. In 1953, he worked for the new Unitarian Service Committee's Gallup Indian Community Center. At the center, he met Ruth Sherlog and they married in 1959.

== Employed by Navajo ==
In 1958, he was hired by the Tribal Research Section of the Navajo Tribe, where he assembled documentation for the Navajo Tribe's case before the U.S. Land Claims Commission. He researched the Navajo claim to their traditional lands by using anthropology, Navajo oral tradition, written sources and archaeology research. Along with Lee J. Correll, Editha L. Watson and others, Brugge assembled a comprehensive Navajo bibliography published by the Navajo Tribe. He conducted extensive research to document every mention of Navajo in the Catholic Church Records of New Mexico between 1694 and 1875. This is a primary document for studies about Indian slavery in the Southwest.

Brugge did extensive research about early Navajo sites, oral tradition and written records for the Navajo-Hopi Land Settlement Act. Brugge was unhappy with the outcome and wrote "The Navajo-Hopi Land Dispute: An American Tragedy" in 1994.

== Employed by National Parks ==
Brugge worked for the National Park Service in 1953 as a seasonal ranger at El Morro National Monument. In 1968 he began his full-time career in the Park Service as Curator for the Navajo Lands Group. He was the first curator of the Hubbell Trading Post National Historic Site (five years).

He moved back to Albuquerque and was an anthropologist at the Chaco Center. He wrote "A History of the Chaco Navajo". In 1977 he was the Southwest Regional Curator for the National Park Service. He retired in 1988.

== Selected works ==
- Navajos in the Catholic Church Records of New Mexico 1694 - 1875
- The Navajo-Hopi Land Dispute: An American Tragedy
- Hubbell Trading Post National Historic Site
- A History of the Chaco Navajos
- Navajo Pottery and Ethnohistory
- Navajo Bibliography: With Subject Index, Research Report no. 2
