= Navajo Braille =

Braille alphabet of the Navajo language

- Script type: alphabet
- Print basis: Navajo alphabet
- Languages: Navajo

Related scripts
- Parent systems: Braille: English Braille; Navajo Braille

Navajo Braille is the braille alphabet of the Navajo language. It uses a subset of the letters of Unified English Braille, along with the punctuation and formatting of that standard. There are no contractions.

Additional letters, beyond those of English braille, are ⠹ for ł, ⠄ for ' (glottal stop and ejective consonants), the French vowels with grave accents for the Navajo vowels with acute accents (high tone), and ⠨ for ogonek on the following vowel (nasal vowels, e.g. ⠨⠁ for ą, ⠨⠷ for ą́). ⠋ is only used for the digit 6, as the letter 'f' does not exist in the Navajo alphabet.

In numerical order by decade, the letters are:

| a, 1 | b, 2 | c, 3 | d, 4 | e, 5 | 6 | g, 7 | h, 8 | i, 9 | j, 0 |
| k | l | m | n | o | s | t | x | y | z |
| á | é | ł | w | í | ó | ' | ogonek | | |

The alphabet was created by Carol Begay Green and adopted by the Navajo Nation in 2015.
