= William Morgan (Navajo scholar) =

Navajo linguist (1917–2001)

William Morgan (May 15, 1917 – January 6, 2001) was a Navajo linguist and translator. He is best known for his work with Robert W. Young, who he collaborated with on a series of books that documented the Navajo language. He also coauthored several other books about Navajo language, culture, and history with Leon Wall and Edward Mays. He and Young started the publication of Ádahooníłígíí, a bilingual Navajo-English newspaper. He received an honorary degree from the University of New Mexico.

== Early life and education ==
William Morgan was born on May 15, 1917, in a hogan outside of Gallup, New Mexico, into the Tsi’naajinii (transl. Black Streak Wood People) clan. In his early years, he attended a boarding school in Tohatchie, Arizona, run by the Bureau of Indian Affairs. He graduated from Fort Wingate High School in 1936.

== Career ==
After graduating high school, Morgan got a job at the Southwest Sheep Breeding Laboratory. Here, in the fall of 1937, he met Robert Young, a fellow employee with an interest in the Navajo language. The two worked to document the intricacies of the Navajo language. At the time, Morgan lived near the laboratory with his wife and children. Morgan joined the BIA as a language specialist in 1940. With Young, he published a collection of works relating to Navajo language and history. Among these, they published four dictionaries and related works. The first two were for non-natives that wanted to gain a basic understanding of the language and Navajo that wanted to learn English. The second two were more complex, including example sentences and verb conjugations. They also created several primers that were taught in BIA schools. Young and Morgan's work was interrupted during World War II, when Young served in the military. From 1956 to 1962, he was part of the Navajo-Cornell Field Health Research Project as a translator and consultant. With Young, he published Ádahooníłígíí (transl. Current events), which ran during the 1940s and 1950s. In 1970, the University of New Mexico presented him with an honorary Doctor of Letters degree.

== Death ==
Morgan died on January 6, 2001, from complications related to diabetes.

== Selected bibliography ==
- The Navaho Language: The Elements of Navaho Grammar with a Dictionary in Two Parts Containing Basic Vocabularies of Navaho and English (Young and Morgan, 1943)
- The ABC of Navaho (Young and Morgan, 1946)
- A Vocabulary of Colloquial Navaho (Young and Morgan, 1951)
- Talking Navajo before You Know It (Mays and Morgan, 1957)
- Navajo-English Dictionary (Wall and Morgan, 1958)
- The Navaho Language: A Grammar and Colloquial Dictionary (Young and Morgan, 1980)
- Analytical Lexicon of Navaho (Young and Morgan, 1992)
- Navajo-English Dictionary (Wall and Morgan, 1994)
