= Robert W. Young =

American linguist (1912–2007)

Robert W. Young (May 18, 1912 – February 20, 2007), professor emeritus of linguistics at the University of New Mexico, was an American linguist known for his work on the Navajo language. From the late 1930s, Young cooperated with the Navajo linguist and scholar William Morgan, publishing a "practical orthography" in 1937.

From the 1940s through the 1950s, they published three major works, including The Navajo Language (1943), a compiled dictionary. That year Young and Morgan served as editors and began publication of Ádahooníłígíí, the first newspaper written in Navajo and the second Native American-language newspaper in the United States, after the Cherokee Phoenix of 1828–1834. Its publication contributed to standardization of Navajo orthography.

The men continued their work of analysis and documentation of Navajo; in 1980, 1987 they published The Navajo Language: A Grammar and Colloquial Dictionary, representing "a huge increase in descriptive coverage" of the language. The 1987 edition included new appendices and grammar sections. It established itself as the major reference grammar of the Navajo language. Young, Morgan and Sally Midgette also produced the Analytical Lexicon of Navajo (1992), which re-organizes the lexicon by root, one of the principle elements in verbs and nouns of Athabaskan languages.

== Early life and education ==
Robert Young was born in 1912 in Chicago, Illinois. He became interested in Native American languages, learning both the Spanish language and Nahuatl, an indigenous language, from Mexican immigrant railroad workers. After earning a liberal arts degree from the University of Illinois in 1935, he moved to New Mexico for Native American studies.

He enrolled in graduate school in anthropology at the University of New Mexico and began his study of Navajo. While working at the Southwestern Range and Sheepbreeding Laboratory in Fort Wingate, New Mexico, he became acquainted with William Morgan, a Navajo fellow worker and native of the city. Together in 1937 they published a practical orthography of Navajo.

== Career ==
In the early 1940s Young joined the Bureau of Indian Affairs, where he worked in the Southwest at the Navajo Agency in Window Rock, Arizona. Morgan also joined the BIA, and the two worked together for decades on the Navajo language, making it the most documented indigenous language in the United States.

As a linguist, Young worked primarily on programs related to analyzing and expanding documentation of the Navajo language, encouraging its written use, and education in the language. He collaborated with Navajo scholar William Morgan on all his major projects. From the 1940s through the 1950s, they produced a variety of reading materials in Navajo, and three "important works on lexicon and grammar." The first was a dictionary, The Navajo Language (1943), organized by root, as one of the principal elements in the verbs of the Athabaskan languages.

In 1943 Young and Morgan became editors of the first Navajo-language newspaper, Ádahooníłígíí, published by the Navajo Agency. It was the second newspaper to be published in a Native American language, after the Cherokee Phoenix, which was founded in 1828 and published through 1834 (it was revived intermittently and began regular publication again in the late 20th century, including online). The newspaper Ádahooníłígíí was published through the late 1950s.

Their work was interrupted by World War II. Young served a stint in the Marine Corps and during this period, he worked on the Navajo Code Talker project. They developed a code based on the Navajo language for high-level communications. Navajo-speaking soldiers were recruited for such communications of intelligence, and no enemy was ever able to break this code.

Returning to the BIA, Young continued to work with Morgan and other Navajo. They published The Function and Significance of Certain Navajo Particles (1948) and A Vocabulary of Colloquial Navajo (1951), which was an English to Navajo dictionary. They also published Navajo Historical Selections (1954), Phoenix: Bureau of Indian Affairs.

Upon his retirement from the BIA in 1971, Young became an adjunct professor of Linguistics at the University of New Mexico. He continued his work with Morgan, until Morgan's death. In 1980 and 1987, they published The Navajo Language: A Grammar and Colloquial Dictionary (TNL), representing "a huge increase in descriptive coverage" of the language.

The 1987 edition of TNL is the primary reference grammar of Navajo. Young, Morgan and Sally Midgette also produced the Analytical Lexicon of Navajo (1992), organizes the lexicon by roots and stems, one of the primary elements in the verbs of the language.

== Discussion of works ==
- The Navajo Language edition of 1943 was organized by root, a highly salient elements in nouns and verbs of the language. In a 1974 survey, Navajos requested a dictionary organized by word, as it reflected their own knowledge of the language.
- Young and Morgan achieved this in the 1980 and 1987 editions of, The Navajo Language: A Grammar and Colloquial Dictionary. The later volume consists of a 437-page grammar, with appendices, followed by a separately numbered Navajo-English, English-Navajo dictionary (pp. 1–1069). The grammar section is primarily concerned with the structure of the verbs. Verbs are productive and are the most complex elements in the language (the coverage of the Navajo nouns consists of 8 pages (1–8) in the grammar). The grammar section ends with 8 Appendices, beginning with the Appendix I: Model Paradigms, a listing of the Base and Extended Paradigms, laying the out conjugation patterns of the mode/subject morphemes. These paradigms play an important role in the dictionary entries. In the dictionary section, the entries are fully inflected words, given in the first person imperfective form of the word as the default form. Each entry is referenced to the paradigms, or conjugations, that the word inflects in, thus demonstrating the inflectional system for that entry.
- Analytical Lexicon of Navajo (1992) is organized by the roots/stems, in response to the requests of linguists and non-native Navajo speakers. Young published The Navajo Verb System: An Overview (2000), after Morgan's death.

== Legacy and honors ==
In July 1996, Robert Young and William Morgan were honored in the Navajo Nation Council Chambers for their work on the Navajo language. The two were presented with Pendleton blankets embroidered with the seal of the Navajo Nation by members of the Navajo Language Academy, including Paul Platero, Ellavina Perkins, Alyse Neundorf, and MaryAnn Willie. The Academy was founded that year and formally incorporated in 1999, to train teachers in scientific study of the Navajo language. In January 2006, the Linguistic Society of America honored Robert Young, then 93, at their Annual Meeting, presenting him with the Kenneth Hale Award, stating: "The Navajo Language is remarkable for its structure and the robustness of its documentation. It’s comprised of two key parts, a grammar with appendices and a dictionary, interrelated by an ingenious system of cross-referencing. Because Navajo is a polysynthetic language with a rich verbal morphology, a fully inflected word is a complex entity. In accordance with the wishes of native speakers, the dictionary entries are fully inflected form; each word is capable of being inflected in a number of different ways, determined by use and by principles that are not entirely understood. Their system links the dictionary entries to the conjugation and paradigm patterns that that particular word may appear in, thus reflecting a native speaker’s knowledge and providing a map of morpheme distribution and co-occurrence restrictions. The dictionary thus stands as an implemented model of a polysynthetic lexicon, while at the same time providing robust documentation of the language. In addition to this, each and every entry contains examples of the inflected word, as it is used, in full utterances, effectively presenting an etymology of a given word, as well as documentation of the Navajo language as it was spoken in the mid-twentieth century."

The University of New Mexico Department of Linguistics established a scholarship in Young's honor, available for students who study Native American languages.

== Death ==
Young died on February 20, 2007, in Albuquerque, New Mexico.

== See also ==
- Navajo Community College Press
