= Transmotion =

- Discipline: Native American studies
- Language: English
- Edited by: David Carlson; James Mackay; Bryn Skibo; Steve Sexton; David Stirrup; Miriam Brown-Spiers

Publication details
- History: 2015–present
- Publisher: University of Kent (Transnational publication)
- Frequency: Biannual
- Open access: Yes
- License: Creative Commons Attribution 4.0 International License.

Standard abbreviations
- ISO 4: Transmotion

Indexing
- ISSN: 2059-0911

Links
- Journal homepage; Open access archive

Transmotion is a biannual peer-reviewed academic journal covering Native American literatures and Indigenous culture more broadly. It is hosted by the University of Kent, UK, and results from a collaboration between California State University, San Bernardino, the University of Kent, European University Cyprus and the Portland State University. The journal is fully diamond open access; current and past issues are free to view, and it publishes under a Creative commons license.

Transmotion publishes new scholarship focused on "theoretical, experimental, postmodern, and avant-garde writing produced by Native American and First Nations authors," as well as wider issues within Indigenous Studies considered broadly. It also contains book reviews on relevant work. The name comes from the work of Gerald Vizenor, in which "transmotion" is theorized as "a visionary resistance and sense of natural motion over separatism, literary denouement, and cultural victimry." It is closely related to Vizenor's concept of survivance.

== Notable articles ==
- Garsha, Jeremiah (2019-06-26). "Red Paint: Transnational Movements of Deconstructing, Decolonizing, and Defacing Colonial Structures". Transmotion. 5 (1): 76–103. doi:10.22024/UniKent/03/tm.571. ISSN 2059-0911.
- Uran, Shaawano Chad (2018-04-25). "Policing Resource Extraction and Human Rights in The Land of the Dead". Transmotion. 4 (1): 77–93. doi:10.22024/UniKent/03/tm.395. ISSN 2059-0911.
