= Brenda Child =

Ojibwe historian and author

Brenda J. Child
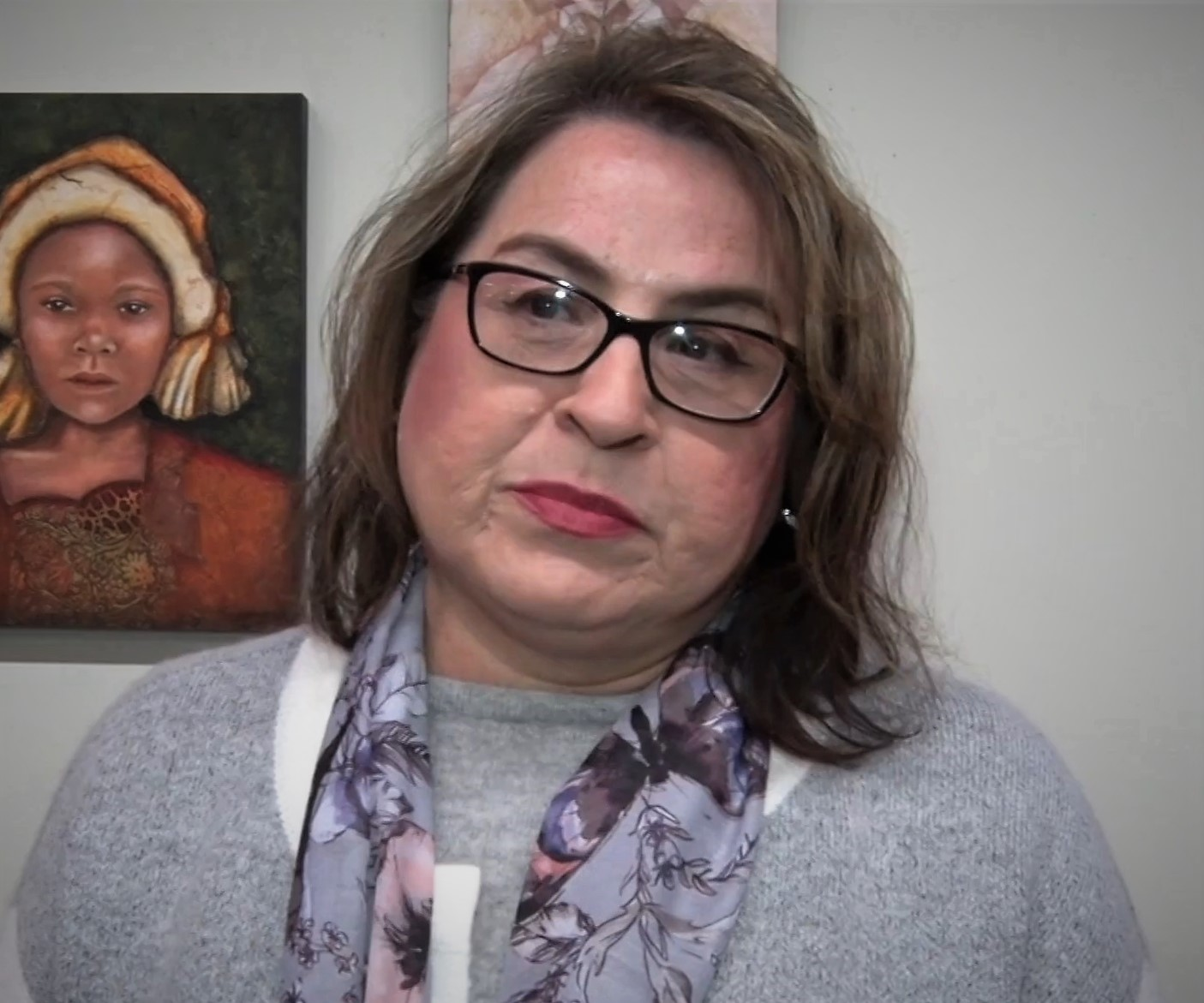
- Child in 2016
- Born: 1959 (age 66–67)
- Occupations: Historian, Author, Educator

Academic background
- Education: Bemidji State University (BA); University of Iowa (MA); University of Iowa (PhD)
- Thesis: A bitter lesson : Native Americans and the government boarding school experience, 1890–1940 (1993)
- Academic advisor: Linda K. Kerber

Academic work
- Discipline: American Indian History, Indigenous Education
- Sub-discipline: Twentieth-century Ojibwe history of the Great Lakes
- Institutions: University of Minnesota
- Doctoral students: Patricia Marroquin Norby
- Website: https://cla.umn.edu/about/directory/profile/child011

Brenda J. Child (born 1959) is an Ojibwe historian and author.

== Early life and education ==
Child was born on the Red Lake Ojibwe Reservation (Miskwaagamiiwizaag'igan) in Northern Minnesota in 1959. She is a citizen of the Red Lake band of Chippewa and a historian.

Child received a Bachelor of Arts in history and social studies from Bemidji State University, a Master of Arts in history from the University of Iowa (1983), and a Doctor of Philosophy in history from the University of Iowa (1993).

== Biography ==
Child is Northrop Professor of American Studies at the University of Minnesota. Her scholarship focuses on American Indian history, including the legacy of American Indian boarding schools in the United States, the role of Ojibwe women in preserving culture, Indigenous education, social history, and the historical legacy of the jingle dress. She also published an award-winning children's book, Bowwow Powwow Bagosenjige-niimi’idim. She served as president of the Native American and Indigenous Studies Association from 2017 to 2018.

Child has worked closely with several museums and heritage organizations, including the Minnesota Historical Society. She was a trustee of the National Museum of the American Indian Smithsonian where she served on the Repatriation Committee, Executive Committee, and the Scholarship and Collections Committee from 2013 to 2019. Additionally, Child offered her expertise for the Heard Museum as a consultant during the creation of the exhibit, Remembering our Indian School Days. In 2022, Child was awarded a Guggenheim Fellowship for her work.

Child served on the Constitutional Reform Committee of the Red Lake Band of Chippewa, of which she is a member, to write a new constitution for the tribe.

== Scholarship ==
Child's research and scholarship focuses on Ojibwe history. She has also curated museum exhibits and contributed to public history efforts, including co-founding the Ojibwe People's Dictionary with John Nichols. In 2019 Child curated an exhibit about the legacy of the jingle dress titled, Ziibaask'iganagooday: The Jingle Dress at 100. In 2025, she was nominated for a Minnesota Book Award for co-editing Dreaming our Futures: Ojibwe and Očhéthi Šakówiņ Artists and Knowledge Keepers. Dr. Child is currently working on a new book entitled, The Marriage Blanket: Love, Violence and the Law in Indian Country.

== Selected works ==
- "Relative Sovereignty: Adoptive Couple v. Baby Girl”, in Fight of the Century: Writers Reflect on 100 Years of Landmark ACLU Cases, eds. Michael Chabon & Ayelet Waldman, (New York, Simon & Schuster, 268–279, 2020)
- Bowwow Powwow: Bagosenjige-niimi’idim, trans. Gordon Jourdain, illus. Jonathan Thunder (Saint Paul: Minnesota Historical Society Press, 2018)
- My Grandfather’s Knocking Sticks: Ojibwe Family Life and Labor on the Reservation (Saint Paul: Minnesota Historical Society Press, 2014)
- Indian Subjects: Hemispheric Perspectives on the History of Indigenous Education, with Brian Klopotek (Santa Fe: School of Advanced Research Press, 2014)
- Holding Our World Together: Ojibwe Women and the Survival of Community (New York: The Penguin Library in American Indian History, 2012)
- "Politically Purposeful Work: Ojibwe Women’s Labor and Leadership in Postwar Minneapolis,” in Indigenous Women and Work: From Labor to Activism, ed. Carol Williams, University of Illinois Press, 240–253.
- “The Absence of Indigenous Histories in Ken Burns’ The National Parks: America’s Best Idea,” The Public Historian, Vol 33, No 2, May 2011, 24–29.
- "I’ve Done My Share: Ojibwe People and World War II,” with Karissa White, Minnesota History, Volume 6, Issue 5, 196-207, 2009.
- “Wilma’s Jingle Dress: Ojibwe Women and Healing in the Early Twentieth Century,” in Reflections on American Indian History: Honoring the Past. Building a Future, edited by Albert L. Hurtado with an introduction by Wilma Mankiller (Norman: University of Oklahoma Press, 2008) 113–136.
- Away From Home: American Indian Boarding School Experiences, 1879–2000, eds. Margaret Archuleta, Brenda J. Child, and K. Tsianina Lomawaima. (Phoenix: The Heard Museum, 2000).
- Boarding School Seasons: American Indian Families, 1900–1940 (Lincoln: The University of Nebraska Press,1998).
- “The Runaways: Student Rebellion at Flandreau and Haskell,” Journal of American Indian Education, Arizona State University, Tempe, Arizona, Vol. 35, No. 3, Spring, 1996, 49–57.
- “Homesickness, Illness and Death: Native American Girls in Government Boarding Schools,” in Women of Color and the Experience of Health and Illness, eds. Barbara Bair and Susan Cayleff, (Detroit: Wayne State University Press, 1993) 169- 179.
- "A bitter lesson: Native Americans and the government boarding school experience, 1890–1940." PhD thesis. University of Iowa, 1993.

== Awards ==
- Guggenheim Fellowship Award (2022–23)
- American Indian Youth Literature Award, Best Picture Book (ALA) (2020)
- AASLH Award of Merit for Leadership in History (2016)
- American Indian Book Award (Labriola National American Indian Data Center) (2014)
- Best Book in Midwestern History (Midwestern Historical Association) (2014)
- North American Indian Prose Award (1995)
