= Navajo language =

Southern Athabaskan language

Navajo
- Diné bizaad
- Pronunciation: [tìnépìz̥ɑ̀ːt]
- Native to: United States
- Region: Arizona; New Mexico; Utah; Colorado
- Ethnicity: 332,129 Navajo (2021)
- Native speakers: 170,000 (2019 census)
- Language family: Na-Dené: Athabaskan; Southern Athabaskan; Southwestern Apache; Western; Navajo
- Writing system: Latin (Navajo alphabet); Navajo Braille

Official status
- Official language in: Navajo Nation

Language codes
- ISO 639-1: nv
- ISO 639-2: nav
- ISO 639-3: nav
- Glottolog: nava1243
- ELP: Diné Bizaad (Navajo)
- The Navajo Nation, where the language is most spoken

- People: Diné
- Language: Diné Bizaad, Diné Yideez, Hak'éí Yideez
- Country: Dinétah

Navajo or Navaho (/ˈnævəhoʊ, ˈnɑːvə-/ NAV-ə-hoh, NAH-və-; Diné bizaad [tìnépìz̥ɑ̀ːt] or Naabeehó bizaad [nɑ̀ːpèːhópìz̥ɑ̀ːt]) is a Southern Athabaskan language of the Na-Dené family, through which it is related to languages spoken across the western areas of North America. Navajo is spoken primarily in the Southwestern United States, especially in the Navajo Nation. It is one of the most widely spoken Native American languages and is the most widely spoken north of the Mexico–United States border, with almost 170,000 Americans speaking Navajo at home as of 2011.

The language has struggled to keep a healthy speaker base, although this problem has been alleviated to some extent by extensive education programs in the Navajo Nation. In World War II, speakers of the Navajo language joined the military and developed a code for sending secret messages. These code talkers' messages are widely credited with saving many lives and winning some of the most decisive battles in the war.

Navajo has a fairly large phonemic inventory, including several consonants that are not found in English. Its four basic vowel qualities are distinguished for nasality, length, and tone. Navajo has both agglutinative and fusional elements: it uses affixes to modify verbs, and nouns are typically created from multiple morphemes, but in both cases these morphemes are fused irregularly and beyond easy recognition. Basic word order is subject–object–verb, though it is highly flexible to pragmatic factors. Verbs are conjugated for aspect and mood, and given affixes for the person and number of both subjects and objects, as well as a host of other variables.

The language's orthography, which was developed in the late 1930s, is based on the Latin script. Most Navajo vocabulary is Athabaskan in origin, as the language has been conservative with loanwords due to its highly complex noun morphology.

== Nomenclature ==
The word Navajo is an exonym: it comes from the Tewa word navahúuˀu, which combines the forms nava ('field') and húuˀu ('valley') to mean 'farm fields adjoining a valley'. It was borrowed into Spanish to refer to an area of present-day northwestern New Mexico, and later into English for the Navajo tribe and their language. The alternative spelling Navaho is considered antiquated; even the anthropologist Berard Haile spelled it with a "j" despite his personal objections. The Navajo refer to themselves as the Diné ('People'), with their language known (its endonym) as Diné bizaad ('People's language') or Naabeehó bizaad.

== Classification ==
Navajo is an Athabaskan language; Navajo and Apache languages make up the southernmost branch of the family. Most of the other Athabaskan languages are located in Alaska, northwestern Canada, and along the North American Pacific coast.

Most languages in the Athabaskan family have tones. However, this feature is believed to have evolved independently in all subgroups as the reconstructed Proto-Athabaskan language had no tones. In each case, tone evolved from glottalic consonants at the ends of morphemes; however, the progression of these consonants into tones has not been consistent, with some related morphemes being pronounced with high tones in some Athabaskan languages and low tones in others. It has been posited that Navajo and Chipewyan, which have no common ancestor more recent than Proto-Athabaskan and possess many pairs of corresponding but opposite tones, evolved from different dialects of Proto-Athabaskan that pronounced these glottalic consonants differently. Proto-Athabaskan diverged fully into separate languages c. 500 BC.

Navajo is most closely related to Western Apache, with which it shares a similar tonal scheme and more than 92 percent of its vocabulary, and to Chiricahua-Mescalero Apache. It is estimated that the Apachean linguistic groups separated and became established as distinct societies, of which the Navajo were one, somewhere between 1300 and 1525. Navajo is generally considered mutually intelligible with all other Apachean languages.

== History ==
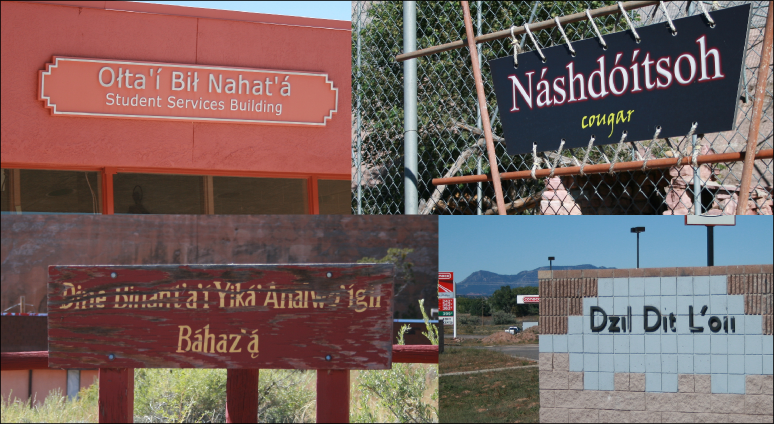
Examples of written Navajo on public signs. Clockwise from top left: Student Services Building, Diné College; cougar exhibit, Navajo Nation Zoo; shopping center near Navajo, New Mexico; notice of reserved parking, Window Rock

The Apachean languages, including Navajo, are thought to have arrived in the American Southwest from the north by 1500, as various peoples migrated through Alberta and Wyoming. Archaeological finds considered indicative of proto-Navajo have been located in far northern New Mexico around the La Plata, Animas and Pine rivers, dating to around 1500. In 1936, linguist Edward Sapir showed how the arrival of the Navajo people in the new arid climate among the corn agriculturalists of the Pueblo area was reflected in their language by tracing the changing meanings of words from Proto-Athabaskan to Navajo. For example, the word *dè:, which in Proto-Athabaskan meant "horn" and "dipper made from animal horn", in Navajo became a-deeʼ, which meant "gourd" or "dipper made from gourd". Likewise, the Proto-Athabaskan word *ł-yəx̣s "snow lies on the ground" in Navajo became yas "snow". Similarly, the Navajo word for "corn" is naadą́ą́', derived from two Proto-Athabaskan roots meaning "enemy" and "food", suggesting that the Navajo originally considered corn to be "food of the enemy" when they first arrived among the Pueblo people.

=== Navajo Code Talkers ===
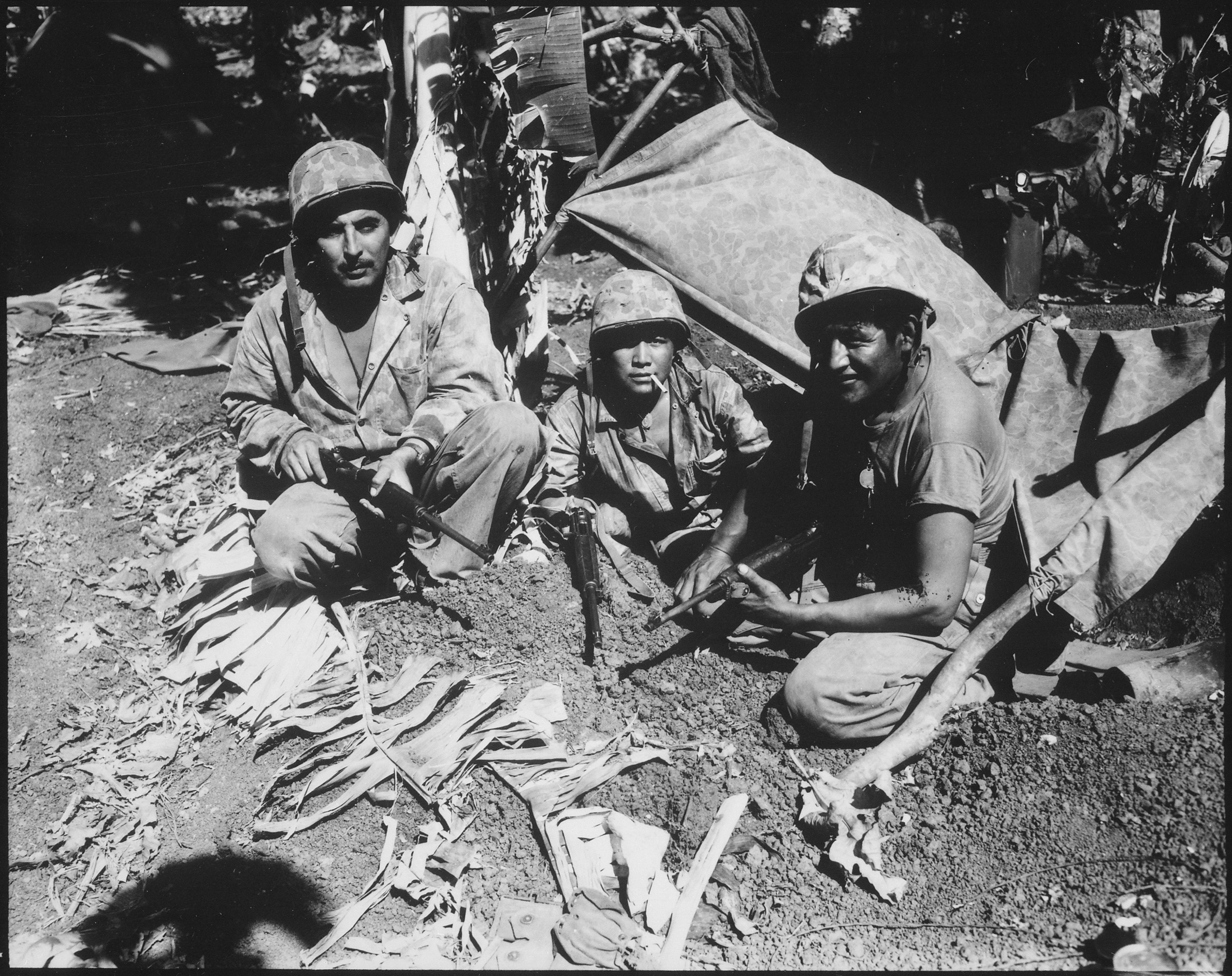
Navajo code talkers, Saipan, June 1944

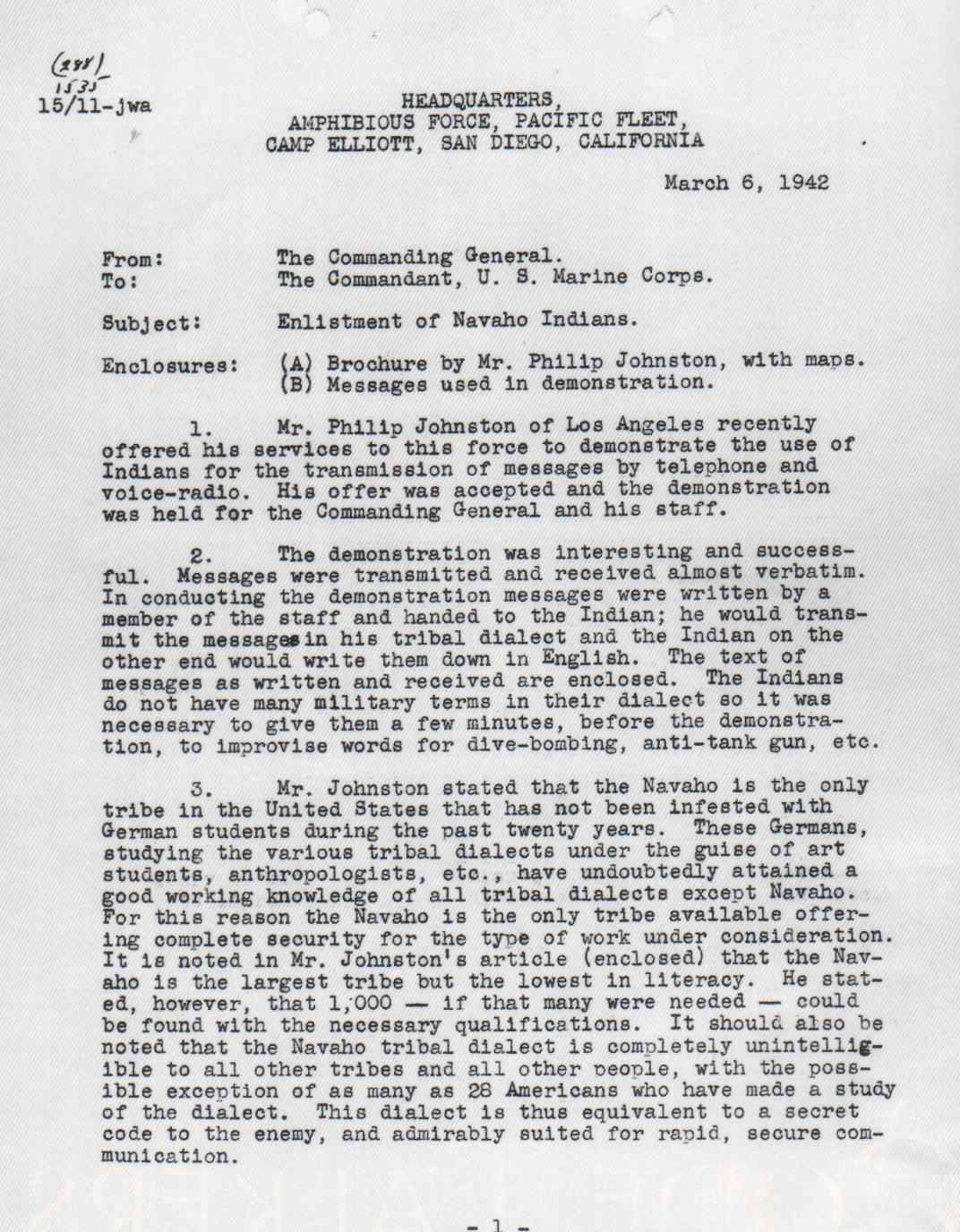
General Clayton Barney Vogel's recommendation letter for Navajo to be used by code talkers during World War II

During World Wars I and II, the U.S. government employed speakers of the Navajo language as Navajo code talkers to relay sensitive information that must remain secret.

The Navajo language was used for military codes for several reasons: it had a relatively large pool of speakers who could serve in the US military, but was not well-known to outsiders other than small numbers of academics and missionaries (~30), and is a very complex language with several dialects. Navajo Code Talkers could also generate coded messages much faster than other methods. At the end of the war the code remained unbroken.

The code used Navajo words for each letter of the English alphabet. Messages could be encoded and decoded by using a simple substitution cipher where the ciphertext was the Navajo word. Type two code was informal and directly translated from English into Navajo. If there was no word in Navajo to describe a military word, code talkers used descriptive words. For example, the Navajo did not have a word for submarine, so they translated it as iron fish.

These Navajo code talkers are widely recognized for their contributions to WWII. Major Howard Connor, 5th Marine Division Signal Officer stated, "Were it not for the Navajos, the Marines would never have taken Iwo Jima."

=== Colonization ===
Modern-day Navajo lands were occupied by Indigenous groups termed Ancestral Puebloans until about 1300 CE, and later the Ute and Piute peoples starting circa 1150–1300 AD. Navajo and other Athabaskan speakers migrated to the region in several waves starting circa 1400 CE if not slightly earlier. There is significant debate about timelines and other details, but evidence shows violent hostility and competition within and between these groups. Various forms of slavery or servitude were widely practiced by Navajo peoples before European contact, most commonly of women and children, and ranging from adoption into kinship networks to coerced labor and enslavement.

First colonization by European forces of Navajo territory began with the Spanish Empire in the early seventeenth century, shortly after this area was annexed as part of the Spanish viceroyalty of New Spain. After Mexican independence from Spain in 1821, most Navajo territory was under Mexican control.

When the United States annexed these territories in 1848 following the Mexican–American War, the English-speaking settlers allowed Navajo children to attend their schools. In some cases, the United States established separate schools for Navajo and other Native American children. In the late 19th century, it founded boarding schools, often operated by religious missionary groups. In efforts to acculturate the children, school authorities insisted that they learn to speak English and practice Christianity. Students routinely had their mouths washed out with lye soap as a punishment if they did speak Navajo. Consequently, when these students grew up and had children of their own, they often did not teach them Navajo, in order to prevent them from being punished.

Robert W. Young and William Morgan, who both worked for the Navajo Agency of the Bureau of Indian Affairs, developed and published a practical orthography in 1937. It helped spread education among Navajo speakers. In 1943 the men collaborated on The Navajo Language, a dictionary organized by the roots of the language. In World War II, the United States military used speakers of Navajo as code talkers—to transmit top-secret military messages over telephone and radio in a code based on Navajo. The language was considered ideal because of its grammar, which differs strongly from that of German and Japanese, and because no published Navajo dictionaries existed at the time.

By the 1960s, Indigenous languages of the United States had been declining in use for some time. Native American language use began to decline more quickly in this decade as paved roads were built and English-language radio was broadcast to tribal areas. Navajo was no exception, although its large speaker pool—larger than that of any other Native language in the United States—gave it more staying power than most. Adding to the language's decline, federal acts passed in the 1950s to increase educational opportunities for Navajo children had resulted in pervasive use of English in their schools.

In more recent years, the number of monolingual Navajo speakers have been declining, and most younger Navajo people are bilingual. Near the 1990s, many Navajo children have little to no knowledge in Navajo language, only knowing English.

=== Revitalization and current status ===
In 1968, U.S. President Lyndon B. Johnson signed the Bilingual Education Act, which provided funds for educating young students who are not native English speakers. The Act had mainly been intended for Spanish-speaking children—particularly Mexican Americans—but it applied to all recognized linguistic minorities. Many Native American tribes seized the chance to establish their own bilingual education programs. However, qualified teachers who were fluent in Native languages were scarce, and these programs were largely unsuccessful.

However, data collected in 1980 showed that 85 percent of Navajo first-graders were bilingual, compared to 62 percent of Navajo of all ages—early evidence of a resurgence of use of their traditional language among younger people. In 1984, to counteract the language's historical decline, the Navajo Nation Council decreed that the Navajo language would be available and comprehensive for students of all grade levels in schools of the Navajo Nation. This effort was aided by the fact that, largely due to the work of Young and Morgan, Navajo is one of the best-documented Native American languages. In 1980 they published a monumental expansion of their work on the language, organized by word (first initial of vowel or consonant) in the pattern of English dictionaries, as requested by Navajo students. The Navajo Language: A Grammar and Colloquial Dictionary also included a 400-page grammar, making it invaluable for both native speakers and students of the language. Particularly in its organization of verbs, it was oriented to Navajo speakers. They expanded this work again in 1987, with several significant additions, and this edition continues to be used as an important text.

The Native American language education movement has been met with adversity, such as by English-only campaigns in some areas in the late 1990s. However, Navajo-immersion programs have cropped up across the Navajo Nation. Statistical evidence shows that Navajo-immersion students generally do better on standardized tests than their counterparts educated only in English. Some educators have remarked that students who know their native languages feel a sense of pride and identity validation. Since 1989, Diné College, a Navajo tribal community college, has offered an associate degree in the subject of Navajo. This program includes language, literature, culture, medical terminology, and teaching courses and produces the highest number of Navajo teachers of any institution in the United States. About 600 students attend per semester. One major university that teaches classes in the Navajo language is Arizona State University. In 1992, Young and Morgan published another major work on Navajo: Analytical Lexicon of Navajo, with the assistance of Sally Midgette (Navajo). This work is organized by root, the basis of Athabaskan languages.

A 1991 survey of 682 preschoolers on the Navajo Reservation Head Start program found that 54 percent were monolingual English speakers, 28 percent were bilingual in English and Navajo, and 18 percent spoke only Navajo. This study noted that while the preschool staff knew both languages, they spoke English to the children most of the time. In addition, most of the children's parents spoke to the children in English more often than in Navajo. The study concluded that the preschoolers were in "almost total immersion in English". An American Community Survey taken in 2011 found that 169,369 Americans spoke Navajo at home—0.3 percent of Americans whose primary home language was not English. Of primary Navajo speakers, 78.8 percent reported they spoke English "very well", a fairly high percentage overall but less than among other Americans speaking a different Native American language (85.4 percent). Navajo was the only Native American language afforded its own category in the survey; domestic Navajo speakers represented 46.4 percent of all domestic Native language speakers (only 195,407 Americans have a different home Native language). As of July 2014, Ethnologue classes Navajo as "6b" (In Trouble), signifying that few, but some, parents teach the language to their offspring and that concerted efforts at revitalization could easily protect the language. Navajo had a high population for a language in this category. About half of all Navajo people live on Navajo Nation land, an area spanning parts of Arizona, New Mexico, and Utah; others are dispersed throughout the United States. Under tribal law, fluency in Navajo is mandatory for candidates to the office of the President of the Navajo Nation.

Both original and translated media have been produced in Navajo. The first works tended to be religious texts translated by missionaries, including the Bible. From 1943 to about 1957, the Navajo Agency of the BIA published Ádahooníłígíí ("Events"), the first newspaper in Navajo and the only one to be written entirely in Navajo. It was edited by Robert W. Young and William Morgan, Sr. (Navajo). They had collaborated on The Navajo Language, a major language dictionary published that same year, and continued to work on studying and documenting the language in major works for the next few decades. Today an AM radio station, KTNN, broadcasts in Navajo and English, with programming including music and NFL games; AM station KNDN broadcasts only in Navajo. When Super Bowl XXX was broadcast in Navajo in 1996, it was the first time a Super Bowl had been carried in a Native American language. In 2013, the 1977 film Star Wars was translated into Navajo. It was the first major motion picture translated into any Native American language.

On October 5, 2018, an early beta of a Navajo course was released on Duolingo, a popular language learning app.

On December 30, 2024, Navajo Nation President Buu Nygren made Navajo the official language of the Navajo Nation by signing legislation. He said, “One of my priorities coming in as President has always been to make sure that we make Navajo cool again.” This is in order to promote the intergenerational preservation of the Navajo language within the Navajo Nation and intending to work in conjunction with the Diné Language Teachers Association to foster the utilization of the Navajo language.

=== Education ===
The Navajo Nation operates Tséhootsooí Diné Bi'ólta', a Navajo language immersion school for grades K-8 in Fort Defiance, Arizona. Located on the Arizona-New Mexico border in the southeastern quarter of the Navajo Reservation, the school strives to revitalize Navajo among children of the Window Rock Unified School District. Tséhootsooí Diné Bi'ólta' has thirteen Navajo language teachers who instruct only in the Navajo language, and no English, while five English language teachers instruct in the English language. Kindergarten and first grade are taught completely in the Navajo language, while English is incorporated into the program during third grade, when it is used for about 10% of instruction. In the 2020s, the language nest Saad K’ildyé was established near Albuquerque through a non-profit Diné-led organization. The school also offers classes to parents and family activities revolving around Diné culture.

After many Navajo schools were closed during World War II, a program aiming to provide education to Navajo children was funded in the 1950s, where the number of students quickly doubled in the next decade. According to the Navajo Nation Education Policies, the Navajo Tribal Council requests that schools teach both English and Navajo so that the children would remain bilingual, though their influence over the school systems was very low. A small number of preschool programs provide a Navajo-language immersion curriculum, which teaches children basic Navajo vocabulary and grammar under the assumption that they have no prior knowledge in the Navajo language.

== Phonology ==
nishłį́
The second syllable of the word nishłį́ (I am) involves the phoneme /ɬ/, a high tone, and nasalization.

Navajo has a fairly large consonant inventory. Its stop consonants exist in three laryngeal forms: tenuis, aspirated, and ejective—for example, /k/, /kʰ/, and /kʼ/. Ejective consonants are those that are pronounced with a glottalic initiation. Navajo also has a simple glottal stop used after vowels, and every word that would otherwise begin with a vowel is pronounced with an initial glottal stop. Consonant clusters are uncommon, aside from frequent placing /d/ or /t/ before fricatives.

The language has four vowel qualities: /a/, /e/, /i/, and /o/. Each exists in both oral and nasalized forms, and can be either short or long. Navajo also distinguishes for tone between high and low, with the low tone typically regarded as the default. However, some linguists have suggested that Navajo does not possess true tones, but only a pitch accent system similar to that of Japanese. In general, Navajo speech also has a slower speech tempo than English does.

Consonants
		Bilabial	Alveolar			Palato- alveolar	Palatal	Velar		Glottal	
		Bilabial	plain	lateral	sibilant	Palato- alveolar	Palatal	plain	labial	plain	labial
Plosive/ Affricate	tenuis	p	t	tˡ	ts	tʃ		k		ʔ	
Plosive/ Affricate	aspirated		tʰ	tɬʰ	tsʰ	tʃʰ		kʰ	(kʷʰ)		
Plosive/ Affricate	ejective		tʼ	tɬʼ	tsʼ	tʃʼ		kʼ			
Continuant	fortis			ɬ	s	ʃ		x	(xʷ)	(h)	(hʷ)
Continuant	lenis			l	z	ʒ	j ~ ʝ	ɣ ~ ɰ	(ɣʷ)		
Sonorant	plain	m	n	l			j ~ ʝ	ɣ ~ ɰ	(ɣʷ)		
Sonorant	glottalic	(mˀ)	(nˀ)				(jˀ)		(wˀ)		

Oral, Long
	Front	Back
Close	iː	
Mid	eː	oː
Open		ɑː

Oral, Short
	Front	Back
Close	ɪ	
Mid	ɛ	ɔ ~ ɞ
Open		ɑ

Nasal, Long
	Front	Back
Close	ĩː	
Mid	ẽː	õː
Open		ɑ̃ː

Nasal, Short
	Front	Back
Close	ĩ	
Mid	ẽ	õ
Open		ɑ̃

== Orthography ==
Early attempts at a Navajo orthography were made in the late nineteenth and early twentieth centuries. One such attempt was based on the Latin alphabet, particularly the English variety, with some additional letters and diacritics. Anthropologists were frustrated by Navajo's having several sounds that are not found in English and lack of other sounds that are. Finally, the current Navajo orthography was developed between 1935 and 1940 by Young and Morgan.

Navajo Orthography
ʼ ʔ	a ɑ	á ɑ́	ą ɑ̃	ą́ ɑ̃́	aa ɑː	áá ɑ́ː	ąą ɑ̃ː	ą́ą́ ɑ̃́ː	b p	ch tʃʰ	chʼ tʃʼ	d t	dl tˡ	dz ts	e e
é é	ę ẽ	ę́ ẽ́	ee eː	éé éː	ęę ẽː	ę́ę́ ẽ́ː	g k	gh ɣ	h h/x	hw hʷ/xʷ	i ɪ	í ɪ́	į ɪ̃	į́ ɪ̃́	ii ɪː
íí ɪ́ː	įį ɪ̃ː	į́į́ ɪ̃́ː	j tʃ	k kʰ/kx	kʼ kʼ	kw kʰʷ/kxʷ	l l	ł ɬ	m m	n n	o o	ó ó	ǫ õ	ǫ́ ṍ	oo oː
óó óː	ǫǫ õː	ǫ́ǫ́ ṍː	s s	sh ʃ	t tʰ/tx	tʼ tʼ	tł tɬʰ	tłʼ tɬʼ	ts tsʰ	tsʼ tsʼ	w w/ɣʷ	x h/x	y j/ʝ	z z	zh ʒ

An apostrophe (ʼ) is used to mark ejective consonants (e.g. chʼ, tłʼ) as well as mid-word or final glottal stops. However, initial glottal stops are usually not marked.

The voiceless glottal fricative (/h/) is normally written as h, but appears as x after the consonant s (optionally after sh) at syllable boundary (ex: yiyiis-xı̨́), and when it represents the depreciative augment found after stem initial (ex: tsxı̨́įł-go, yi-chxa). The voiced velar fricative is written as y before i and e (where it is palatalized /ʝ/), as w before o (where it is labialized /ɣʷ/), and as gh before a.

Navajo represents nasalized vowels with an ogonek ( ˛ ), sometimes described as a reverse cedilla; and represents the voiceless alveolar lateral fricative (/ɬ/) with a barred L (capital Ł, lowercase ł). The ogonek is most often placed centrally under a vowel, but it was imported from Polish and Lithuanian, which do not usually center it nor use it under certain vowels such as o or any vowels with accent marks. For example, in Navajo works, the ogonek below lowercase a is most often shown centered below the letter, whereas fonts with a with ogonek intended for Polish and Lithuanian have its ogonek connected to the bottom right of the letter. Very few Unicode fonts display the ogonek differently in Navajo with language tagging than in Polish or Lithuanian.

Navajo Standard keyboard layouts, Navajo font (top) and Unicode (bottom)

The first Navajo-capable typewriter was developed in preparation for a Navajo newspaper and dictionary created in the 1940s. The advent of early computers in the 1960s necessitated special fonts to input Navajo text, and the first Navajo font was created in the 1970s. Navajo virtual keyboards were made available for iOS devices in November 2012 and Android devices in August 2013.

== Grammar ==
=== Typology ===
Navajo is difficult to classify in terms of broad morphological typology: it relies heavily on affixes—mainly prefixes—like agglutinative languages, but these affixes are joined in unpredictable, overlapping ways that make them difficult to segment, a trait of fusional languages. In general, Navajo verbs contain more morphemes than nouns do (on average, 11 for verbs compared to 4–5 for nouns), but noun morphology is less transparent. Depending on the source, Navajo is either classified as a fusional, agglutinative, or even polysynthetic language, as it shows mechanisms from all three.

In terms of basic word order, Navajo has been classified as a subject–object–verb language. However, some speakers order the subject and object based on "noun ranking". In this system, nouns are ranked in three categories—humans, animals, and inanimate objects—and within these categories, nouns are ranked by strength, size, and intelligence. Whichever of the subject and object has a higher rank comes first. As a result, the agent of an action may be syntactically ambiguous. The highest rank position is held by humans and lightning. Other linguists such as Eloise Jelinek consider Navajo to be a discourse configurational language, in which word order is not fixed by syntactic rules, but determined by pragmatic factors in the communicative context.

=== Verbs ===
In Navajo, verbs are the main elements of their sentences, imparting a large amount of information. The verb is based on a stem, which is made of a root to identify the action and the semblance of a suffix to convey mode and aspect; however, this suffix is fused beyond separability. The stem is given somewhat more transparent prefixes to indicate, in this order, the following information: postpositional object, postposition, adverb-state, iterativity, number, direct object, deictic information, another adverb-state, mode and aspect, subject, classifier (see later on), mirativity and two-tier evidentiality. Some of these prefixes may be null; for example, there is only a plural marker (da/daa) and no readily identifiable marker for the other grammatical numbers.

Navajo does not distinguish strict tense per se; instead, an action's position in time is conveyed through mode, aspect, but also via time adverbials or context. Each verb has an inherent aspect and can be conjugated in up to seven modes.

For any verb, the usitative and iterative modes share the same stem, as do the progressive and future modes; these modes are distinguished with prefixes. However, pairs of modes other than these may also share the same stem, as illustrated in the following example, where the verb "to play" is conjugated into each of the five mode paradigms:

- Imperfective: -né – is playing, was playing, will be playing
- Perfective: -neʼ – played, had played, will have played
- Progressive/future: -neeł – is playing along / will play, will be playing
- Usitative/iterative: -neeh – usually plays, frequently plays, repeatedly plays
- Optative: -neʼ – would play, may play

The basic set of subject prefixes for the imperfective mode, as well as the actual conjugation of the verb into these person and number categories, are as follows.

	Singular	Dual/plural
1.	sh-	iid-
2.	ni-	oh-
3.	–	
4.	ji-	

	Singular	Dual/plural
1.	naashné – I am playing	neiiʼné – We are playing
2.	naniné – You (s.) are playing	naohné – You (pl.) are playing
3.	naané – He/she/it is playing, they are playing	
4.	najiné – He/she/it/one is playing, they/people are playing	

The remaining piece of these conjugated verbs—the prefix na- —is called an "outer" or "disjunct" prefix. It is the marker of the Continuative aspect (to play about).

Navajo distinguishes between the first, second, third, and fourth persons in the singular, dual, and plural numbers. The fourth person is similar to the third person, but is generally used for indefinite, theoretical actors rather than defined ones. Despite the potential for extreme verb complexity, only the mode/aspect, subject, classifier, and stem are absolutely necessary. Furthermore, Navajo negates clauses by surrounding the verb with the circumclitic doo= ... =da (e.g. mósí doo nitsaa da 'the cat is not big'). Dooda, as a single word, corresponds to English no.

=== Nouns ===
Nouns are not required in order to form a complete Navajo sentence. Besides the extensive information that can be communicated with a verb, Navajo speakers may alternate between the third and fourth person to distinguish between two already specified actors, similarly to how speakers of languages with grammatical gender may repeatedly use pronouns.

Most nouns are not inflected for number, and plurality is usually encoded directly in the verb through the use of various prefixes or aspects, though this is by no means mandatory. In the following example, the verb on the right is used with the plural prefix da- and switches to the distributive aspect.

Some verbal roots encode number in their lexical definition (see classificatory verbs above). When available, the use of the correct verbal root is mandatory:

Béégashii sitį́.
cow 3.SUBJ-lie(1).PERF
'The (one) cow lies.'

Béégashii shitéézh.
cow 3.SUBJ-lie(2).PERF
'The (two) cows lie.'

Béégashii shijééʼ.
cow 3.SUBJ-lie(3+).PERF
'The (three or more) cows lie.'

Bilasáana shaa niʼaah.
bilasáana sh-aa Ø-ni-ʼaah
apple 1-to 3.OBJ-2.SUBJ-give(SRO).MOM.PERF
'You give me an apple.'

Bilasáana shaa ninííł.
bilasáana sh-aa Ø-ni-nííł
apple 1-to 3.OBJ-2.SUBJ-give(PLO1).MOM.PERF
'You give me apples.'

Number marking on nouns occurs only for terms of kinship and age-sex groupings. Other prefixes that can be added to nouns include possessive markers (e.g., chidí 'car' – shichidí 'my car') and a few adjectival enclitics. Generally, an upper limit for prefixes on a noun is about four or five.

Nouns are also not marked for case, this traditionally being covered by word order.

Atʼééd ashkii yiyiiłtsą́.
girl boy 3.OBJ-3.SUBJ-saw
'The girl saw the boy.'

Ashkii atʼééd yiyiiłtsą́.
boy girl 3.OBJ-3.SUBJ-saw
'The boy saw the girl.'

== Vocabulary ==
The vast majority of Navajo vocabulary is of Athabaskan origin. The number of lexical roots is still fairly small; one estimate counted 6,245 noun bases and 9,000 verb bases (with most nouns being derived from verbs), but those are combined with the numerous affixes in a myriad of ways so that words rarely consist of a single stem like English. Prior to the European colonization of the Americas, Navajo did not borrow much from other languages, including from other Athabaskan and even Apachean languages. The Athabaskan family is fairly diverse in both phonology and morphology due to its languages' prolonged relative isolation. Even the Pueblo peoples, with whom the Navajo interacted with for centuries and borrowed cultural customs, have lent few words to the Navajo language. After Spain and Mexico took over Navajo lands, the language did not incorporate many Spanish words, either.

This resistance to word absorption extended to English, at least until the mid-twentieth century. Around this point, the Navajo language began importing some, though still not many, English words, mainly by young schoolchildren exposed to English.

Navajo has expanded its vocabulary to include Western technological and cultural terms through calques and Navajo descriptive terms. For example, the phrase for English tank is chidí naaʼnaʼí beeʼeldǫǫhtsoh bikááʼ dah naaznilígíí 'vehicle that crawls around, by means of which big explosions are made, and that one sits on at an elevation'. This language purism also extends to proper nouns, such as the names of U.S. states (e.g. Hoozdo 'Arizona' and Yootó 'New Mexico'; see also hahoodzo 'state') and languages (naakaii 'Spanish').

Only one Navajo word has been fully absorbed into the English language: hogan (from Navajo hooghan) – a term referring to the traditional houses. Another word with limited English recognition is chindi (an evil spirit of the deceased). The taxonomic genus name Uta may be of Navajo origin. It has been speculated that English-speaking settlers were reluctant to take on more Navajo loanwords compared to many other Native American languages, including the Hopi language, because the Navajo were among the most violent resisters to colonialism.

== Short Navajo Story ==
This is the first paragraph of a Navajo short story.

Navajo original: Ashiiké tʼóó diigis léiʼ tółikaní łaʼ ádiilnííł dóó nihaa nahidoonih níigo yee hodeezʼą́ jiní. Áko tʼáá ałʼąą chʼil naʼatłʼoʼii kʼiidiilá dóó hááhgóóshį́į́ yinaalnishgo tʼáá áłah chʼil naʼatłʼoʼii néineestʼą́ jiní. Áádóó tółikaní áyiilaago tʼáá bíhígíí tʼáá ałʼąą tłʼízíkágí yiiʼ haidééłbįįd jiní. "Háadida díí tółikaní yígíí doo łaʼ ahaʼdiidził da," níigo ahaʼdeetʼą́ jiníʼ. Áádóó baa nahidoonih biniiyé kintahgóó dah yidiiłjid jiníʼ (...)

English translation: Some crazy boys decided to make some wine to sell, so they each planted grapevines and, working hard on them, they raised them to maturity. Then, having made wine, they each filled a goatskin with it. They agreed that at no time would they give each other a drink of it, and they then set out for town lugging the goatskins on their backs (...)

== See also ==
- Navajo Nation – Largest federally recognized tribe in the United States

== General and cited references ==
- Bahr, Howard M. (2004). The Navajo as Seen by the Franciscans, 1898–1921: A Sourcebook. Scarecrow Press. ISBN 978-0-8108-4962-4.
- Beck, David (2006). Aspects of the Theory of Morphology. Vol. 10. Walter De Gruyter.
- Bowerman, Melissa; Levinson, Stephen (2001). Language Acquisition and Conceptual Development. Cambridge University Press. ISBN 978-0-521-59659-6.
- Christiansen, Morten H. (2009). Language Universals. Oxford University Press. ISBN 978-0-195-30543-2.
- Cutler, Charles L. (2000). O Brave New Words: Native American Loanwords in Current English. University of Oklahoma Press. ISBN 978-0-8061-3246-4.
- Faltz, Leonard M. (1998). The Navajo Verb: A Grammar for Students and Scholars. University of New Mexico Press. ISBN 978-0-8263-1902-9.
- Fernald, Theodore; Platero, Paul (2000). The Athabaskan Languages: Perspectives on a Native American Language Family. Oxford University Press. pp. 252–287. ISBN 978-0195119473.
- Mueller-Gathercole, Virginia C. (2008). Routes to Language: Studies in Honor of Melissa Bowerman. Psychology Press. ISBN 978-1-841-69716-1.
- Hargus, Sharon; Rice, Keren (2005). Athabaskan Prosody. John Benjamins Publishing Company. ISBN 978-90-272-4783-4.
- Johansen, Bruce; Ritzker, Barry (2007). Encyclopedia of American Indian History. ABC-CLIO. ISBN 978-1-85109-817-0.
- Koenig, Harriet (2005). Acculturation in the Navajo Eden: New Mexico, 1550–1750: Archaeology, Language, Religion of the Peoples of the Southwest. YBK Publishers, Inc. ISBN 978-0-9764359-1-4.
- Luraghi, Silvia; Parodi, Claudia (2013). The Bloomsbury Companion to Syntax. Bloomsbury Academic. ISBN 978-1-441-12460-9.
- Kroskrity, Paul V.; Field, Margaret C. (2009). Native American Language Ideologies: Beliefs, Practices, and Struggles in Indian Country. University of Arizona Press. ISBN 978-0-8165-2916-2.
- Levy, Jerrold E. (1998). In the Beginning: The Navajo Genesis. University of California Press. ISBN 978-0-520-21277-0.
- McDonough, J.M. (2003). The Navajo Sound System. Kluwer Academic Publishers. ISBN 978-1-4020-1351-5.
- Kozak, David L. (2013). Inside Dazzling Mountains: Southwest Native Verbal Arts. University of Nebraska Press. ISBN 978-0-8032-1575-7.
- Minahan, James (2013). Ethnic Groups of the Americas: An Encyclopedia. ABC-CLIO. ISBN 978-1-61069-163-5.
- Mithun, Marianne (2001). The Languages of Native North America. Cambridge University Press. ISBN 978-0-521-29875-9.
- Platero, Paul; Hinton, Leanne (2001). The Green Book of Language Revitalization in Practice. Academic Press. ISBN 978-90-04-25449-7.
- Sloane, Thomas O. (2001). Encyclopedia of Rhetoric. Oxford University Press. ISBN 978-0-19-512595-5.
- Speas, Margaret (1990). Phrase Structure in Natural Language. Springer. ISBN 978-0-792-30755-6.
- Spolsky, Bernard (2009). Language Management. Cambridge University Press. ISBN 978-0-521-73597-1.
- Wurm, Stephen A.; Mühlhäusler, Peter; Tyron, Darrell T. (1996). Atlas of Languages of Intercultural Communication in the Pacific, Asia, and the Americas. Walter de Gruyter. ISBN 978-3-11-013417-9.
- Yip, Moira (2002). Tone. Cambridge University Press. ISBN 978-0-521-77445-1.
- Young, Robert; Morgan, William Sr. (1987). The Navajo Language: A Grammar and Colloquial Dictionary. University of New Mexico Press. ISBN 978-0-8263-1014-9.
- Young, Robert; Morgan, William Sr. (1992). Analytical Lexicon of Navajo. University of New Mexico Press. ISBN 978-0-8263-1356-0.
- Young, Robert M.; Elinek, Eloise (1996). Athabaskan Language Studies (in English and Navajo). University of New Mexico Press. ISBN 978-0-8263-1705-6.

Indigenous languages of the Americas with Wikipedia
Item	Label/en	native label	Code	distribution map	number of speakers, writers, or signers	UNESCO language status	Ethnologue language status	?itemwiki
Q36806	Southern Quechua	qu:Urin Qichwa qu:Qhichwa qu:Qichwa	qu		6000000	2 vulnerable		Quechua Wikipedia
Q35876	Guarani	gn:Avañe'ẽ	gn		4850000	1 safe	1 National	Guarani Wikipedia
Q4627	Aymara	ay:Aymar aru	ay		4000000	2 vulnerable		Aymara Wikipedia
Q13300	Nahuatl	nah:Nawatlahtolli nah:nawatl nah:mexkatl	nah		1925620	2 vulnerable		Nahuatl Wikipedia
Q891085	Wayuu	guc:Wayuunaiki	guc		300000	2 vulnerable	5 Developing	Wayuu Wikipedia
Q33730	Mapudungun	arn:Mapudungun	arn		300000	3 definitely endangered	6b Threatened	Mapuche Wikipedia
Q13310	Navajo	nv:Diné bizaad nv:Diné	nv		169369	2 vulnerable	6b Threatened	Navajo Wikipedia
Q25355	Greenlandic	kl:Kalaallisut	kl		56200	2 vulnerable	1 National	Greenlandic Wikipedia
Q29921	Inuktitut	ike-cans:ᐃᓄᒃᑎᑐᑦ iu:Inuktitut	iu		39770	2 vulnerable		Inuktitut Wikipedia
Q33388	Cherokee	chr:ᏣᎳᎩ ᎧᏬᏂᎯᏍᏗ chr:ᏣᎳᎩ	chr		12300	4 severely endangered	8a Moribund	Cherokee Wikipedia
Q33390	Cree	cr:ᐃᔨᔨᐤ ᐊᔨᒧᐎᓐ' cr:nēhiyawēwin	cr		10875; 8040			Cree Wikipedia
Q32979	Choctaw	cho:Chahta anumpa cho:Chahta	cho		9200	2 vulnerable	6b Threatened	Choctaw Wikipedia
Q56590	Atikamekw	atj:Atikamekw Nehiromowin atj:Atikamekw	atj		6160	2 vulnerable	5 Developing	Atikamekw Wikipedia
Q27183	Iñupiaq	ik:Iñupiatun	ik		5580	4 severely endangered		Inupiat Wikipedia
Q523014	Muscogee	mus:Mvskoke	mus		4300	3 definitely endangered	7 Shifting	Muscogee Wikipedia
Q33265	Cheyenne	chy:Tsêhesenêstsestôtse	chy		2400	3 definitely endangered	8a Moribund	Cheyenne Wikipedia
