= David E. Wilkins =

Lumbee political scientist

- Education: University of North Carolina at Pembroke; University of Arizona; University of North Carolina at Chapel Hill
- Scientific career
- Fields: Political science; Legal studies; Native American studies
- Workplaces: University of Arizona; University of Minnesota; University of Richmond

David E. Wilkins, a citizen of the Lumbee Nation, is a political scientist specializing in federal Indian policy and law. He is the E. Claiborne Robins Distinguished Professor in Leadership Studies in the University of Richmond’s Jepson School of Leadership Studies and professor emeritus of the University of Minnesota. He studies Indigenous politics, governance, and legal systems, with a particular focus on Native American sovereignty, self-determination, and diplomacy. Wilkins was a student and friend of Vine Deloria Jr., coauthoring two books with Deloria and producing three books about his intellectual impact.

== Education and positions ==
Wilkins attended the University of North Carolina at Pembroke (then called Pembroke State University), graduating with a B.A. degree in 1976. He then studied political science at the University of Arizona, where he obtained an M.A. degree with a thesis entitled An Analysis of Colonial, State, and Federal Definitions of "Indian". From 1984-87 he taught at Dine' College before returning to North Carolina where in 1990 he earned a PhD in political science from the University of North Carolina at Chapel Hill. His PhD dissertation was called The Legal Consciousness of the United States Supreme Court: A Critical Examination of Indian Supreme Court Decisions Regarding Congressional "Plenary" Power and Tribal Sovereignty – 1870-1921.

After completing his PhD, Wilkins spent a year as an adjunct lecturer in the Department of Political Science and American Indian Studies at the University of Arizona before becoming an assistant professor in 1991 and an associate professor in 1997. In 1999 he moved to the University of Minnesota, where he was a professor in the departments of American Indian Studies, Political Science, Law, and American Studies. In 2007 he was named McKnight Presidential Professor in American Indian Studies at the University of Minnesota. In 2019, he became E. Claiborne Robins Distinguished Professor in Leadership Studies at the University of Richmond.

Wilkins has been a visiting faculty member at a number of institutions, including the Gordon Russell Visiting Professor at Dartmouth College and a visiting faculty member at Harvard University, Weber State University, and Evergreen State College.

== Research ==
In addition to writing a number of journal articles, editing several books, and contributing chapters for edited volumes, Wilkins has been the sole author of a dozen books and co-author of ten.

In 1987, Wilkins published his first book, called Dine' Bibeehaz'aanii: A Handbook of Navajo Government. His second book, American Indian Sovereignty and the U.S. Supreme Court: The Masking of Justice, was published in 1997. The book details a series of historical decisions by the Supreme Court of the United States that have decreased the sovereignty of Native American tribes, focusing on 15 cases spanning 170 years which he calls "particularly egregious" decisions. He engages in close textual interpretation of the reasoning that the US Supreme Court invoked in these cases, arguing that the rationale behind major decisions that have diminished the sovereignty of tribes has often been based on debunked racial tropes and inaccurate history. Wilkins argues that the US Supreme Court, because it takes as its starting point the US constitution, is ill-equipped to judge cases based on a pre-constitutional set of nation-to-nation agreements which are already premised on tribal sovereignty.

In 1999, Wilkins published the book The Navajo Political Experience. The book studies the systems that have been developed and used by the Navajo Nation for a variety of legal purposes, forming a distinctive legal framework shaped both by internal factors and by interactions with the United States federal government. By 2013, the book had been published in four editions.

American Indian Politics and the American Political System was released in 2002. The book, which detailed historical context and contemporary issues regarding indigenous systems of governance within the United States, was named an Outstanding Academic Title by Choice Reviews. He wrote a revised edition in 2007, and together with his coauthor Heidi Stark he published a third edition of the book in 2011. Stark and Wilkins also coauthored a fourth edition of the book in 2018.

In 2013, Wilkins published Hollow Justice: A History of Indigenous Claims in the United States. The book follows up on a third planned book in a series of two books written by Wilkins's mentor, Vine Deloria Jr., and Clifford M. Lytle, that the two weren't able to complete. In Hollow Justice Wilkins studies the history of indigenous claims, covering topics like legal activity in the United States Court of Federal Claims and the Indian Claims Commission, the Cobell v. Salazar case, and the continuing prospects for indigenous claims.

In 2018, Wilkins wrote Red Prophet: The Punishing Intellectualism of Vine Deloria, Jr. Wilkins had previously coauthored two books with Vine Deloria Jr.: Tribes, Treaties, and Constitutional Tribulations in 1999, and The Legal Universe: Observations on the Foundations of American Law, which was published in 2011.

With K. Tsianina Lomawaima, Wilkins coauthored Uneven Ground: American Indian Sovereignty and Federal Law in 2001. The book was selected as an Outstanding Academic Title by Choice Reviews, and was included on a list of the 10 most influential books by the Native American and Indigenous Studies Association.

In 2017, with his wife Shelly Hulse Wilkins, a policy analyst specializing in Tribal-state relations, Wilkins wrote Dismembered: Native Disenrollment and the Battle for Human Rights. They co-edited Of Living Stone: Perspectives on Continuous Knowledge and the Work of Vine Deloria, Jr. in 2024. The work contains pieces by artists, activists, and academics who critique Deloria’s wide-ranging intellectual and cultural legacy.

In 2024, Oxford University Press published Indigenous Governance: Clans, Constitutions, and Consent, a comprehensive, critical examination of Native political systems: the senior political sovereigns on the North American continent in terms of their origin, development, structures, and operation.

Wilkins' work has been included on lists of important reading for topics in indigenous legal studies, and he has been described as an icon of Native American civil rights. In 2007 he was awarded the Dean's Medal from the University of Minnesota College of Liberal Arts, and in 2019 he won the Daniel Elazar Distinguished Federalism Scholar Award from the American Political Science Association, which is awarded for "distinguished scholarly contributions to the study of federalism and intergovernmental relations".

== Selected works ==
- Dine' Bibeehaz'aanii: A Handbook of Navajo Government, 1987
- American Indian Sovereignty and the U.S. Supreme Court: The Masking of Justice, 1997
- The Navajo Political Experience, first edition, 1999
- Tribes, Treaties, and Constitutional Tribulations, 2000
- American Indian Politics and the American Political System, first edition, 2002
- Uneven Ground: American Indian Sovereignty and Federal Law, 2002
- Native Voices: American Indian Identity and Resistance, 2003
- On the Drafting of Tribal Constitutions - Felix S. Cohen, 2006
- Documents of Native American Political Development, 1500 to 1933, 2009
- The Legal Universe: Observations of the Foundations of American Law, 2011
- The Hank Adams Reader, 2011
- Hollow Justice: A History of Indigenous Claims in the United States, 2013
- Dismembered: Native Disenrollment and the Battle for Human Rights, 2017
- Red Prophet: The Punishing Intellectualism of Vine Deloria, Jr., 2018
- Documents of Native American Political Development, 1933 to Present, 2019
- Of Living Stone: Perspectives on Continuous Knowledge and the Work of Vine Deloria, Jr., 2024
- Indigenous Governance: Clans, Constitutions, and Consent, 2024
