= Anna Lee Walters =

American novelist

- Born: September 9, 1946 (age 79); Pawnee, Oklahoma
- Writing career
- Notable awards: American Book Award, 1985; Virginia McCormick Scully Award

Anna Lee Walters (born September 9, 1946) is a Pawnee/Otoe–Missouria author.

== Life and career ==
Walters was born on September 9, 1946, in Pawnee, Oklahoma, to parents Juanita and Luther McGlaslin. Her mother is Pawnee and her father is Otoe-Missouria. Walters obtained her BA from Goddard College in Plainfield, VT, where she also obtained her MFA in Creative Writing. Anna is an instructor in the Humanities Division at Diné College in Arizona where she has experience as an administrator and teacher, and as a publisher of educational and trade publications with Navajo Community College Press. She lives in Tsaile, Arizona with her husband Harry Walters. He is the former Director of the Museum at Diné College.

Walters' first novel, Ghost Singer (1988) was published just two years before the passing of the Native American Graves Protection and Repatriation Act (NAGPRA) and one year before the National Museum of the American Indian Act. This is important to note because the novel centers around a collection of Native American remains and artifacts housed in the Smithsonian and the subsequent effects the collection has on both native and non-native characters. The novel also explores how American Indians understand their position related to their ancestry and culture, especially in relation to the diaspora created by colonization.

Her short story collection, The Sun Is Not Merciful, won the Before Columbus Foundation 1985 American Book Award and the Virginia McCormick Scully Award.

== Publications ==
=== Books ===
- The Sacred: Ways of Knowledge. Sources of Life, (With Peggy V. Beck and Nia Francisco.), Tsaile, Arizona: Navajo Community College Press
- The Otoe-Missouria Tribe. Centennial Memoirs. 1881-1981, Red Rock, Oklahoma: Otoe- Missouria Tribe, 1981.
- The Sun Is Not Merciful, Firebrand Books.
- Ghost Singer, Northland Publishing.
- The Spirit of Native America: Beauty and Mysticism in American Indian Art, Chronicle Books.
- Talking Indian: Reflections on Survival and Writing, Firebrand Books.
- Neon Pow-Wow: New Native American Voices of the Southwest, as Editor, Northland Publishing.
- The Two-Legged Creature. An Otoe Story Retold, Northland Publishing. [Children's book]
- The Pawnee Nation, Bridgestone Books.

=== Anthologies ===
- Stories for a Winter's Night: Short Fiction by Native American Writers, Maurice Kenny (Editor), White Pine Press.
- American Family Album: 28 Contemporary Ethnic Stories, Bonnie Tusmith and Gerald Bergion (Editors), Harcourt College Pub.
- Reinventing the Enemy's Language: Contemporary Native Women's Writing of North America, Joy Harjo and Gloria Bird (editors), W.W. Norton.
- Spider Woman's Granddaughters: Traditional Tales and Contemporary Writing by Native American Women, Paula Gunn Allen (Editor), Fawcett Books
- Tapestries of Life : Women's Work, Women's Consciousness, and the Meaning of Daily Experience, Bettina Aptheker (Editor), Univ. of Massachusetts Press.
- Walking the Twilight II: Women Writers of the Southwest, Kathryn Wilder (Editor), Northland Pub.
- Smoke Rising: The Native North American Literary Companion, Janet Witalec, Visible Ink Press.
- A Gathering of Spirit: A Collection by North American Indian Women, Beth Brant (Editor), Firebrand Books
- Earth Power Coming : Short Fiction in Native American Literature, Simon J. Ortiz (editor), Navajo Community College Press
- The Remembered Earth: An Anthology of Contemporary Native American Literature, Geary Hobson (Editor), Univ of New Mexico Press
- Talking Leaves: Contemporary Native American Short Stories, Craig Lesley, Katheryn Stavrakis (Editor) Dell Books
- The Man to Send Rainclouds. Contemporary Stories by American Indians, Kenneth Rosen (Editor), Viking Press.
- Voices of the Rainbow: Contemporary Poetry by Native Americans, Kenneth Rosen (Editor), R.C. Gorman, Aaron Yava (Illustrator), Arcade Pub.
- Gatherings, Survival, Vol. I, Greg Young-Ing (Editor), 1990, Penticton: Theytus Books
- Coyote was here : essays on contemporary Native American literary and political mobilization, Bo Scholer (Editor), 1984, Aarhus, Denmark : Seklos.
- The Third Woman: Minority Women Writers of the United States, Dexter Fisher (Editor), Houghton Mifflin Co.
- First Skin Around Me: contemporary American tribal poetry, James L. White (Editor), Territorial Press.

=== Journals ===
- Indian Market Magazine, 1999 Collector's Edition.
- Journal of Navajo, Spring 1994, Vol. XI, No. 3.
- Journal of the Southwest, Vol. 32, No. 1, Spring 1990.
- Christianity and Crisis, Vol. 48, No. 18, Dec 1988 and Vol. 49, No. 19, Jan 1990.
- Akwekon, No. 5, April 1986.
- Tarasque II, 1985.
- North Dakota Quarterly, Vol. 53, No. 3, Spring 1985.
- Frontiers: a Journal of Women's Studies, Vol. VII, No. 3, Fall 1981.
- Book Forum, (American Indians Today, Their Thought, Their Literature, Their Art), Vol. V, No. 3, 1981.
- Scree, 11–12, Native American Issue, (Duck Down Press) 1979.
- Frauenoffensive, Special Native American Issue, as Guest Editor, No. 8, Oct. 1977 (German language).
- The Indian Historian, Vol. 10, No. 4, Fall 1977.
- Shantih, (Special International Women's Issue), Fall/Winter, Vol. 3, No. 3, 1976.

=== Interviews, autobiographical essays and critical work ===
- Here First: Autobiographical Essays by Native American Writers, Arnold Krupat (Editor), Brian Swann (Editor), Random House
- Contemporary American Indian Literatures & the Oral Tradition, Susan Berry Brill De Ramirez, 1999, University of Arizona Press.
- Native Heritage: Personal Accounts by American Indians, 1790 to the Present, Arlene Hirschfelder (Editor), Macmillan General Reference.
- Growing Up Native American, Patricia Riley (Editor), Avon Books.
- Wildfire, Volume 4 Number 3.
- The American Indian Quarterly, Volume XVI, Number 1 (Winter)
- Western American Literature, Vol. XXIX No. 4: 376.
- Avante Garde (radio aired 1/8/90) WCVT 89.7, Towson, Towson State University (Boston)
- Native America Calling. (Radio) Book of the Month Club: Anna Lee Walters 28 Aug. 95. Public Radio
- Survival This Way : Interviews With American Indian Poets, Joseph Bruchac III (Editor), (Sun Tracks Books, No 15) University of Arizona Press

=== Textbooks ===
- How We Live Now: Contemporary Multicultural Literature, John Repp (Editor), St. Martin's Press, 1993.
- Language, Scott Foresman, 1989.
- The Native Americans: An Illustrated History, David Hurst Thomas (Editor), Turner Publishing Inc. 1995.
- Plains Native American Literature, Globe Book Co. 1992.
- Teaching and Using Multicultural Literature in Grades 9-12: Moving Beyond the Canon, Arlette Willis (Editor), Christopher-Gordon Pub. 1998.

=== Work published in translation ===
- Figlie Di Pocahontas: Racconti e poesie Delle Indiane d'America, Laura Coltelli, Dr. Cinzia Biagotti (Editors), Giunti Gruppo Editoriale, Publisher, Firenze, Italy.
- Piste Perdute, Piste Ritrovate: Racconti Indiani, Franco Melli, Milano (Italy), 1996.

== See also ==
- List of Native American writers
