= Margaret Archuleta =

American curator from New Mexico

- Born: October 2, 1950; Albuquerque, New Mexico
- Died: March 26, 2023 (aged 72); Albuquerque, New Mexico
- Citizenship: United States
- Education: University of California, Berkeley (bachelor's), University of California, Los Angeles (master's)
- Occupations: educator, curator
- Known for: curation, writing

Margaret L. Archuleta (November 2, 1950 – March 26, 2023) was a Tewa / Hispanic curator.

== Education ==
Margaret Archuleta completed a BA at University of California, Berkeley and an MA at University of California, Los Angeles. Her thesis exhibition was on the paintings of Harry Fonseca, Coyote: A Myth in the Making. The exhibition was first hosted at the Oakland Museum, then the Natural History Museum of Los Angeles and the Smithsonian National Museum of Natural History.

== Career ==
Margaret Archuleta joined the Heard Museum as Associate Curator of Fine Art in 1987 and quickly became a full curator. From 1987 to 2002, she curated the Heard's Biennial of Native American Fine Arts Invitational, which raised the profile of several now renowned Native artists, including John Hoover, Kay WalkingStick, Nora Naranjo Morse, Anita Fields, and Jaune Quick-to-See Smith. She also made strategic acquisitions from Invitational artists, strengthening the Heard's collection. In 1993, with the co-operation of collector Rennard Strickland, Archuleta organized the exhibition and publication, Shared Visions: Native American Painters and Sculptors in the Twentieth Century. It was recognized as the most comprehensive survey of postwar Native American artists to date. The exhibition travelled internationally to Canada and New Zealand as well as to the Smithsonian in Washington, DC. In 1997, Archuleta brought an exhibition to the White House, Twentieth Century American Sculptors at the White House: Honoring Native America. The publication included an essay by Archuleta and an introduction by First Lady Hillary Clinton.

Archuleta also addressed the history of American Indian Boarding Schools, also known as Residential Schools in the exhibition and publication, Away From Home: American Indian Boarding School Experiences, 1879–2000. After five years of research, the exhibition opened at the Heard Museum in November 2000 and travelled in the United States and abroad. This was the first major monograph exhibition in the English-speaking world to directly address this complex history. As the Heard Museum's most successful and long-running exhibition, it was updated in the 2010s and continues to educate new audiences about the history of American Indian Boarding Schools.

Archuleta was a member of the Native Advisory Council for the Eiteljorg Museum of American Indians and Western Art in Indianapolis and a key supporter and juror of the museum's Contemporary Art Fellowship, which also raised the profiles of Native American artists, including Holly Wilson, Meryl McMaster, and Wendy Red Star. She was also a co-organizer for the inaugural Indigenous art residency at the Banff Centre for Arts and Creativity, Alberta (2003). Titled, "Communion and Other Conversations," Archuleta helped direct the program with Brenda Croft, Megan Tamati-Quennell, and Lee-Ann Martin.

Margaret returned to New Mexico in 2003 as Director of the Institute of American Indian Arts Museum (now the IAIA Museum of Contemporary Native Arts), a position she held until 2004. She continued to work internationally, supporting Native artists across the continent through exhibitions, juries, and scholarship. Her unpublished doctoral dissertation, What Does Federal Indian Law Have To Do With Native American Art?, focuses on the resilience of Native women artists, beginning with a case study on Pablita Velarde.
