= Native American studies =

Interdisciplinary academic field

Native American studies is an interdisciplinary academic field that examines the history, culture, politics, issues, spirituality, sociology and contemporary experience of Indigenous peoples of the Americas. Native American Studies is also called American Indian, Indigenous American, Aboriginal, Native, or First Nations studies.

Increasingly, debate has focused on the differences rather than the similarities between other ethnic studies disciplines such as African American studies, Asian American studies, and Latine studies. In particular, the political sovereignty of many Indigenous peoples marks substantive differences in historical experience from that of other racial and ethnic groups in the United States and Canada. Drawing from numerous disciplines such as anthropology, sociology, history, literature, political science, and gender studies, Native American studies scholars consider a variety of perspectives and employ diverse analytical and methodological tools in their work.

Two key concepts shape Native American studies, according to Elizabeth Cook-Lynn (Crow Creek Lakota), Indigeneity (as defined in culture, geography, and philosophy) and sovereignty (as legally and historically defined). Practitioners advocate for decolonization of Indigenous peoples, political autonomy, and the establishment of a discipline dedicated to alleviating contemporary problems facing Indigenous peoples.

== History ==
The Native American historical experience is marked by forcible and sometimes cooperative attempts at assimilation into mainstream European-American culture (Americanization). Beginning with missionaries and leading up to federally controlled schools, the aim was to educate American Indians so that they could return to their communities and facilitate cultural assimilation. As described by David Beck in his article "American Indian Higher Education before 1974: From Colonization to Self-Determination", the schools were a tool for assimilation. Their focus was not academic, but training for industrial or domestic jobs.

The Civil Rights Movement of the 1950s–60s contested mainstream methods of assimilationist indoctrination and the curriculum in K-12 schools and universities throughout the United States. American Indian students, coupled with sympathetic professors, assisted in creating programs with new goals. Rather than being focused on education for community assimilation there was a move to educate for empowerment. Programs that practiced community outreach and focused on student retention on campus arose from that movement. The school programs fostered a new interpretation of American Indian history, sociology, and politics.

During the First Convocation of American Indian Scholars in March 1970 at Princeton University, Indigenous scholars drafted a plan to develop "Native American Studies as an Academic Discipline", which would defend Indigenous control of land and Indigenous rights and would ultimately reform US Indian Policy. This discipline would be informed by traditional knowledge, especially oral history, and would "defend [I]ndigenous nationhood in America".

In contrast to Western anthropology, the knowledge base of Native American studies is endogenous, emerging from Indigenous communities. Developers of Native American studies widely dismissed scientific objectivity, since Western cultural biases have historically informed anthropology and other disciplines.

=== Discourse about diversity and decolonization ===
Since the inception of Native American Studies, there’s been discourse on the question of who should study and contribute to the field of Native Americans Studies. These fundamental questions range from who can study Native American Studies in undergraduate courses to how academics of non-Indian descent dominate Native American Studies and surrounding discourse.

Linda Tuhiwai Smith is a professor of education and Maori development and Pro-Vice-Chancellor Maori at the University of Waikato in Hamilton, New Zealand. Smith explains that the word "research" is linked to European colonialism. Indigenous peoples are apprehensive and cautious of that connection, and the pursuit of knowledge, or research, is deeply embedded in multiple layers of European and Colonial processes. Colonial definitions and understandings of Native peoples were reported to the West, and then those representations were sent back and attached to Indigenous identity. In this way, research is very powerful. Indigenous researchers must be afforded the opportunity to critique and fine-tune the methodologies so that their experiences are more accurately represented.

== Universities and colleges with Native American studies departments, programs, and courses ==
United States
- Amherst College (Amherst, MA)
- Blackfeet Community College (Browning, MT)
- College of Menominee Nation (Keshena, WI)
- Dartmouth College (Hanover, NH)
- Fort Lewis College (Durango, CO)
- Haskell Indian Nations University (Lawrence, KS)
- Haskell Indian Nations University (Lawrence, KS)
- Hampshire College (Amherst, MA)
- Montana State University (Bozeman, MT)
- Montclair State University (Montclair, NJ)
- Mount Holyoke College (South Hadley, MA)
- Northern Arizona University (Flagstaff, AZ)
- Northwest Indian College (Bellingham, WA)
- Navajo Technical University (Crownpoint, NM)
- Salish Kootenai College (Pablo, MT)
- San Diego State University (San Diego, CA)
- Sitting Bull College (Fort Yates, ND)
- Smith College (Northampton, MA)
- Southwestern Community College (Sylva, NC)
- Southwestern Indian Polytechnic Institute (Albuquerque, NM)
- United Tribes Technical College (Bismarck, ND)
- University of Alaska Fairbanks (Fairbanks, AK)
- University of Arizona (Tucson, AZ)
- University of California, Berkeley (Berkeley, CA)
- University of California, Davis (Davis, CA)
- University of California, Los Angeles (Los Angeles, CA)
- University of California, Riverside (Riverside, CA)
- University of California, Santa Cruz (Santa Cruz, CA)
- University of Hawaii at Manoa (Honolulu, HI)
- University of Kansas (Lawrence, KS)
- University of Massachusetts, Amherst (Amherst, MA)
- University of Massachusetts, Boston (Boston, MA)
- University of Minnesota (Minneapolis, MN)
- University of Montana (Missoula, MT)
- University of New Mexico (Albuquerque, NM)
- University of North Carolina at Pembroke (Pembroke, NC)
- University of North Dakota (Grand Forks, ND)
- University of Oklahoma (Norman, OK)
- University of Utah (Salt Lake City, UT)
- University of Washington (Seattle, WA)
- University of Wisconsin-Madison (Madison, WI)

Canada

- Carleton University (Ottawa, Ontario)
- McGill University (Montreal, Quebec)
- Simon Fraser University (Burnaby, British Columbia)
- University of Alberta (Edmonton, Alberta)
- University of British Columbia (Vancouver, British Columbia)
- University of Calgary (Calgary, Alberta)
- University of Manitoba (Winnipeg, Manitoba)
- University of Saskatchewan (Saskatoon, Saskatchewan)
- University of Toronto (Toronto, Ontario)
- University of Victoria (Victoria, British Columbia)
- University of Winnipeg (Winnipeg, Manitoba)

Europe

- Leiden University (Leiden, Netherlands)
- University of Aberdeen (Aberdeen, Scotland)
- University of Bern (Bern, Switzerland)
- University of Cologne (Cologne, Germany)
- University of Copenhagen (Copenhagen, Denmark)
- University of East Anglia (Norwich, England)
- University of Edinburgh (Edinburgh, Scotland)
- University of Exeter (Exeter, England)
- University of Helsinki (Helsinki, Finland)
- University of Osnabrück (Osnabrück, Germany)
- University of St. Andrews (St. Andrews, Scotland)
- University of Tromsø (Tromsø, Norway)

== Publications ==
- Decolonization Indigeneity, Education & Society
- Wíčazo Ša Review
- American Indian Quarterly
- American Indian Culture and Research Journal
- Canadian Journal of Native Studies
- The NAIS Journal
- Native South
- Native Studies Review
- Studies in American Indian Literatures (SAIL)
- Transmotion
- Yellow Medicine Review

== Conferences and symposia ==
- Native American and Indigenous Studies Association (NAISA)
- American Indian Studies Conference
- Native American Art Studies Association, biannual
- Native American Literature Symposium
- Native American Symposium, Southeastern Oklahoma State University, biannual
- Symposium on the American Indian, Northeastern State University

== Notable scholars ==
- Taiaiake Alfred (Kahnawake Mohawk)
- Paula Gunn Allen (Laguna Pueblo/Sioux)
- Cutcha Risling Baldy (Hupa/Yurok/Karuk)
- Greg Cajete (Santa Clara Pueblo)
- Dean Chavers (Lumbee)
- Brenda Child (Red Lake Ojibwe)
- Allison Hedge Coke
- Elizabeth Cook-Lynn (Crow Creek Sioux)
- Philip S. Deloria (Standing Rock Sioux)
- Vine Deloria, Jr. (Standing Rock Sioux)
- Raymond DeMallie
- Jack D. Forbes
- Daniel Heath Justice (Cherokee Nation)
- Trudie Lamb-Richmond (Schaghticoke)
- Stacy Leeds (Cherokee Nation)
- Devon A. Mihesuah (Choctaw Nation)
- Jean O'Brien (White Earth Ojibwe)
- Simon J. Ortiz (Acoma Pueblo)
- Luana Ross (Salish and Kootenai)
- Greg Sarris (Federated Indians of Graton Rancheria)
- Audra Simpson (Mohawk)
- James Thomas Stevens (Mohawk)
- Charlene Teters (Spokane Tribe)
- Gerald Vizenor (White Earth Anishinaabe)
- David E. Wilkins (Lumbee)
- Robert A. Williams Jr. (Lumbee)
- Craig Womack
- Alfred Young Man (Rocky Boy Chippewa-Cree)

== See also ==
- Center for World Indigenous Studies
- Cultural studies
- Diné College Press
- Indian Country Today
- Indigenous Law Centre
- Postcolonialism
