= Native American literature =

Native American literature encompasses both oral and written works produced by Native Americans in the United States (distinct from Indigenous First Nations writers in Canada), from pre-Columbian times through to today. Famous authors include N. Scott Momaday, Leslie Marmon Silko, Simon Ortiz, Louise Erdrich, Gerald Vizenor, Joy Harjo, Sherman Alexie, D'Arcy McNickle, James Welch, Charles Eastman, Mourning Dove, Zitkala-Sa, John Rollin Ridge, Lynn Riggs, Hanay Geiogamah, William Apess, Samson Occom, Tommy Orange, and Stephen Graham Jones. Importantly, it is not "a" literature, but a set of literatures, since every tribe has its own unique cultural traditions. Since the 1960s, it has also become a significant field of literary studies, with academic journals, departments, and conferences devoted to the subject.

== Oral traditions ==
Native American literature arises from a rich set of oral traditions predating European contact and, in form, distinct from European writing. Oral traditions include narrative storytelling, ritual songs, chants, and poetry. Many of these stories and songs were transcribed by anthropologists, which often led to conflict with tribes and misinterpretation or mistranslation.

== Early literature ==
Many early Native American writers combined autobiography and political argument to persuade readers to advocate for better treatment of their communities. Samson Occom (Mohegan), a Christian preacher, wrote both his autobiography, A Short Narrative of My Life and many hymns. William Apess (Pequot) also published an autobiography, A Son of the Forest, and a public lecture about and eulogy of King Philip. Sarah Winnemucca (Northern Paiute) wrote about her tribe's first interactions with European Americans in Life Among the Piutes. Simon Pokagon (Potawatomi, c. 1830–1899) wrote The Red Man's Rebuke and distributed it at the 1893 World's Columbian Exposition.

John Rollin Ridge (Cherokee) wrote what is considered the first novel by a Native American, The Life and Adventures of Joaquín Murieta, about the infamous California bandit.

In the early 20th century, as white American audiences became interested in reading about the lives and cultures of Native Americans, Native American writers began transcribing the stories of their cultures, such as Charles Eastman's Old Indian Days and Mourning Dove's Coyote Tales. Others began to write fiction, for example, Mourning Dove's novel Cogewea and D'Arcy McNickle's The Surrounded. Other novelists include John Joseph Mathews and John Milton Oskison. Perhaps the best known Native American work from this period is Green Grow the Lilacs, a play by Cherokee author Lynn Riggs that became the basis for the musical Oklahoma! Many of these authors blended autobiography, traditional stories, fiction, and essays, as can be seen in Zitkala-Sa's (Dakota) American Indian Stories.

== Native American Renaissance ==
The term "Native American Renaissance" was coined in 1983 by Kenneth Lincoln to describe the flowering of literary work by Native American writers in the late 1960s through the 1970s and into the 1980s. A landmark came in 1969 when N. Scott Momaday (Kiowa)’s novel House Made of Dawn became the first Pulitzer Prize–winning work by a Native author.”

The 1970s saw important fiction by James Welch (Blackfeet and A-aninin), Leslie Marmon Silko (Laguna descent), and Gerald Vizenor (Chippewa), and poetry by Joy Harjo (Muscogee), Simon J. Ortiz (Acoma), and Wendy Rose (Hopi/Miwok). Many authors have done significant work in both genres, such as Joseph Bruchac (Abenaki).

The 1980s saw many of the writers listed above continuing to produce new literature. New voices included Louise Erdrich (Ojibwe), Paula Gunn Allen (Laguna), Linda Hogan (Chickasaw), Michael Dorris, and Luci Tapahonso (Navajo).

The 1990s introduced several works of poetry and of prose fiction by Spokane/Coeur D'Alene author Sherman Alexie. Chickasaw author Linda Hogan's Mean Spirit was a finalist for the 1991 Pulitzer Prize for Fiction.

== 21st-century literature ==
Joy Harjo (Muscogee Nation) became the first Native American U.S. Poet Laureate in April 2019, and in the same year Tommy Orange’s There There was a finalist for the Pulitzer Prize for Fiction. In 2021, Louise Erdrich won the a Pulitzer Prize for Fiction for The Night Watchman.

== Themes and threads ==
- The writer as a narrator more than an author (based off of oral traditions)
- Time and space being non-linear
- Collective spirit with characters being one with their community and environment
- Trickster-like characters
- Universal language to speak to multiple ethnic audiences
- Trauma and Healing
- Mixed-bloods
- Ceremonies

== See also ==
- American Indian literary nationalism
- Native American Renaissance
- Studies in American Indian Literatures
- Native American Literature Symposium
- Wordcraft Circle of Native Writers and Storytellers
- List of writers from peoples indigenous to the Americas
- Native American studies
- List of Native American languages in the United States
- American Indian English
- Urban Indian
- American literature

== External sources ==
- Articles on Native American writers in Western American Literature
- Native? Or, not? A Resource List, by Debbie Reese (Nambé Pueblo), American Indians in Children's Literature
