= The United States elevated to Glory and Honor =

The United States elevated to Glory and Honor is a book by Ezra Stiles, published in 1783.

The book is a transcript of a sermon given to Jonathan Trumbull and the Connecticut General Assembly, on May 8, 1783. At the time, Stiles was the President of Yale College and a Congregationalist minister.

== Synopsis ==
The sermon draws parallels between the United States and the Biblical nation of Israel. Stiles refers to the US as an "American Israel, high above all nations which He hath made, in numbers, and in praise, and in name, and in honor", suggesting that the White Americans are like the Chosen People of Israel. He opined that the number of Indians and Africans in the country would go down and that "Slavery may ... in God’s good providence ... be abolished and cease in the land of liberty.".

The sermon ran for 30,000 words (100 pages) and would have taken more than two hours to deliver.

He believed that according to the Bible, obedience to God was required for national happiness and prosperity. He summed up his sermon by stating "Holiness ought to be the end of all civil government.".

== Update ==
Three years after the speech, Stiles sent a second, corrected version of the sermon to George Washington.

== See also ==
- Ezra Stiles
- Haim Isaac Carigal
- Jacob's Pillow-Pillar Stone
- Stone of Scone
- British Israelism
- Lost Ten Tribes
