= Don Coyhis =

Native American addiction counselor

Don Lawrence Coyhis (born August 16, 1943) is an alcohol and addiction recovery counselor known for designing treatment programs primarily for Native Americans. He is the founder and president of White Bison, Inc., a non-profit charitable organization devoted to assisting Native Americans who are affected by substance use disorders. In 1994 Coyhis started the Wellbriety Movement which aims to reduce substance abuse among Native Americans.

== Biography ==
Coyhis is a Mohican Indian born and raised on the Stockbridge-Munsee Reservation in Wisconsin. Both of his parents were survivors of American Indian boarding schools, an experience that left them so traumatized that they had difficulty showing affection. Coyhis grew up "a troubled child to troubled parents...Drinking was the way of life."

As an adult, Coyhis left the reservation and in 1978 went to work for the Digital Equipment Corporation in Colorado Springs, eventually becoming senior manager. He designed and taught programs on leadership and diversity. His clients included AT&T, Lucent Technologies, the U.S. Forest Service, and the Bureau of Land Management. After having struggled with alcoholism for many years, drinking threatened his career and Coyhis became sober in 1978. He joined Alcoholics Anonymous where he sponsored several "difficult cases," finding satisfaction in the challenge they presented, but wondering if he could do more.

Coyhis felt out of touch with his recovery group and suspected that other Native Americans felt the same. In 1988 he was invited by another Indian to go on a five-day fast in the Rampart Range mountains. There he had a vision of a white bison, which inspired him to help other Native Americans quit drinking. In 1990 he began doing sobriety workshops in the Idaho prison system, then quit his job in 1992 to devote his life to helping others recover from alcoholism, founding White Bison, Inc., a nonprofit charitable organization.

== Wellbriety Movement ==
In 1994 he obtained a small grant to work with Native Americans in Maine. He began meeting with Elders and other people in Passamaquoddy community. As part of their work they began working with the metaphor of the Sacred Hoop. Elders explained that the Sacred Hoop has the power to confer four gifts: forgiveness, unity, healing and hope. Coyhis then decided to take the Hoop to other Native American communities, making the first Hoop journey to 35 Native American colleges in 1999. He made ten journeys with the Hoop, logging hundreds of thousands of miles each year in an effort to bring the "Wellbriety Movement" to 100 Native communities by the year 2010. Before receiving a sustained commitment for support from White Bison, Native communities have to demonstrate a commitment to recovery by declaring a collective desire to break entrenched patterns of passivity, helplessness, and hopelessness. Once significant progress has been achieved, a community is awarded a handmade "big drum" as a sign of respect.

=== Firestarters ===
On the Hoop journeys Coyhis recruited people recovering from alcohol dependence to act as "firestarters," leaders of Native American recovery and support groups. Firestarters may choose to lead recovery groups for men, women, Al-Anon (support for friends and relatives of alcoholics), addictions prevention and wellness for Native American boys ages 13 to 17 or for Native American girls ages 8 to 17, support for family healing, or for children of alcoholics.

=== The role of community and culture in recovery ===
The term "wellbriety" is derived from a Passamaquoddy word that means to be both sober and well. According to Coyhis, "It means going beyond survival to thrive in one’s own life and in the life of the community. It means living by the laws and values of traditional Native American culture." Coyhis believes that it is not enough to put an individual into rehab or a recovery group to treat alcohol or drug dependence:

"We must actively heal the community and its institutions at the same time an individual works on his or her own healing from alcohol or drugs or other unwell behaviors. The individual affects the community and the community affects the individual. They are inseparable from the point of view of addiction recovery. Everything must be in the healing process simultaneously."

Coyhis also feels that historical and intergenerational trauma are responsible for much of the substance use seen among Native Americans. He argues that restoring cultural identity by returning to the principles, laws, and values of traditional Native culture promotes healing mentally, physically, emotionally and spiritually. Coyhis acknowledges that each individual needs to work hard to overcome drug and alcohol dependence, but cautions that a healthy sociocultural environment makes the healing process less painful and more likely to succeed. He frames this concept in terms of the "healing forest," wherein a sick tree can only recover if the rest of the forest is healthy. This holistic approach represents a conceptual breakthrough by emphasizing the role of the community in recovery.

=== Expanded mission ===
Coyhis studied the underlying causes of alcoholism, then decided to expand White Bison's mission to include drug addiction, dysfunctional families and relationships, as well as suicide. Coyhis’ model, known as the "Medicine Wheel 12-Step," uses a twelve-step program similar to that used by Alcoholics Anonymous, but it also incorporates cultural elements, including a medicine wheel, group drum circles, songs, healing ceremonies, the teachings of elders, and it does not use the AA model of anonymity. In 2005 Coyhis launched Warrior Down, a program that supports re-entry for Native Americans using a multi-faceted and traditional approach. Through a supportive team of peer support specialists, the program provides resources, programming, recovery support, recidivism prevention, and community referrals for those re-entering the community from treatment or from various forms of incarceration.

In 2001 Coyhis met addiction specialist William L. White and they began collaborating on two books: The Red Road to Wellbriety in the Native American Way, and Alcohol Problems in Native America: The Untold Story of Resistance and Recovery, both of which were published by Coyhis Publishing & Consulting, Inc. in 2006. The Red Road lays out Coyhis' philosophy for a culturally-appropriate treatment paradigm (referred to as the red road) for Native Americans and their families who are affected by substance abuse. Alcohol Problems in Native America examines the history of alcohol and Native Americans, including Native American temperance activists, and analyzes the successes and failures of addiction treatment programs run for and by Native Americans.

In 2009 Coyhis received the Purpose Prize from the John Templeton Foundation with a monetary award of $100,000. The award allowed Coyhis to establish a Wellbriety Training Institute with the aim of bringing Wellbriety programs to all of the 574 federally recognized tribes in the United States.

Coyhis is on the faculty of the Alberta Family Wellness Initiative. He has eight adult children, several of whom are themselves recovering from alcohol dependence.

== Publications ==
- Don Coyhis and White Bison, Inc., The Red Road to Wellbriety in the Native American Way, Colorado Springs, CO: Coyhis Publishing & Consulting, Inc., 2006 ISBN 0971990409
- Don L. Coyhis, Understanding Native American Culture: Insights for Recovery Professionals and Other Wellness Practitioners, Coyhis Publishing & Consulting, Inc., 2nd edition, 2009 ISBN 1607259435
- Don L. Coyhis, Meditations with Native American Elders: The Four Seasons, Coyhis Publishing & Consulting, Inc. 2007 ISBN 1605304514
- Don L. Coyhis and William L. White, Alcohol Problems in Native America: The Untold Story of Resistance and Recovery, Colorado Springs, CO: Coyhis Publishing & Consulting, Inc., 2006
- Moore, D., and Coyhis, D. 2010 "The Multicultural Wellbriety Peer Recovery Support Program: Two Decades of Community-Based Recovery," July 2010 Alcoholism Treatment Quarterly 28(3):273-292
- Jan Gryczynski, Jeannette Johnson & Don Coyhis (2007) "The Healing Forest Metaphor Revisited: The Seen and “Unseen World” of Drug Use," Substance Use & Misuse, 42:2-3, 475-484
- Don Coyhis, Richard Simonelli, "Rebuilding Native American Communities," Child Welfare, Vol. 84, No. 2, March/April 2005
- Don L. Coyhis, The Wellbriety Movement Comes of Age: The Fulfillment of Prophecy, Colorado Springs, CO: Coyhis Publishing & Consulting, Inc., 2011

== See also ==
- Alcohol and Native Americans
- The red road
- Native American temperance activists
- William L. White
