= Raphael Hayyim Isaac Carregal =

18th century Palestinian rabbi

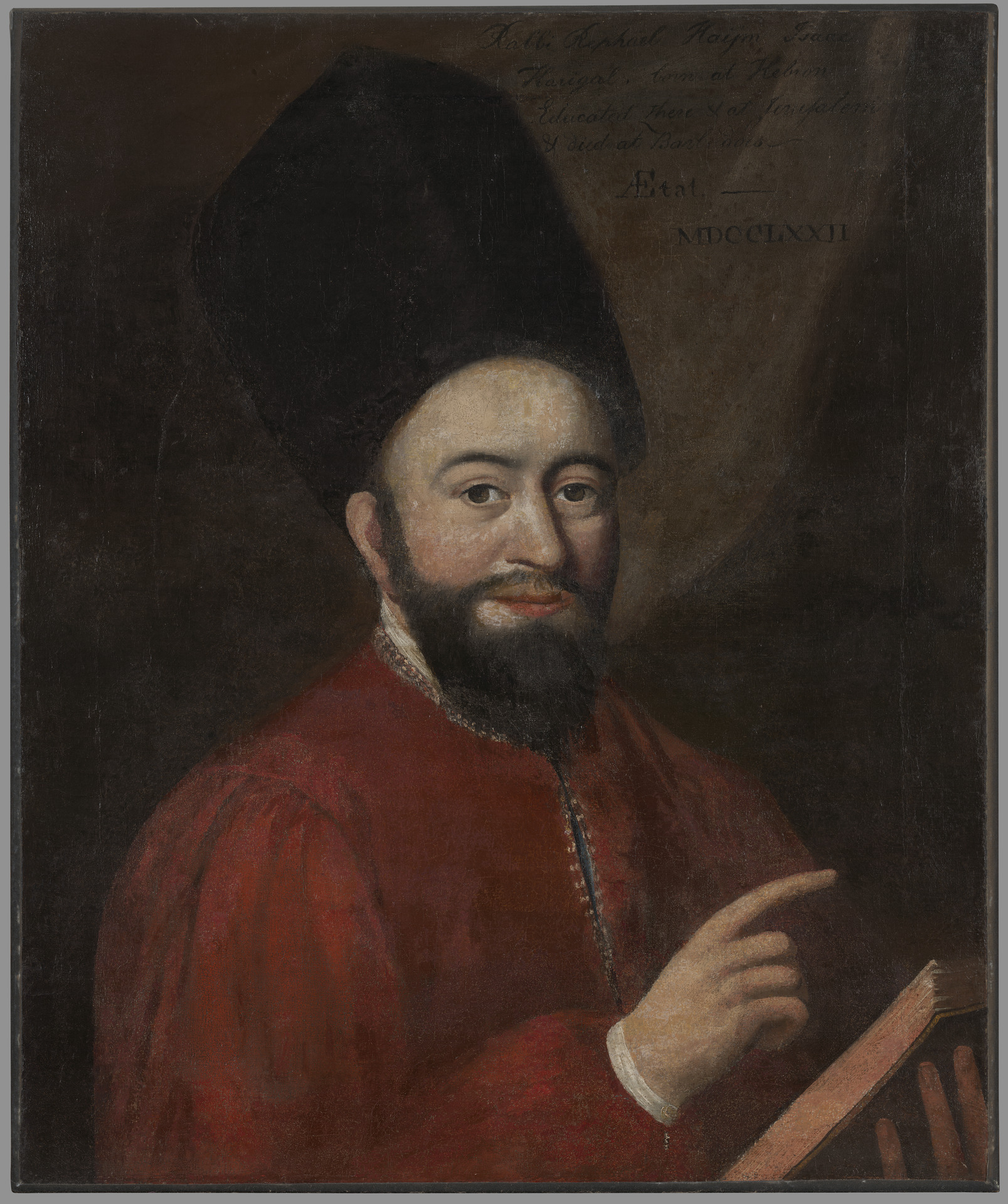
- Rabbi Raphael Hayyim Isaac Carregal

Personal life
- Born: October 15, 1733 Hebron, Damascus Eyalet (Ottoman Syria), Ottoman Empire
- Died: May 5, 1777 (aged 43) Barbados, British Empire

Religious life
- Religion: Judaism

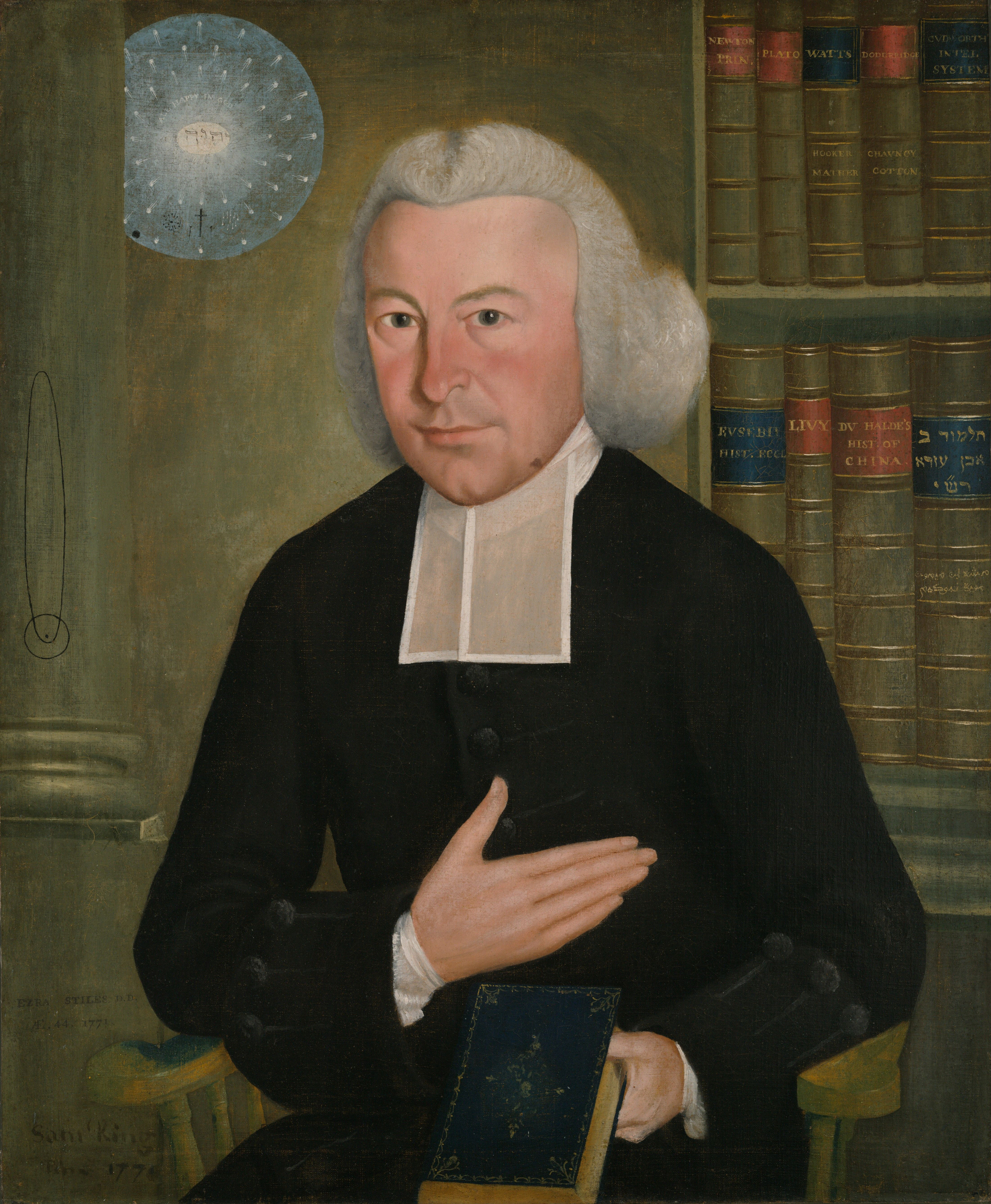
Portrait of Ezra Stiles by Samuel King. Note the Hebrew Tetragrammaton in the blue circle on the wall to the left, and a book on the shelf with the Hebrew words "Talmud B", "Ibn Ezra", and "Rashi".

Raphael Hayyim Isaac Carregal (Note: Also spelt: Carigal, Carrigal, Karigal, Karigel, Karigol, Kargol, Kragol.) (October 15, 1733, Hebron, Ottoman Empire – May 19, 1777, Barbados) was an itinerant Palestinian rabbi and preacher. He is the first rabbi known to have visited the colonies that became the United States.

== Biography ==
Carregal refers to David Melammed as his teacher. He was an ordained rabbi at the age of seventeen, and in 1754 set out on a series of voyages, usually remaining a brief time in the places he visited; e.g., two years in Constantinople (1754–56); two years in Curaçao, (1761–63); four years in Hebron (1764–68); two and a half years in London (1768–71); one year in Jamaica (1771–72); and one year in the British colonies of North America (1772–73). On July 21, 1773, he sailed for Suriname, and in 1775 he was at Barbados. In London, according to his own statement, he was teacher at the Bet ha-midrash, earning a salary of £100 per annum (equivalent to £14,000 in 2025). At Curaçao, he appears to have held the office of rabbi, though no record of his incumbency is to be found in local annals. He spent some time in New York City and Philadelphia, and sojourned in Newport, Rhode Island (March–July 1773), as the guest of the community. Though not connected with the congregation, he often officiated at divine service, preaching in Spanish.

While in Newport, Carregal became an intimate friend of Ezra Stiles, afterward president of Yale College. They studied together, discussing the exegesis and interpretation of Messianic passages in the Bible, and corresponded, mostly in Hebrew. The letters still exist among the unpublished Stiles papers in the library of Yale University. Stiles also took advantage of the opportunity to improve his basic skills in the Hebrew language, feeling (as did many scholars of divinity in the period) that this was advantageous for study of the ancient Biblical texts in their original language. Stiles, in his diary, speaks lovingly and admiringly of his Jewish friend; gives a long account of his dress, manner, and personality; and, in a series of entries occupying many pages, draws up a complete memoir of his career in Newport. Stiles commissioned a portrait of Carigal by artist Samuel King for Yale.

Stiles describes Carregal at the March, 1773 Purim service at the Newport synagogue as:

"dressed in a red garment with the usual Phylacteries and habiliments, the white silk Surplice; he wore a high fur cap, had a long beard. He has the appearance of an ingenious and sensible man"

and at the Passover services the next month as wearing:

"On his Head a high Fur Cap, exactly like a Womans Muff, and about 9 or 10 Inches high, the Aperture atop was closed with green cloth",

and singing in a "fine & melodious" voice. Thus impressed by Carregal, Stiles invited him and Aaron Lopez, a respected local Jewish merchant, to his home on March 30, 1773. The two immediately hit it off; according to Stiles' records they met 28 times before Carregal's departure six months later, to discuss a wide variety of topics ranging from the politics of the Holy Land to the mysticism of the Kabbalah. Carregal also tutored Stiles in the Hebrew language, to the point that they corresponded extensively in Hebrew after Carregal's departure.

Carregal appears to have written only two brochures (both sermons), published in Newport in 1773. The published sermons are the first Jewish sermons published in the United States.

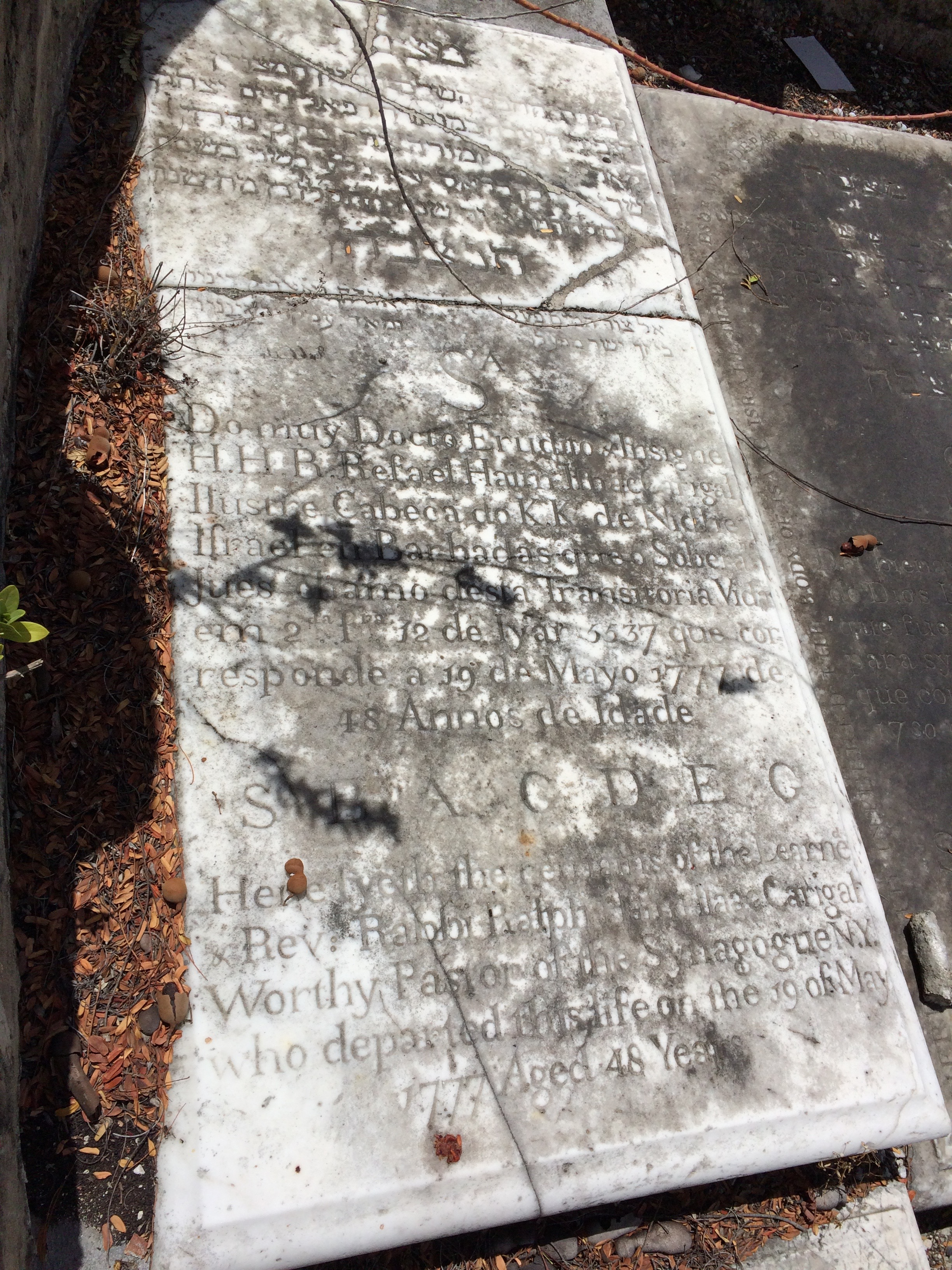
Carregal's gravestone in the Nidhe Israel Cemetery

Carregal died in Barbados on May 19, 1777, and his trilingual gravestone still survives in the Nidhe Israel cemetery. Elias Daniels reported in 1872 that "He remembered to have seen on the Stone several designs representing the Haham as a Baal Tekihu", but only inscriptions remain.
