= William Apess =

Pequot author and Methodist preacher (1798–1839)

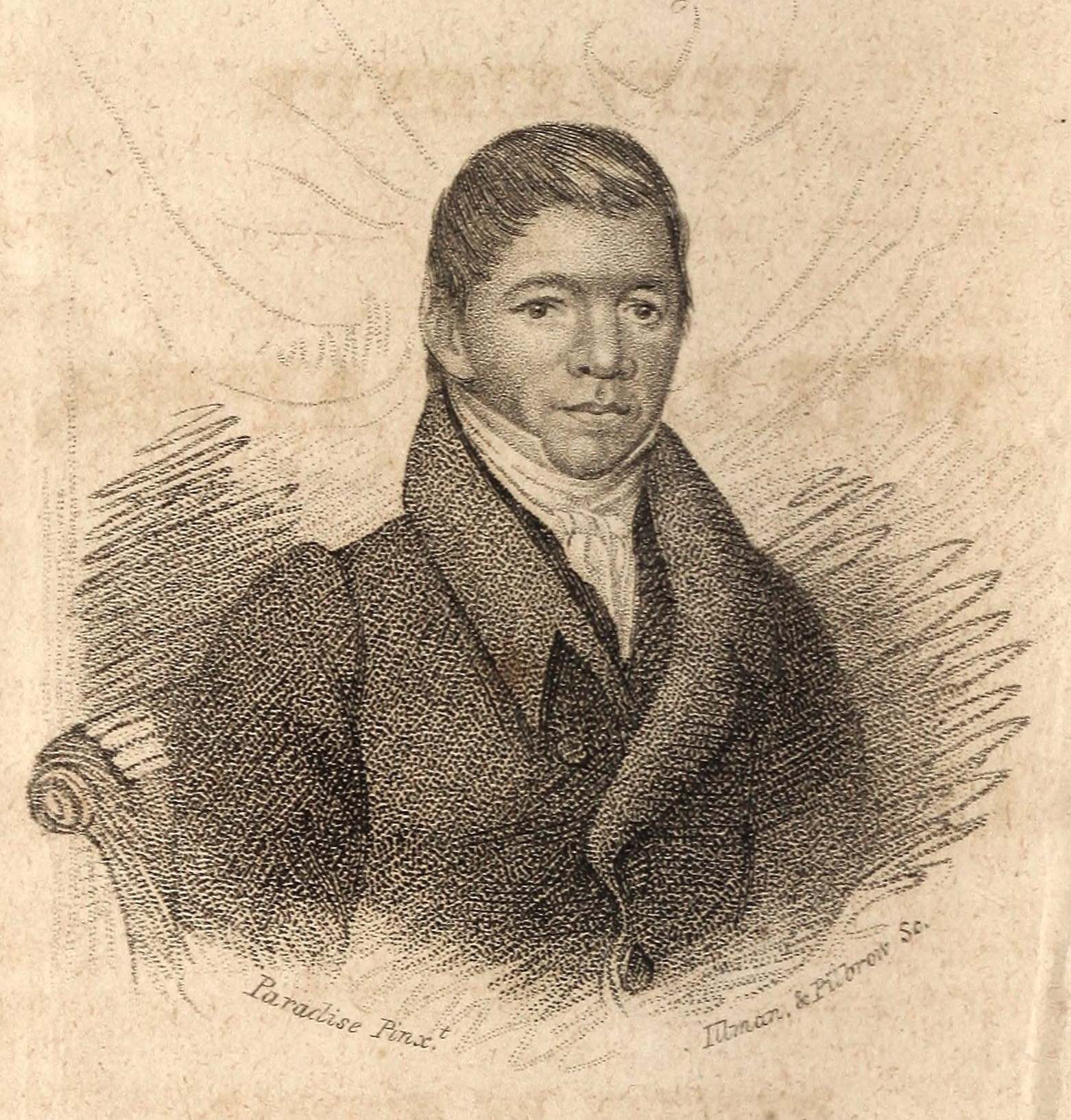
- Born: 1798; Colrain, Massachusetts, U.S.
- Died: April 10, 1839 (aged 40–41); New York City, New York, U.S.

William Apess (1798–1839, Pequot) (also known as William Apes before 1837), was a Methodist minister, writer, and activist of mixed-race descent. Apess spent most of his career in New England.

In 1829 he published A Son of the Forest, one of the first autobiographies by a Native American writer. Apess was part Pequot by descent, especially through his mother's family, and identified with their culture. Later in life, he was adopted by the Mashpee tribe.

In recent decades, Apess's works have been frequently anthologized in collections of American literature, alongside other early American Native writers like Samson Occom and Jane Johnston Schoolcraft. Apess has been described as "perhaps the most successful activist on behalf of Native American rights in the antebellum United States."

== Early life ==
William Apess was born in 1798 in Colrain in northwestern Massachusetts to William and Candace Apess of the Pequot tribe. According to his autobiography, his father was mixed Pequot and European American, as Apess' white paternal grandfather had married a Pequot woman. He claimed descent from King Philip through his mother, who also had some European-American and African-American ancestry. Until the age of five, Apess lived with his family, including two brothers and two sisters, near Colrain.

His parents separated, and the five children were cared for by their maternal grandparents. But they were abusive and suffered from alcoholism. After seeing continued abuse, a neighbor intervened with the town selectmen on behalf of the children. They were taken away for their own safety and indentured to European-American families. Then five-year-old Apess was cared for by his neighbor, Mr. Furman, for a year until he had recovered from injuries sustained while living with his grandparents. His autobiography does not mention any contact with his Pequot relatives for the rest of his childhood. He said that he did not see his mother for twenty years after the beating. In contrast, he grew to love his adopted family dearly, despite his status as an indentured servant. When Mrs. Furman's mother died, he writes that "She had always been so kind to me that I missed her quite as much as her children, and I had been allowed to call her mother." Apess was sent to school during the winter for six years to gain an education, while also assisting Furman at work. Mrs. Furman, a Baptist, gave William his first memorable experience with Christianity when he was six, and she discussed with him the importance of going to heaven or hell. Even as a young child, his devotion was ardent. He describes the joy he gained from sermons, and the depression he suffered when Mr. Furman eventually forbade him from attending.

When William was eleven, Mr. Furman discovered his ill-formed plans to run away. He never really wanted to leave, but, despite his reassurances, the family he had come to regard as his own sold his indenture to Judge James Hillhouse, a member of the Connecticut elite. The elderly judge, too old to deal with an unruly and rejected child, quickly sold his indenture to Gen. William Williams, under whom Apess spent four years. During this period, Apess grew increasingly close to the "noisy Methodists," as Apess referred to them. The congregation he knew had many people of mixed race, including African Americans and Native Americans. The Methodists were more welcoming than the Congregational Church, to which the town elite belonged.

Apess ran away from General Williams at the age of fifteen and joined a militia in New York, where he fought in the War of 1812. By the age of 16, he became an alcoholic and struggled with alcoholism for the rest of his life. From the years 1816 to 1818, he worked at various jobs in Canada.

Troubled by his alcoholism, Apess decided to return home to the Pequot and his family in Massachusetts. Within a short period of time, he reclaimed his Pequot identity. He attended meetings of local Methodist groups and was baptized in December 1818.

== Personal life ==
In 1821, Apess married Mary Wood, also of mixed race. The couple had one son and three daughters together. After Mary died, Apess later remarried. He and his second wife settled in New York City in the late 1830s.

== Career ==
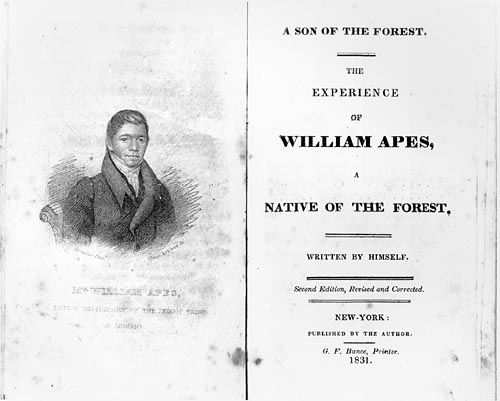
Autobiography of William Apess

After his marriage, Apess felt his vocation was to preach. In 1829 he was ordained as a Protestant Methodist minister, a group he found less hierarchical and rule bound than the Methodist Episcopal Church. In the same year he published his autobiography, A Son of the Forest: The Experience of William Apess, A Native of the Forest, Comprising a Notice of the Pequot Tribe of Indians, Written by Himself. Apess' work was one of the first autobiographies published by a Native American and was published partly in reaction to advocates of Indian Removal, including President Andrew Jackson. They wanted to remove Native Americans to west of the Mississippi River, especially those who were numerous in the Southeast. Apess based his narrative on his spiritual conversion, a common genre of the time, and commented also on European-American prejudices against Native Americans.

As was the Methodist practice of the day, Apess became an itinerant preacher; he preached in meetings throughout New England to mixed congregations including Native American, European-American, and African-American audiences. In 1833, during a visit to the town of Mashpee, the largest Native American town in Massachusetts, Apess established the first formal Native American temperance society among the Maspee Indians on 11 October 1833. Apess was elected president and forty-two Mashpee Indians signed up immediately. While in Mashpee, Apess became convinced the State was acting illegally in denying self-government to the Mashpee Wampanoag.

The Mashpee Wampanoag had a close culture and wooded land at the elbow of Cape Cod. Their limited autonomy had been reduced when the reservation was placed under supervision by a board of white overseers. These men allowed white settlers to take the Mashpee wood and permitted other incursions on their land. The Mashpee wanted to protect their grounds. Apess spoke out on their behalf at local meetings. He also participated in the so-called Mashpee Revolt of 1833-34, in which the Mashpee took action to restore their self-government. They wrote to the state government announcing their intention to rule themselves, according to their constitutional rights, and to prevent whites from taking away their wood (a recurring problem). In May 1833, the Mashpee tribe wrote to Harvard College, which administered the Williams Fund that paid for a minister to them.

The tribe had never been consulted in such appointment and objected to Rev. Mr. Fish, who had long been appointed to them. They did not like his preaching, and said that he had enriched himself by appropriating hundreds of acres of woodland at the tribe's expense. Lastly, they prevented a settler, William Sampson, from taking wood away from their property and unloaded his wagon. Three Indians were indicted for riot and Apess was jailed for a month as a result. An attorney assisted them in successfully appealing to the legislature, but initially Governor Levi Lincoln Jr. threatened the group with military force.

The issues were reported sympathetically by Harnett of the Boston Advocate through June and July. The Mashpee protest followed the Nullification Crisis of 1832 on the national level, in which Southern states proposed they could nullify federal law. The historian Barry O'Connell suggests that Apess intended to highlight the Mashpee attempt to nullify Massachusetts laws discriminating against Native peoples. Apess continually drew parallels between the desire of free people of color for their rights, particularly Native Americans, and the historic struggle of European-American colonists for independence. He drew from the history of relations between Native Americans and the colonists, as well as relations within the United States.

During the period 1831-1836, Apess published several of his sermons and public lectures, and became known as a powerful speaker. But, struggling with alcoholism and increasing resentment of white treatment of Natives, he gradually lost the respect in which he had been held; both white and Mashpee groups distanced themselves from him. In 1836, he gave a public lecture in the form of a memorial eulogy for King Philip, a seventeenth-century Indian leader who was assassinated by the Plymouth colonists. Apess extolled him as a leader equal to any among the European Americans. Apess first delivered the eulogy in Boston and then in several other venues in New England.

After publishing his lecture, Apess disappeared from New England public life. He moved to New York City with his second wife and children, trying to find work. The recession of 1837 was broadly damaging and especially affected the lower and working classes, so he struggled in New York.

== Death ==
At the age of 41, William Apess died of a cerebral hemorrhage (stroke) on April 10, 1839 at 31 Washington Street in New York City.

== Quotes ==
- "I felt convinced that Christ died for all mankind – that age, sect, color, country, or situation make no difference. I felt an assurance that I was included in the plan of redemption with all my brethren." – A Son of the Forest
- "As the immortal Washington lives endeared and engraven on the hearts of every white in America, never to be forgotten in time – even such is the immortal Philip honored, as held in memory by the degraded but yet graceful descendants who appreciate his character." – Eulogy on King Philip (Metacom)
- "Is it not because there reigns in the breast of many who are leaders a most unrighteous, unbecoming, and impure black principle, and as corrupt and unholy as it can be – while these very same unfeeling, self-esteemed characters pretend to take the skin as a pretext to keep us from our unalienable and lawful rights?" – An Indian's Looking-Glass For The White Man

== Works ==
- Apes, William (1829), A Son of the Forest: The Experience of William Apes, A Native of the Forest, Comprising a Notice of the Pequod Tribe of Indians, Written by Himself.
- Apes, William (1831), The Increase of the Kingdom of Christ, a Sermon.
- Apess, William (1833), The Experiences of Five Christian Indians of the Pequod Tribe; or An Indian's Looking-Glass for the White Man.
- Apes, William (1835), The Indian Nullification of the Unconstitutional Laws of Massachusetts, Relative to the Marshpee Tribe: or, The Pretended Riot Explained, Boston Press of J. Howe.
- Apes, William (1836), Eulogy on King Philip, as Pronounced at the Odeon, in Federal Street, Boston, by the Rev. William Apes, an Indian.

== See also ==
- List of writers from peoples indigenous to the Americas
- Native American temperance activists
- Eulogy on King Philip by William Apess, 1836

== Bibliography ==
- Brooks, Lisa (2008), The Common Pot: The Recovery of Native Space in the Northeast, U of Minnesota Press.
- Carlson, David J. (2006), Sovereign Selves: American Indian Autobiography and the Law, U of Illinois Press.
- Doolen, Andy (2005), Fugitive Empire: Locating Early American Imperialism, U of Minnesota Press.
- Elrod, Eileen R. (2008), Piety and Dissent: Race, Gender, and Biblical Rhetoric in Early American Autobiography, U of Massachusetts Press.
- Gura, Philip F. (2015), The Life of William Apess, Pequot, University of North Carolina Press
- Lopenzina, Drew (2017), Through an Indian's Looking Glass: A Cultural Biography of William Apess, Pequot, University of Massachusetts Press.
- O'Connell, Barry, ed. (1992), On Our Own Ground: The Complete Writings of William Apess, a Pequot, University of Massachusetts Press, ISBN 0870237705.
- O'Connell, Barry, ed. (1997), A Son of the Forest and Other Writings, University of Massachusetts, ISBN 978-1-55849-107-6.
- Peyer, Bernd C. (1997), The Tutor'd Mind: Indian Missionary-Writers in Antebellum America, University of Massachusetts Press.
- Tiro, Karim M. (1996), "Denominated "Savage": Methodism, Writing and Identity in the Works of William Apess, A Pequot", American Quarterly, 48 (4): 653–679, doi:10.1353/aq.1996.0047.
