= William L. White =

American historian

William L. White is a writer on addiction recovery and policy.

== Biography ==
White was born the eldest son in an Army family, father, William "Billy" White and mother, Alice White. His father was a construction worker and his mother was a nurse. His family grew quite large with more than 20 adopted, foster, related and siblings living in a small rural home in Decatur, Illinois. He received a bachelor's degree from Eureka College, studying psychology, sociology and history.

== Career ==
His first job was with the Illinois Department of Mental Health in 1967, where his responsibilities were to tour the wards of the mental health institution and screen the alcoholics and addicts for community placement. In the seventies, he became an outreach worker, gathering addicts and alcoholics from jail or hospitals and connecting them with services like Salvation Army shelters, SRO’s and AA meetings. In 1970, he worked at Chestnut Health Systems, one of the first local community treatment centers in Illinois, and became the clinical director of the facility.

In 1975, White left to pursue a master's degree in Addiction Studies at Goddard College. Upon graduating he began working with the Illinois Dangerous Drug Commission, and then became deputy director of the National Institute on Drug Abuse’s training center in Washington DC. In 1986, he returned to the Chestnut Health System and founded the Lighthouse Institute, an addiction treatment research center. In 1998, he published his best-known book, Slaying the Dragon: The History of Addiction Treatment and Recovery in America. He was a senior consultant at the Chestnut Health System engaged in research and writing on addiction treatment and recovery coaching up until his retirement in 2014. He continues to write about the history of treatment and recovery on his website.

== Professional appointments ==
Bill White's has held many professional appointments since 2000 to the present day including:

- Advisory Committee, NAADAC Minority Fellowship Program
- Advisory Council, Faces and Voices of Recovery
- Advisory Board, Harm Reduction, Abstinence and Moderation (HAMS)
- Board of Directors, Betty Ford Institute
- National Advisory Board, Recovery Research Institute, Harvard Medical School
- NAADAC Recovery to Practice Advisory Committee
- UK National Treatment Agency Expert Group on Recovery-oriented Drug Treatment
- Advisory Panel, State of New Jersey Governor’s Council on Alcoholism & Drug Abuse
- Scientific Advisory Panel, Phoenix House, Inc.
- International Advisory Council, SMART Recovery
- Advisory Board, LifeRing Secular Recovery
- Advisory Board, Jewish Network of Addiction Recovery Support
- Advisory Council, Association of Recovery Schools
- Board of Directors, Wellbriety for Prisons, Inc.
- Editorial Board, Counselor Magazine
- Editorial Board, Student Assistance Journal
- Editorial Board, Quest House Review
- Board Member, Wired In to Recovery, UK
- Editorial Board, Alcoholism Treatment Quarterly
- Editorial Board, Advances in Addiction and Recovery

== Awards ==
1999	McGovern Family Foundation Award for the best book on addiction recovery for Slaying the Dragon
2001	Keith Keesy Memorial Award presented by the Illinois Association of Alcohol and Drug Dependence
2001	President’s Award, NAADAC—The Association for Addiction Professionals
2002	Lifetime Achievement Award, Illinois Alcohol and Other Drug Abuse Professional Certification Association (IAODAPCA)
2003	National Association of Addiction Treatment Provider’s (NAATP) Michael Q. Ford Journalism Award
2004	National Council on Alcoholism and Drug Dependence (NCADD) Award for Compelling Documentation of the Alcoholism Movement in the United States
2006	Eagleville Award—an annual award presented by Eagleville Hospital to a person who has made a significant contribution to the field of addiction treatment.
2006	Lifetime Achievement Award presented by NAADAC—The Association for Addiction Professionals
2006	Jeff Luke Servant Leadership Award presented by White Bison for service to the Native American Wellbriety Movement
2007	John P. McGovern, M.D. Award presented by the American Society of Addiction Medicine (ASAM) for outstanding contributions to the field of Addiction Medicine
2009	Lifetime Achievement Award, Mayor’s Drug and Alcohol Executive Commission, City of Philadelphia
2010	Dr. Nelson J. Bradley Life Time Achievement Award, National Association of Addiction Treatment Providers
2010	The John P. McGovern Award and Lecture, Institute for Behavior and Health, Inc.
2010	Recovery Award for Excellence in Addiction Research & Education, Foundation for Recovery
2011	Recovery Heroes Honoree, NET Institute-Center for Addiction & Recovery Education
2012	Norman E. Zinberg Award & Memorial Lecture, Harvard University School of Medicine, Department of Psychiatry
2012	Friend of the Field Award (for extraordinary contributions to the field of opioid addiction treatment), American Association for the Treatment of Opioid Dependence
2012	Lifetime Achievement, The Voice Awards, Substance Abuse & Mental Health Services Administration
2013	Saul Feldman Award for Lifetime Achievement for sustained and significant contributions to leadership and policy in the mental health and addiction recovery field. ACMHA The College for Behavioral Health Leadership
2013	Resolution of commendation for sustained and seminal contributions to the addiction treatment and recovery field, Board of Directors, The Illinois Alcoholism and Drug Dependence Association
2013	Distinguished Advocate of the Year Award, Texas Association of Addiction Professionals
2015	Distinguished Lifetime Achievement Award, America Honors Recovery / Faces and Voices of Recovery for outstanding contributions and lifetime devotion to the recovery advocacy movement.
2015	William L. White Lifetime Achievement Award for the Advancement of Recovery Research (year one recipient of named award). Young People in Recovery & Association of Recovery Schools.

== Books ==
- White, William L. (1986). Incest in the Organizational Family: The Ecology of Burnout in Closed Systems. Bloomington, Ill: Lighthouse Training Institute. ISBN 9780938475002.
- White, William L. (1996). Pathways From the Culture of Addiction to the Culture of Recovery: A Travel Guide for Addiction Professions (2nd ed.). Center City, Minn: Hazelden. ISBN 9780585126258.
- White, William L. (1997). The Incestuous Workplace Stress and Distress in the Organizational Family. Center City, Minn: Hazelden. ISBN 9780585305929.
- White, William L. (1998). Slaying the Dragon, The History of Addiction Treatment and Recovery in America. Bloomington, Ill: The Chestnut Health Systems/Lighthouse Institute. ISBN 9780938475071.
- Kelly, John F.; White, William L., eds. (2011). Addiction Recovery Management Theory, Research and Practice. Totowa, N.J.: Humana. ISBN 9781603279604.
- Don Coyhis and William L. White, Alcohol Problems in Native America: The Untold Story of Resistance and Recovery. Colorado Springs, CO: Coyhis Publishing & Consulting, Inc., 2006 ISBN 1599752298
