= Native American temperance activists =

Native Americans dedicated to preventing alcohol abuse

A number of prominent Native Americans have protested against the social and cultural damage inflicted by alcohol on indigenous communities, and have campaigned to raise awareness of the dangers of alcohol and to restrict its availability to Native populations. Initially, these activists resisted the use of rum and brandy as trade items during the colonial era, in an effort to protect Native Americans from cultural changes they viewed as destructive. Later activists framed temperance in terms of Christianity, conforming to the broader temperance movement in the United States. Others led revitalization movements to restore Native American dignity by reverting to traditional customs and ceremonies or attempted to establish alcohol-free communities. During the 1800s several religious movements combined tradition with Christianity to attract a wider following. Modern-day addiction specialists integrate the psychology of substance abuse treatment with traditional rituals and symbolism and with community rehabilitation to reduce stressors and help recovering alcoholics maintain a healthy lifestyle.

== Peter Chartier ==
Among the first Native American leaders to launch an organized protest to the distribution of alcohol in indigenous communities was Peter Chartier (1690-1759), a French-Canadian-Shawnee who became chief of the Pekowi Turtle Clan. In 1737 he attempted to stop the sale of rum in Shawnee villages by encouraging the Shawnees to destroy any supplies of rum brought in by traders. On 20 March 1738, he and 98 other Shawnee elders, including Neucheconeh, sent a letter addressed to Thomas Penn and Acting Governor James Logan, stating:

We would be glad if our brothers would send strict orders that we might prevent the rum coming to the hunting cabins or to the neighboring towns. We have sent wampum to the French, to the Five Nations, to the Delaware... to tell them not to bring any rum to our towns, for we want none ... so we would be glad if our brothers would inform the traders not bring any..."

Penn declared Chartier an outlaw and he was eventually forced to leave his home in the Province of Pennsylvania and relocate to southern Illinois. Laws governing the sale of alcohol in Pennsylvania were strengthened, however: the existing fine was doubled to twenty pounds, and a surety bond of one hundred pounds was required from anyone applying for a license to trade furs with Native Americans. Lieutenant-Governor George Thomas later gave authority to indigenous peoples to destroy supplies of alcohol brought illegally into their communities.

Although this was the most severe proclamation yet implemented to control the distribution of alcohol to Native Americans, it was also not strictly enforced and alcohol abuse continued to be an increasing problem in indigenous communities.

== King Hagler ==
On 26 May 1756, the Catawba leader King Hagler (c. 1700–1763) met with North Carolina Chief Justice Peter Henley in Salisbury, North Carolina to discuss the provisions of a recent treaty. Hagler took the opportunity to make a speech in which he decried the sale of alcohol in indigenous communities:

I desire a stop may be put to the selling of strong Liquors by the White people to my people especially near the Indian Nation. If the White people make strong drink, let them sell it to one another or drink it in their own Families. This will avoid a great deal of mischief which otherwise will happen from my people getting drunk and quarreling with the White people.

In response to Hagler's complaints, regulations adopted at the Augusta Conference of 1767 attempted to limit the amount of alcohol brought into Native American communities: "Any Trader who by himself, substitute, or servant, shall carry more than fifteen Gallons of Rum, at any one time, into any nation of Indians...shall forfeit his bond and license."

== Neolin ==
Inspired by a religious vision in 1761, the Lenape prophet Neolin proclaimed that Native Americans needed to reject the goods and lifestyles of the European settlers and return to a more traditional way of life, specifically rejecting alcohol, materialism, and polygamy: "Above all, you must abstain from drinking their deadly beson [medicine], which they have forced upon us, for the sake of increasing their gains and diminishing our numbers." Neolin served as the direct inspiration for later Native American religious leaders including the Ojibwa chief Maya-Ga-Wy, who is remembered for saying in 1836, "You must not taste the whiskey nor the rum of the Americans; it is the drink of the Evil Spirit."

== Samson Occom ==
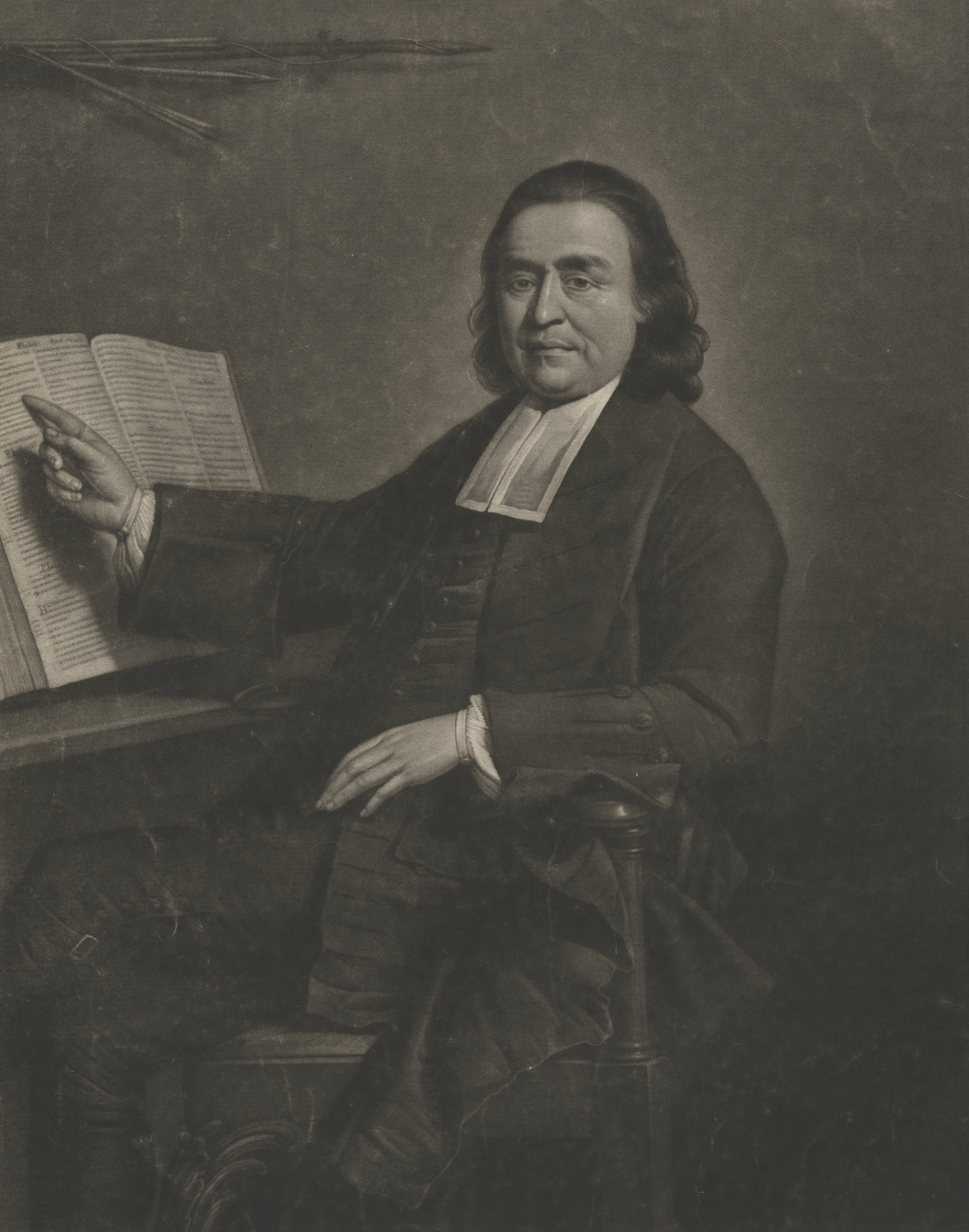
The Reverend Samson Occom

On 2 September 1772, the Mohegan missionary Samson Occom (1723 – 1792) was asked to preach a sermon at the hanging of Moses Paul, a Native American who had been convicted of murder during a drunken rampage. Occom's sermon, later published as "A Sermon, Preached at the Execution of Moses Paul, an Indian; Who Was Executed at New Haven, on the Second of September, 1772; For the Murder of Mr. Moses Cook, Late of Waterbury, on the 7th of December, 1771," ended with a lengthy speech to Native Americans about the sins of drunkenness:

When we are intoxicated with strong drink we drown our rational powers, by which we are distinguished from the brutal creation--we unman ourselves, and bring ourselves not only level with the beasts of the field, but seven degrees beneath them...How many [drunkards] have been drowned in our rivers, and how many frozen to death in the winter season! And now let me exhort you all to break off from your drunkenness...Take warning by this doleful sight before us, and by all the dreadful judgments that have befallen poor drunkards.

The sermon was remarkable in that Occom's audience included both colonists and Native Americans, and Occom knew that the topic of Native American drunkenness was controversial.

== Little Turtle ==
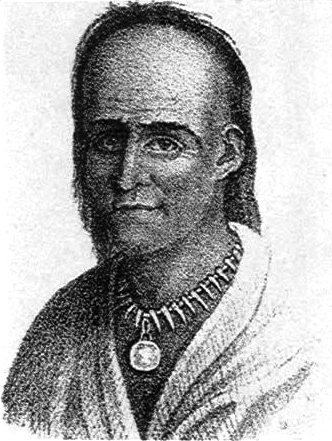
Little Turtle (Mihšihkinaahkwa) about 1798

A lifelong teetotaler, the Miami chief Little Turtle (1747-1812) campaigned against the sale and consumption of alcohol in Native American communities. On 14 January 1802 he delivered a speech to President Thomas Jefferson and members of the US Senate:

Father, nothing can be done to advantage unless the Great Council of the Sixteen Fires, now assembled, will prohibit any person from selling spirituous liquors among their red brothers. The introduction of this poison has been prohibited in our camps but not in our towns, where many of our hunters, for this poison, dispose of, not only their furs, etc., but also their blankets and guns, and return to their families destitute...Owing to the introduction of this fatal poison, we have become less numerous and happy.

On 27 January 1802 Jefferson said in an address to Congress:

These people are becoming very sensible of the baneful effects produced on their morals, their health, and existence by the abuse of ardent spirits, and some of them earnestly desire a prohibition of that article from being carried among them.

On 30 March 1802, Congress passed the revised Indian Nonintercourse Act. This and other federal laws restricting the sale of alcohol to Native Americans remained in effect until 1953.

Little Turtle met also with George Washington and John Adams in his campaign against the sale of alcohol to Native Americans. He inspired William Henry Harrison to enact a series of regulations preventing the use of alcohol to cheat Indians in the fur trade.

== Handsome Lake ==
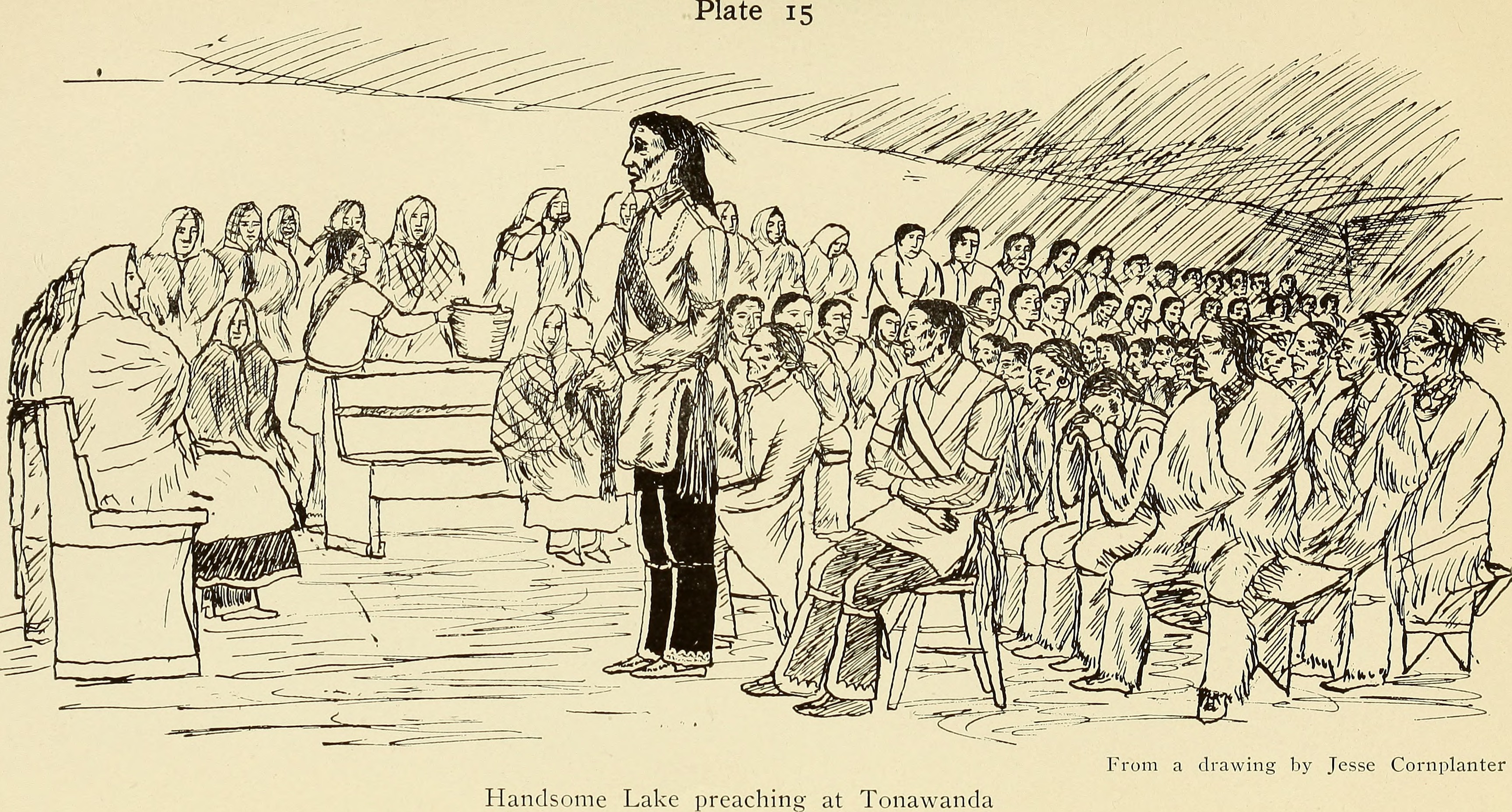
Handsome Lake (Sganyodaiyo) Preaching at Tonawanda Reservation. From a drawing by Jesse Cornplanter.

In 1799, after a period of illness due to many years of alcoholism, the Seneca leader Handsome Lake (1735 – 1815) had visions that made him feel obligated to learn the English language and preserve the lands traditionally occupied by Native Americans. Shortly after Handsome Lake's first vision, he ceased drinking alcohol and began preaching against drunkenness. His message outlined a moral code that was eventually referred to as the Code of Handsome Lake, known today as the Longhouse Religion. Handsome Lake influenced large numbers of Seneca and Iroquois to abstain from alcohol, which had significant positive social and economic consequences. He died on 10 August 1815. His obituary in the Buffalo Gazette described him as a man once "remarkable only for stupidity and beastly drunkenness" who had "immediately abandoned his habits, visited the tribes—related his story—which was believed, and the consequence has been, that from a filthy, lazy drunken set of beings, they have become cleanly, industrious, sober, and happy."

== Yonaguska ==
Also known as Drowning Bear, Yonaguska (1759–1839) was a leader of the Eastern Band of Cherokee Indians of North Carolina. In 1819, after several years of alcoholism, Yonaguska experienced a vision and decided to ban alcohol from the community. He was influenced by the fate of the neighboring Catawba Indians, who had suffered "the injurious effects of intemperance" following the introduction of alcohol by white traders. The Eastern Cherokee had withdrawn from the Cherokee Nation on March 10, 1819, and each family had received 640 acres of farmland, but land speculators, driven by the discovery of gold in Georgia, employed alcohol in illegal negotiations and convinced many Oconaluftee Cherokee to sell their lands. Yonaguska, with the help of his adopted son (William Holland Thomas, an attorney), drew up a temperance declaration in 1830 stating "The undersigned Cherokees, belonging to the town of Qualla, agree to abandon the use of spirituous liquors," and urged members of his community to sign it. Partly as a result of his temperance pledge, Yonaguska and his community of about 1000 Cherokee were allowed to remain in North Carolina during the Cherokee removal of 1836–1839.

== Tenskwatawa ==
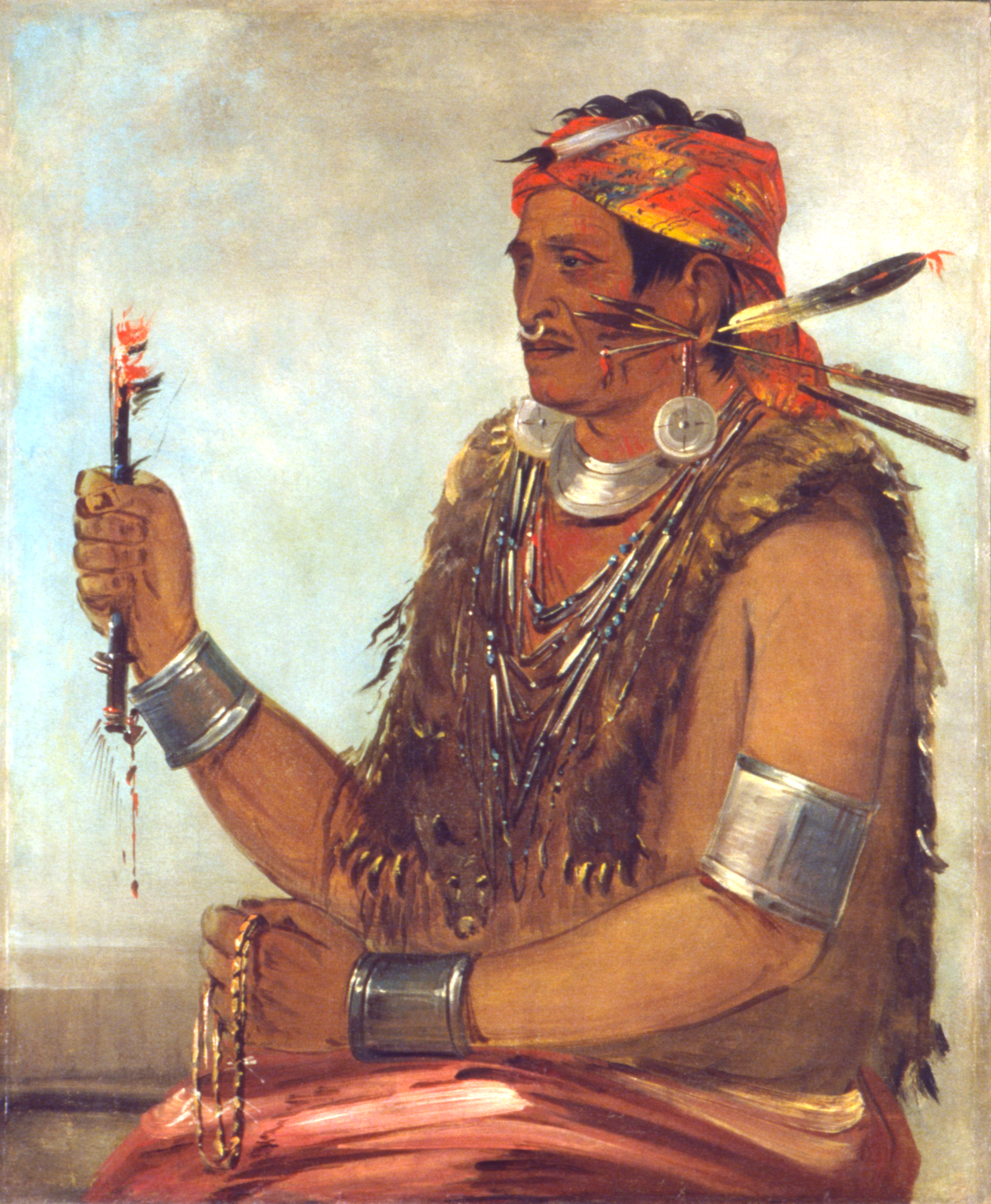
Tenskwatawa (Ten-sqúat-a-way), Painted in 1830 by George Catlin

In May 1805 the Shawnee leader Tenskwatawa (1775 – 1836) experienced a vision when he fell into unconsciousness during an alcoholic stupor and was thought to be dead. Unexpectedly reviving as his body was being prepared for burial, he recounted a powerful vision of two different worlds, one filled with ample blessings for the virtuous ones who lived as the Master of Life intended, while the other world was filled with pain, hardship, and terror for those who refused to follow traditional tribal ways. Tenskwatawa became known as "The Prophet," began preaching, and emerged as a powerful and influential spiritual leader. The Purification Movement urged followers to reject European habits such as consumption of alcohol, and to return to their traditional ways. Facing starvation and incessant conflicts with white settlers, in 1808 Tenskwatawa and his older brother Tecumseh founded an alcohol-free community near present-day Lafayette, Indiana called Prophetstown. It soon expanded into a large, multi-tribal community that became a "powerful Indian city-state" for Tenskwatawa's spiritual movement.

== William Apess ==
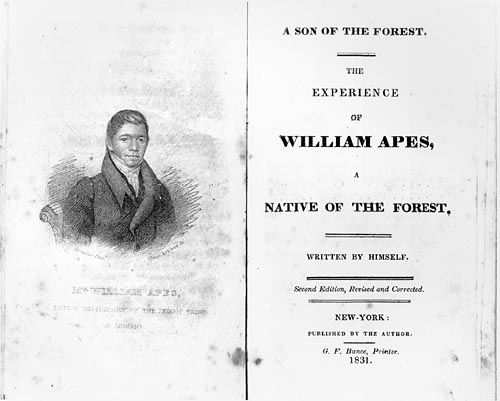
Autobiography of William Apess

The Pequot writer and minister William Apess (1798–1839) established the first formal Native American temperance society among the Maspee Indians on 11 October 1833. Apess was elected president and forty-two Mashpee Indians signed up immediately. Minutes of the first meeting on 14 November state:

Resolved, That we will not countenance the use of ardent spirits among us, in any way whatever; and that we will do all in our power to suppress it. That we will not buy it ourselves, nor suffer it to be in our houses, unless ordered by a physician.

Apess was raised by his alcoholic grandparents and as a child he was abused; he urged Native Americans to avoid alcohol:

My sufferings certainly were through the white man's measure; for they most certainly brought spirituous liquors first among my people. For the burning curse and demon of despair came among us: Surely it came through the hands of the whites. Sure the red man had never sought to destroy one another as this bane of hell would! And we little babes of the forest had to suffer much on its account. Oh white man! How can you account to God for this? Are you not afraid that the children of the forest will rise up in judgment and condemn you?…Little children, if you have parents that drink the fiery waters, do all you can, both by your tears and prayers and friendly admonitions, to persuade them to stop; for it will most certainly ruin them, if they persist in it.

Apess was eventually forced to leave Cape Cod, possibly due to his own inability to quit drinking. He suffered from alcoholism throughout his life until his death at age 41 in New York City.

== Kennekuk ==
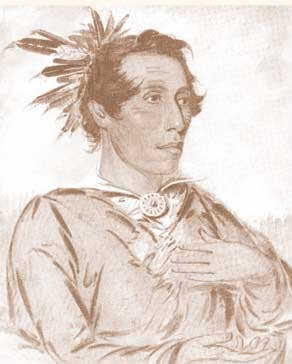
Kennekuk in about 1832.

The Kickapoo shaman Kennekuk (1790-1852) renounced alcohol when, as a young man, he killed his uncle in a fit of drunken rage, and was ostracized by his tribe. He wandered between frontier settlements in Indiana and Illinois begging for food until a Catholic priest took him in to teach him Christianity. Kennekuk began preaching to persuade others to quit drinking, returned to his community, and by 1816 he had become a leading chief of the Kickapoos. Although influenced by Christian teachings, Kennekuk's message contained an implicit ethnic nationalism which merged with, rather than contradicted, traditional Kickapoo beliefs. Between 1833 and 1852 he urged his followers to resist efforts by Indian agents and missionaries to force his people to accept Christianity and standardized schooling, and to oppose the forcible division of tribal lands into individual allotments. Within a short time, alcohol use among his followers had declined significantly and his community became more cohesive and productive.

== George Copway ==
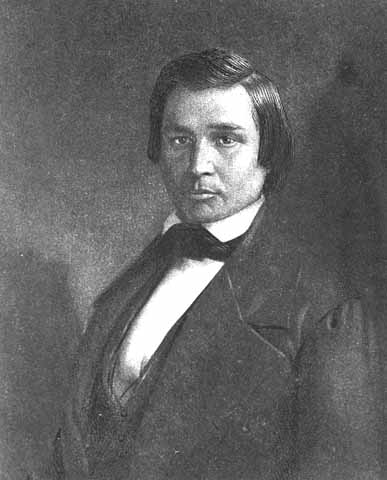
George Copway (Kahgegagahbowh) in 1850

The Ojibwa newspaper editor George Copway (1818 – 1869) used his 1851 publication The Traditional History and Characteristic Sketches of The Ojibway Nation to describe how alcohol was one of many tools used by whites to weaken Native American social fabric:

The introduction of spirituous liquors...has been greater than all other evils combined. Intemperance and disease. The fire-water has done its work of disaster. By it the glad shouts of the youth of our land have died away in wails of grief! Fathers have followed their children to their graves. Children have sent their wail of woe, echoing from vale to vale. And around the cheering fires of the Indian, the white man has received the gain of avarice. Peace and Happiness entwined around the fire-side of the Indian once. Union, harmony, and a common brotherhood cemented them all. But as soon as these vile drinks were introduced, dissipation commenced, and the ruin and downfall of a noble race has gone on — every year lessening their numbers.

Copway planned to establish a self-governed, alcohol-free First Nations territory known as "Kahgega" that would have eventually achieved statehood. In 1850 he petitioned unsuccessfully for Washington to support his ambitions, arguing his case to Congress in "Organization of a New Indian Territory, East of the Missouri River."

== 19th century religious movements ==
By the late nineteenth century, Native American religious leaders typically included abstinence from alcohol in their moral teachings. Around 1880, the Commanche chief Quanah Parker (c. 1845 or 1852 – 1911), one of the founders of the Native American Church, advocated a return to the traditional Native American practice of using mind-altering substances only in a ritual context. By the early twentieth century an ethical code known as the 'Peyote Road' had developed in the religion, emphasizing brotherly love, honesty, marital fidelity, hard work and economic self-reliance, trustworthiness, family responsibility, and strict avoidance of alcohol.

The Indian Shaker Church, founded by the Squaxin Island prophet John Slocum (1838 – 1897) after he had a vision in 1881, is a syncretic combination of Native American, Catholic and Protestant belief systems that requires its members to abstain from alcohol. During the solar eclipse of January 1, 1889, Wovoka (c. 1856 - 1932), a Paiute co-founder of the Ghost Dance Religion, had a prophetic vision describing the resurrection of the Paiute dead and the removal of whites and their works from North America. Wovoka taught that in order to bring this vision to pass, the Native Americans must live righteously and refrain from drinking alcohol.

== Don Coyhis ==
Don Coyhis (born 1943) is a Mohican from the Stockbridge-Munsee Community in Wisconsin. He has worked on designing and implementing culturally appropriate alcohol and drug recovery programs in Native American communities since 1994. While on a five-day fasting journey in the Rampart Range Mountains, Coyhis saw a vision of a white bison and decided to found the nonprofit charity White Bison Inc. to help Native Americans affected by alcoholism. Coyhis promotes Wellbriety, a holistic approach that emphasizes community support for individuals as well as a return to cultural roots for Native American communities. Coyhis trains peer support workers, known as "firestarters," to work in their home communities with recovering alcoholics and their families.

== See also ==
- Alcohol and Native Americans
- Temperance movement in the United States
- Lars Levi Laestadius, an indigenous Sami preacher and Christian temperance activist
