= Mashpee Woodland Revolt =

Uprising of the Mashpee people

The Mashpee Woodland Revolt or Mashpee Revolt was a non-violent, 1833–1834 uprising of the Mashpee people against white inhabitants in New England. A group of the Mashpee Wampanoags traveled to Boston to seek justice for settler encroachments. William Apess was one of their leaders.
