= Samuel King (artist) =

American painter (1749–1819)

- Born: January 24, 1749; Newport, Rhode Island
- Died: December 20, 1819 (aged 70); Newport, Rhode Island
- Occupation: Painter

Samuel King (January 24, 1749 − December 20, 1819) was an American painter of miniature portraits and instructor.

== Early life ==
Samuel King was born about January 24, 1749, in Newport, Rhode Island. His father, Benjamin King, made navigational and mathematical instruments. King received training to become a house painter in Boston, Massachusetts, which became one of his many occupations.

== Career ==
King had pursued several vocations before beginning his artistic career. He painted houses, made frames, decorated carriages and made mathematical and navigational instruments. After his marriage in 1770, King became increasingly interested in art, but also continued to make instruments.

He made a miniature portrait of Reverend Ezra Stiles in 1770, which is now part of the Metropolitan Museum of Art's collection. Stiles, who performed King's marriage ceremony, went on to become the president of Yale College. The following year he painted Stiles' portrait on canvas.

King taught artists Ann Hall, Charles Bird King, Edward Greene Malbone, and Washington Allston. Malbone had been encouraged by King to become an artist. Hall visited Newport to receive lessons from King.

He created a transparency for the Rhode Island State House in 1783, which was "probably" illuminated by torches placed behind it.

== Personal life ==
King was married to Amy Vernon in 1770 by Reverend Ezra Stiles. She was the daughter of a successful merchant, Samuel Vernon.

He died December 20, 1819, in Newport.

== Gallery ==
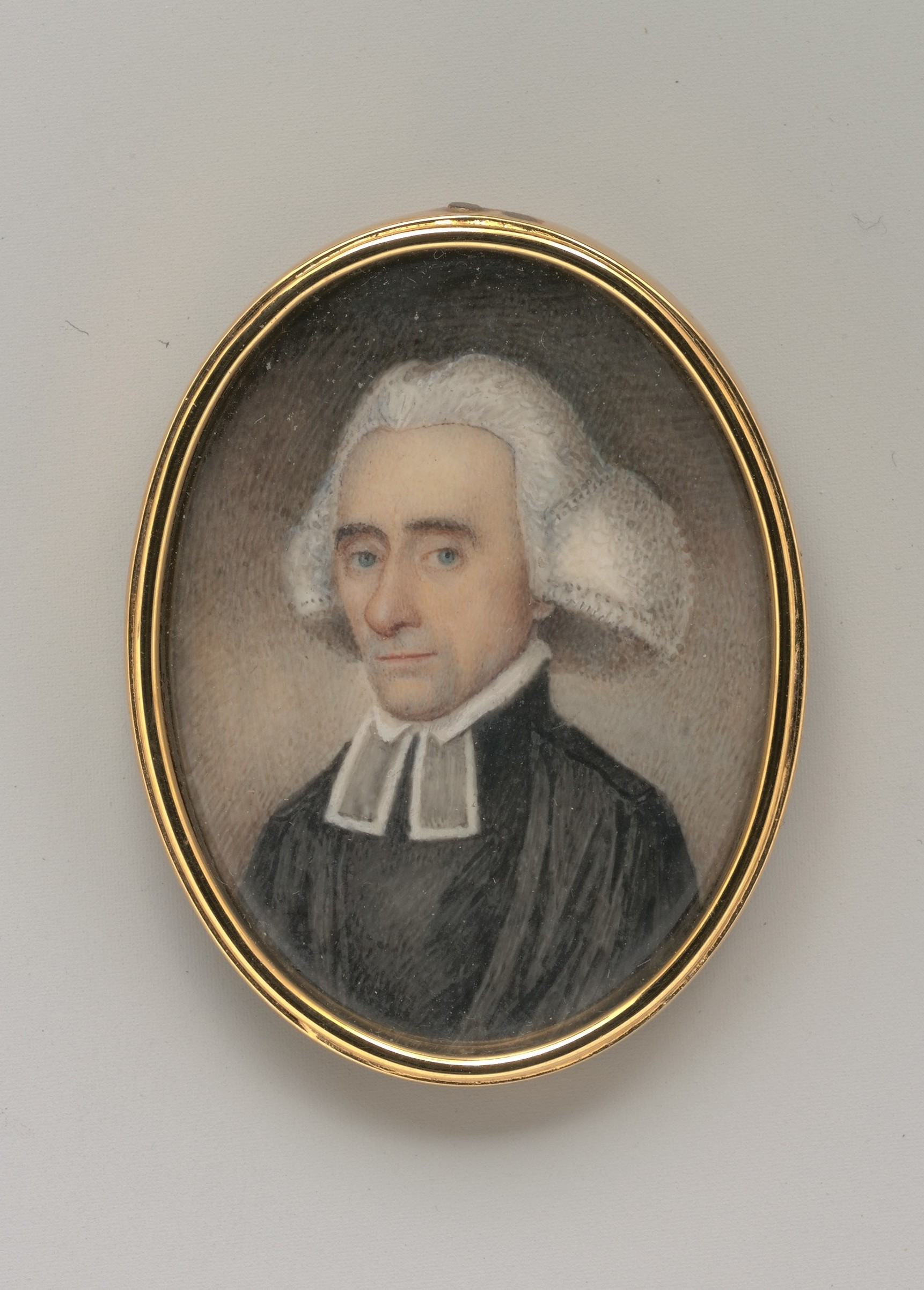
Reverend Ezra Stiles (1770)

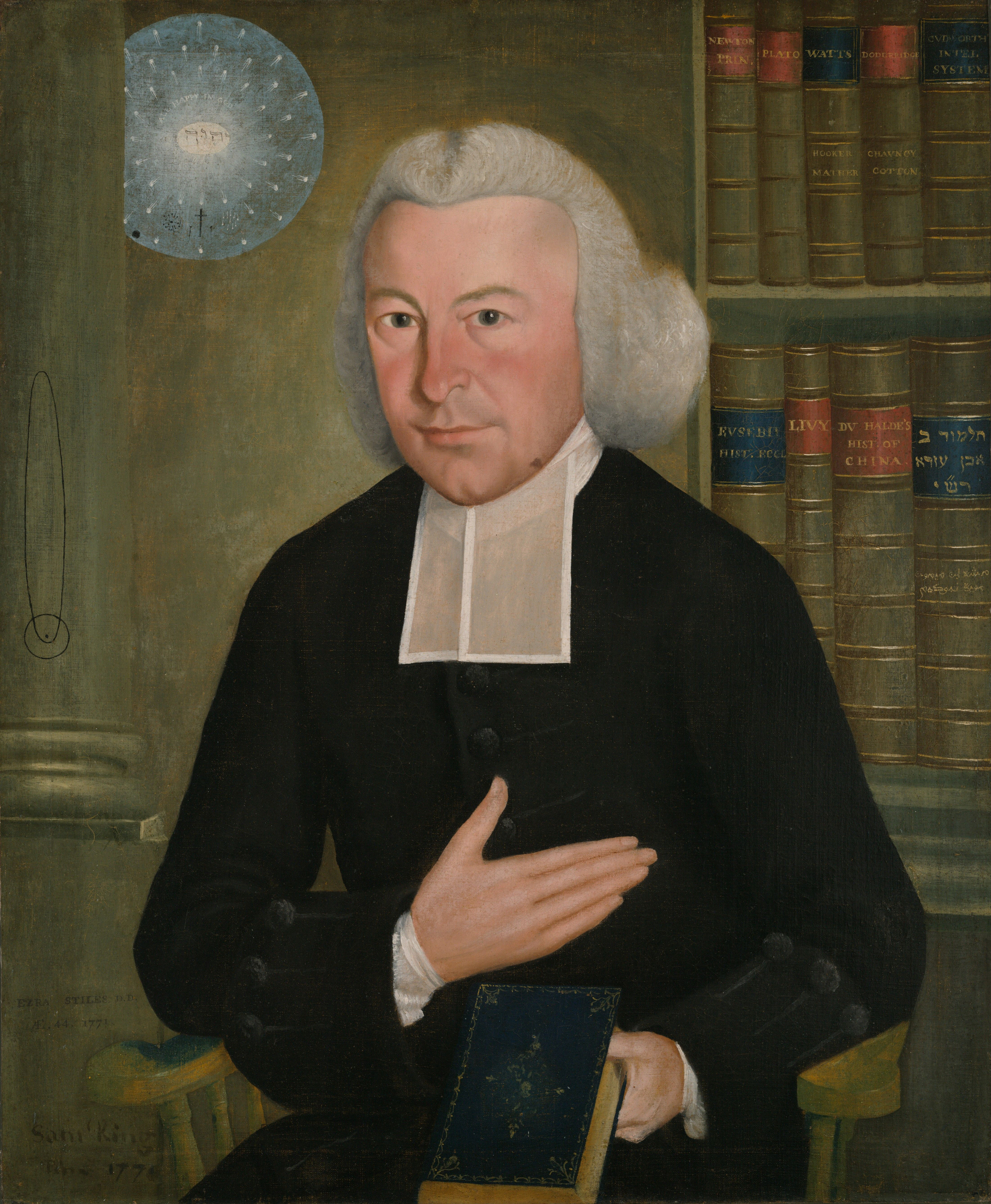
Reverend Ezra Stiles (1770–1771)
