= Samson Occom =

Mohegan Presbyterian cleric

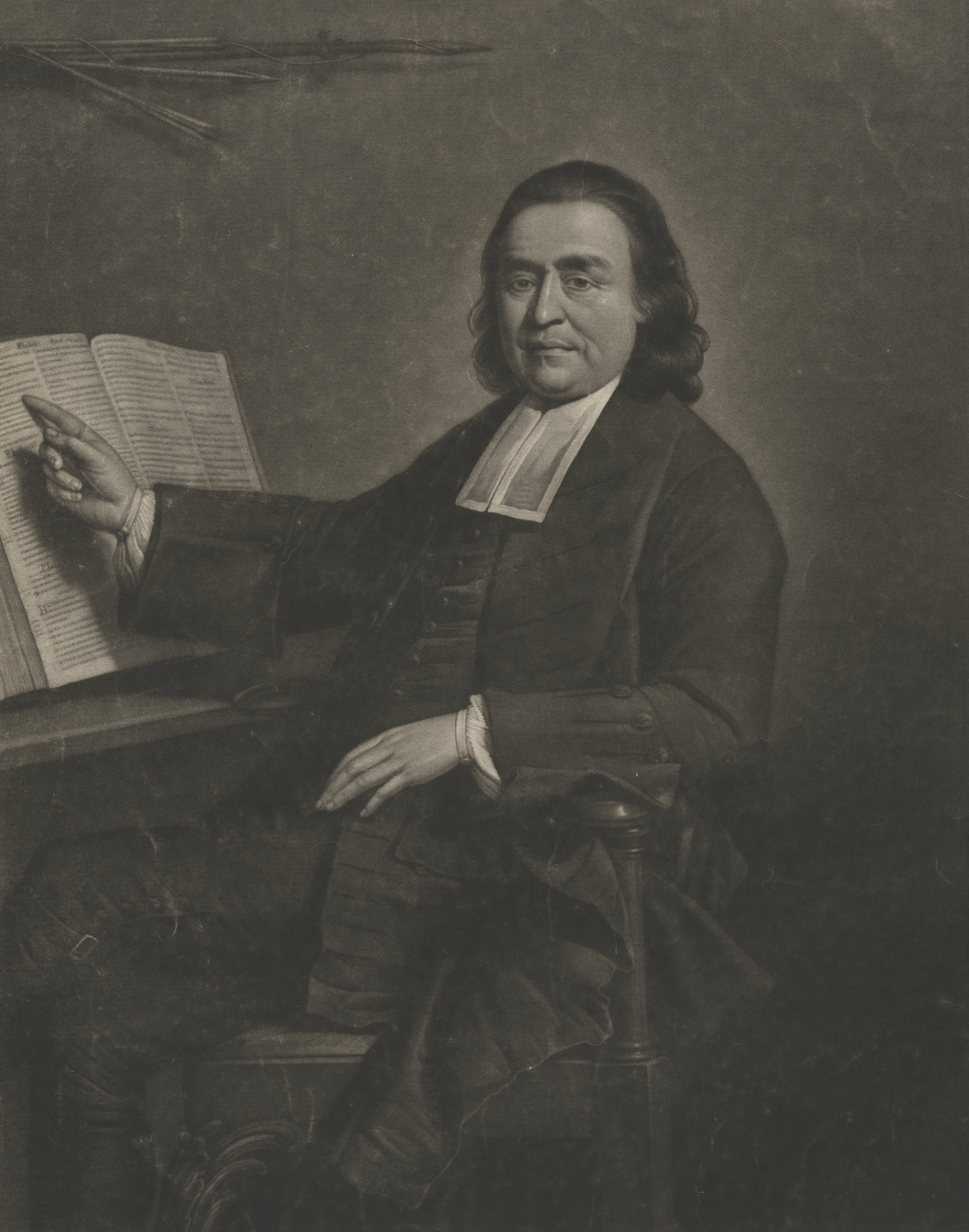
- Engraving by Jonathan Spilsbury, c. 1768, after a Mason Chamberlin portrait
- Born: 1723; New London, Connecticut
- Died: July 14, 1792 (aged 69); New Stockbridge
- Occupations: Minister, writer
- Spouse: Mary Fowler
- Children: 11
- Relatives: Uncas (ancestor)

Samson Occom (1723 – July 14, 1792) was a Mohegan clergyman and writer born near New London, Connecticut who converted to Presbyterianism and became a cleric. (Note: Although the manuscripts show many spellings such Ockam, Alcom, Aukum, Aucum, Occum, and Aucom, he himself wrote it Samson Occom.) Occom was the second Native American to publish his writings in English (after son-in-law Joseph Johnson (Mohegan/Brothertown) whose letter to Moses Paul, published April 1772, preceded Occom's by 6 months), the first Native American to write down his autobiography, and also helped found several settlements, including what ultimately became known as the Brothertown Indians. Together with the missionary John Eliot, Occom became one of the foremost missionaries who incorporated Christianized European culture with Native American communities.

== Early life and education ==
Born to Joshua Tomacham and his wife Sarah, Occom is believed to be a descendant of Uncas, the notable Mohegan chief. According to his autobiography, at the age of 16 or 17, Occom heard the teachings of Christian evangelical preachers in the Great Awakening. He began to study theology at the "Lattin School" of Congregational minister Eleazar Wheelock in 1743 and stayed for four years until leaving to begin his own career. In addition to improving his English, Occom learned to read and speak Latin, Greek, and Hebrew. As a young man, the only book he owned was the Bible. From 1747 until 1749, Occom worked under and studied with the Reverend Solomon Williams in New London, Connecticut.

== Ministry ==
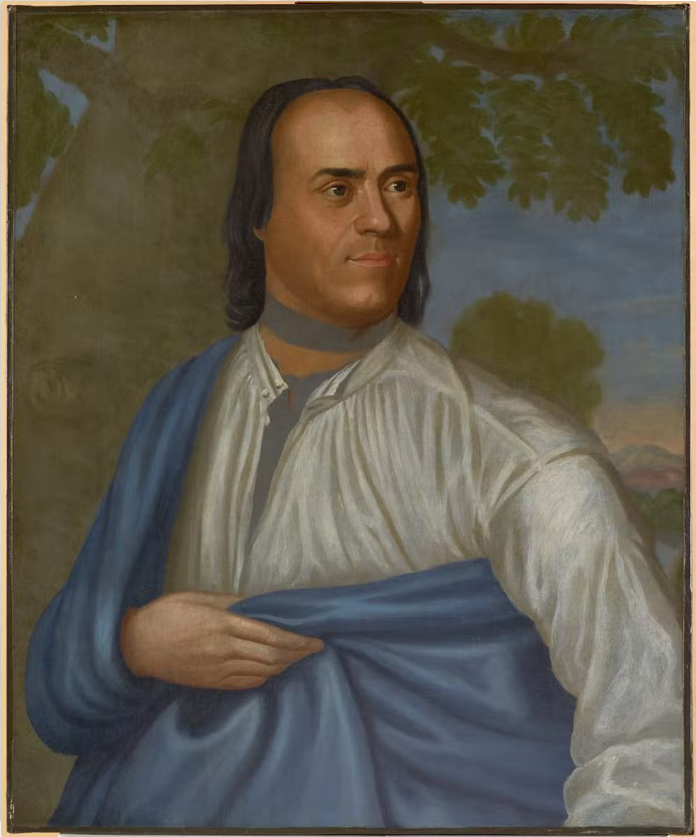
Nathaniel Smibert, Samson Occom (c. 1750).

Occom became a teacher, preacher, and judge among the Montaukett Native Americans in Montauk, eastern Long Island, and married Mary Fowler, a Montaukett woman. Occom helped some of the Pequot people he worked with assimilate and adopt European-style houses, dress and culture.

He was officially ordained a minister on August 30, 1759, by the presbytery of Suffolk. Occom was never paid the same salary as white preachers, although promised he would be. The Society in Scotland for Propagating Christian Knowledge also gave Occom a stipend for some time, but he lived in deep poverty for much of his life.

In 1761 and 1763, Occom traveled to the Six Nations of the Iroquois in upstate New York to preach. Winning few converts, he returned to teach at Mohegan, Connecticut, near New London. Occom mediated the conflicts between the colonists and the Native Americans due to his familiarity with colonist culture and through Occom's missionary work he was recognized as a leader that strengthened Native American relations.

Wheelock had meanwhile established an Indian charity school in Lebanon, Connecticut, in 1754 with a legacy from Joshua Moor (among others). Upon Occom's return to Mohegan, Wheelock persuaded his former pupil to travel to England to raise money for the school.

Wheelock sent a letter, dated July 4, 1761, to George Whitefield, a founding minister of Methodism, and largely responsible for the Great Awakening religious revivalism in the American colonies, informing him of Occom's mission to the Oneidas, and the difficulties involved with teaching the Gospel to Indian students. He suggested that he appeal to the Earl of Dartmouth for help raising funds for Moor's charity school. In winter 1765, Occom and Nathaniel Whitaker sailed from Boston to London, and did not return until May 20, 1768. Upon their arrival Occom was introduced to George Whitefield, who hosted Occom and Whitaker at his church in London. Whitefield later introduced them to William Legge, 2nd Earl of Dartmouth, who became a major contributor to the project.

He preached his way across Britain from February 16, 1766, to July 22, 1767, delivering between 300 and 400 sermons, drawing large crowds wherever he went, and raising over £12,000 for Wheelock's project. King George III donated 200 pounds, and William Legge, Earl of Dartmouth, subscribed 50 guineas. However, Occom, on his return, learned that Wheelock had failed to care for Occom's wife and children while he was away. Furthermore, Wheelock moved to New Hampshire and used the funds raised to establish Dartmouth College (named after the English earl) for the education of the sons of American colonists, rather than Native Americans as had originally been promised to Occom. Even 200 years later, the college had graduated less than 20 Native American students. The trajectory changed in 1970 when Dartmouth's 13th president, John Kemeny, officially recommitted the institution to its original mission. He established aggressive recruitment strategies, launched the Native American Program, and founded the Dartmouth Department of Native American and Indigenous Studies. Since this 1970 rededication, more than 1,200 Indigenous students have graduated from the college.

In 1764, Occom opposed the sale of tribal lands and was involved in the “Mason Controversy,” a long lasting dispute over land between the colonists and the Mohegans. The Mohegans formed an alliance with the Mason family to plead a case for the governor of Connecticut to give back the lands to the Mohegans. When Occom came back to Mohegans, he expressed his support for the Mason family and the Mohegans which caused the missionaries to make threats such as taking away his preacher's license and to stop financing his missionary work. Some colonists also started to spread negative rumors about Occom, suggesting that he was an alcoholic who had converted to Christianity just for show. In a 1769 letter, Wheelock wrote to Occom about a rumor about Occom being an alcoholic. The rumor hurt Occom's reputation after Occom's success in fundraising money in England. Wheelock suggested that Occom truly did not care for Christianity. The stereotype of the drunk Indian was projected onto Occom and undermined his missionary work. Wheelock benefited from the defamation of Occom as Wheelock regained his authority. Wheelock's letter further put forth the concept of fake conversion onto Occom and that Occom was not to be trusted as a preacher.

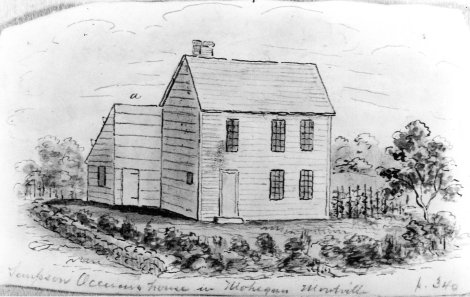
Occom's Mohegan home, by John W. Barber

In 1768, Occom wrote A Short Narrative of My Life, a ten-page manuscript now held in Dartmouth College's archive collection; however, it was not published until 1982. The document expands upon a single-page biography that Occom wrote before his preaching tour of England and Scotland. Occom also published Sermon at the Execution of Moses Paul and A Choice Collection of Hymns and Spiritual Songs in 1774. All of these documents provide a very different perspective on the relations between colonists and Native Americans from Mary Rowlandson's narrative of her captivity in similar areas a century earlier.

== Later life ==
Upon his return from England, Occom rejoined and lived with his Mohegan people. After Wheelock's betrayal, Occom, together with his son-in-law Joseph Johnson (who had been a messenger for General George Washington during the American Revolution), Montauk brothers-in-law David and Jacob Fowler, and others, worked to organize the Christian (or “praying”) Indians of New England and Long Island into a new tribe in Upstate New York. On October 4, 1774, the Oneida ceded land to the East Coast Indians and by 1775, the initial group had begun to migrate. Burnt out at the outset of the Revolution, many went to Massachusetts to live among the Stockbridge until their return in 1785. Occom, Johnson, and David Fowler led the people back to rebuild their settlement (near what is now Waterville, New York) called Brothertown.

The Oneida also invited other Christian Indians to live with them, namely the Stockbridge Mohican from land claimed by western Massachusetts and two Lenape groups from the southern New Jersey area. The Mohicans founded what they called New Stockbridge in New York, near Oneida Lake. Occom not only ensured that these villages received official civil charters in 1787, but also evicted white settlers from Brothertown on April 12, 1792.

Occom died on July 14, 1792, in New Stockbridge. He is said to be buried just off Bogusville Hill Road outside of Deansboro, New York.

== Legacy ==
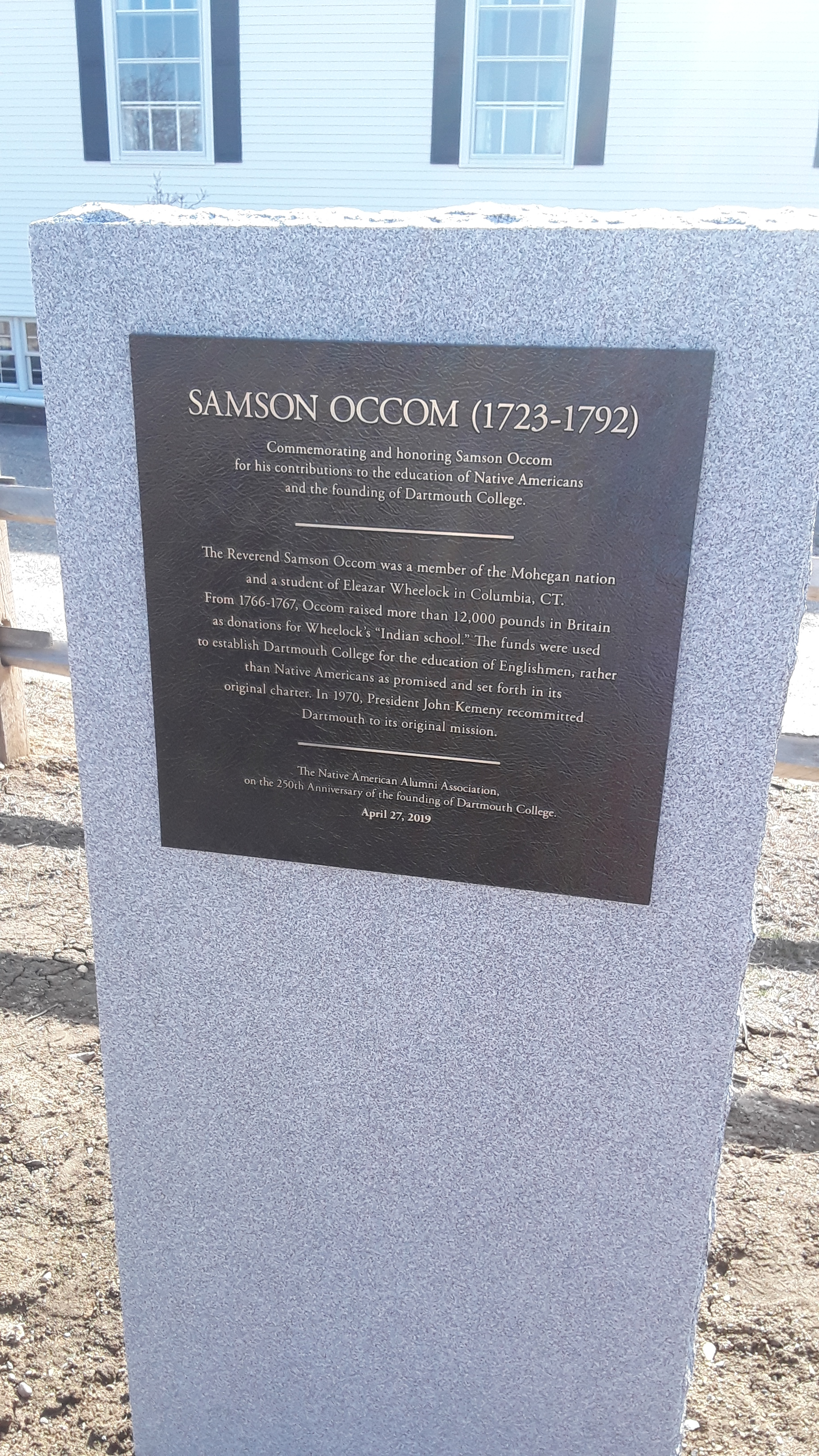
Memorial to Samson Occom, Moor's Charity School, Columbia, CT

After Occom's death, during the 1820s, many Brothertown Indians and some Oneida accepted payment from New York State for their land and were removed to what is now known as the town of Brothertown in Calumet County, Wisconsin. In the modern era, the Brothertown Indians petitioned the federal government for recognition as a tribe, but were denied and have appealed.

In World War II, the United States Liberty ship SS Samson Occom was named in his honor.

Several locations around Dartmouth College in Hanover, New Hampshire, are named after Occom, including Occom Pond and Occom Ridge on the college campus's northern edge, at 43.71099°N 72.28783°W. The Native American Studies program has a Samson Occom professorship. The Occom Commons community space is part of Goldstein Hall in the recently opened McLaughlin Residential Cluster. Eastern Connecticut State University in Willimantic, Connecticut, also named a residence hall for upperclassmen after Occom.

The Norwich, Connecticut neighborhood of Occum is named for Samson Occom.

The Brothertown Indians celebrate Samson Occom Day as an official tribal holiday every July 14.

On April 27, 2019, the Native American Alumni Association of Dartmouth College erected a memorial on the site of Moor's Charity School in Columbia, CT, "commemorating and honoring Samson Occom for his contributions to the education of Native Americans and the founding of Dartmouth College."

== Works of Samson Occom ==
- A Choice Collection of Hymns and Spiritual Songs, New London, Connecticut: Press of Thomas and Samual Green, 1774.
- A Sermon Preached at the Execution of Moses Paul, An Indian Who Was Executed at New Haven on the 2nd of September 1772 for the Murder of Mr. Moses Cook, late of Waterbury, on the 7th of December 1771, New Haven: Press of Thomas and Samual Green, 1772.
- "A Short Narrative of My Life". The Elders Wrote: An Anthology of Early Prose by North American Indians 1768-1931. Ed. Bernd Peyer. Berlin: Dietrich Reimer Verlag, 1982 [1762], 12–18. (This work has recently been published in The Norton Anthology of American Literature.)
- Journals, 1754 and 1786(?), Unpublished manuscript in collection of New London County Historical Society.
- Herbs and Roots, Unpublished manuscript in collection of New London County Historical Society.
- The Collected Writings of Samson Occom, Mohegan. Ed. Joanna Brooks. New York: Oxford University Press, 2006.

== See also ==
- Native American temperance activists
- John Brainerd (missionary) — Reverend missionary to the Indian nations of New Jersey in the 18th century
- David Brainerd — Reverend missionary to the Indian nations of New Jersey in the 18th century

== Bibliography ==
- Brooks, Joanna, ed. The Collected Writings of Samson Occom, Mohegan: Leadership and Literature in Eighteenth-Century Native America. Oxford: Oxford University Press, 2006.
- Love, William DeLoss (1899). Samson Occom and the Christian Indians of New England. Boston: The Pilgrim Press.
- Thornton, Henry (2026). "Samuel Occom". Southern Methodist University.
- Peyer, Bernd (Autumn–Winter 1982). "Samson Occom: Mohegan Missionary and Writer of the 18th Century". American Indian Quarterly. 6 (3/4): 208–217. doi:10.2307/1183629. JSTOR 1183629.
- Wheelock, Elezar (1761). "Eleazar Wheelock, letter, to George Whitefield, 1761 July 4". Letter to George Whitefield. Dartmouth University Library.
- Orson, Diane (May 3, 2022). "After 200 years, Dartmouth returns papers of Native American who helped establish the college". New Hampshire Public Radio.
