= A Short Narrative of My Life =

Autobiography of Samson Occom

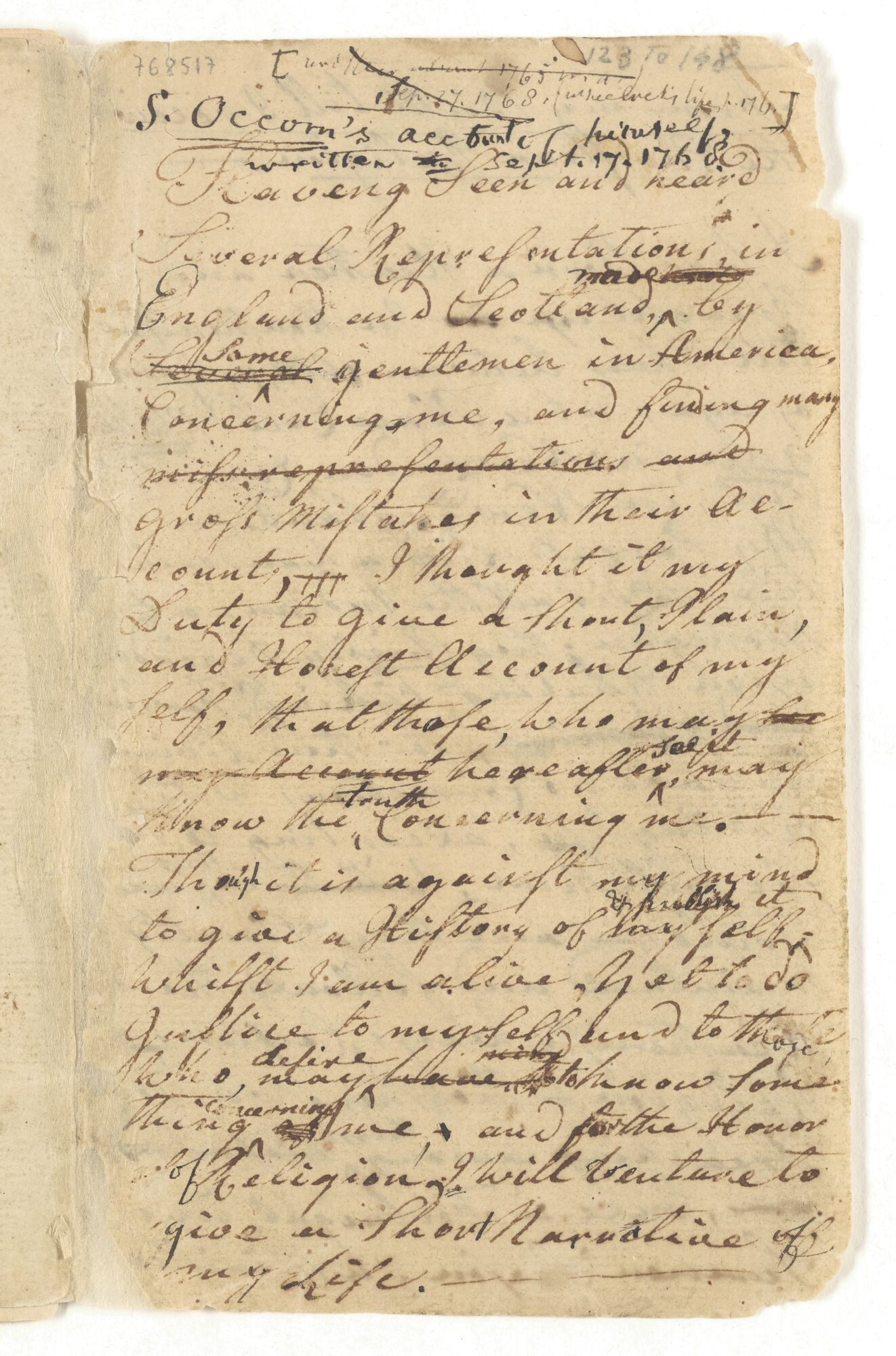
- First page of the 1768 manuscript
- Author: Samson Occom
- Language: English
- Genre: Autobiography
- Publication date: 1982

A Short Narrative of My Life is an autobiographical account by Rev. Samson Occom (1723–1792) and is one of the earliest English language writings by a Native American. It was written in 1768 and first published in 1982.

== Composition and publication ==
The extant manuscript is a 26-page notebook containing Occom's second draft of the composition. This version includes handwritten annotations, some reflecting Occam's revisions and others added by a 19th-century editor, which reflect efforts to interpret Occom’s original handwriting. This editor also notes that it was written September 17, 1768.

It was not published until 1982, when Bernd Peyer included it in the anthology The Elders Wrote: an anthology of early prose by North American Indians, 1768-1931.

== Synopsis ==
This autobiographical narrative recounts the religious experiences and life journey of Samson Occom, beginning at age 16 when he experienced a profound spiritual awakening during a Christian minister’s preaching to his community. Inspired by the message of the minister, he decided to pursue his spiritual and academic career. He began to teach himself to read, before seeking formal instruction under the guidance of Reverend Eleazar Wheelock. Despite Occom’s intentions to stay with Wheelock briefly, he remained under his mentorship for four years. During this time, his education was supported by Wheelock’s friends and associates. However, ongoing health issues and severe eye strain eventually forced him to discontinue his studies.

In defiance of his poor health, Samson remained determined to serve his people. He traveled among several Native communities offering his instruction and teachings, and eventually settled in Montauk, Long Island. There he taught in school, led religious meetings, cared for the ill, and served as both minister and mediator for the local tribes. On top of these responsibilities, he had a growing family to support, stating, “I took all opportunities to get something to feed my family daily.” To provide for them, Samson turned to farming, hunting, fishing, and took on any work he could find.

His devotion and labor continued for over a decade, often under immense hardship and with inadequate financial compensation. He notes with pain the unfair treatment he received compared to white missionaries, attributing this disparity to racial prejudice. Despite these challenges, he remained committed to his mission, driven by compassion for his people and a deep sense of spiritual calling.
