= Nathaniel Smibert =

American painter (1734–1756)

Nathaniel Smibert (January 20, 1734 – November 8, 1756), was an American colonial artist in Boston, Province of Massachusetts, active in the mid-18th century. He is considered to be the first portrait painter in America.

== Biography ==
Born in Boston in 1734, Nathaniel Smibert trained as a painter with his father, artist John Smibert. He painted several portraits, notably of Ezra Stiles, architect Peter Harrison, and Dorothy Wendell (in the Collection of Dr John L Hale, Boston). Smibert died young in 1756, at the age of twenty-two.

== Gallery ==
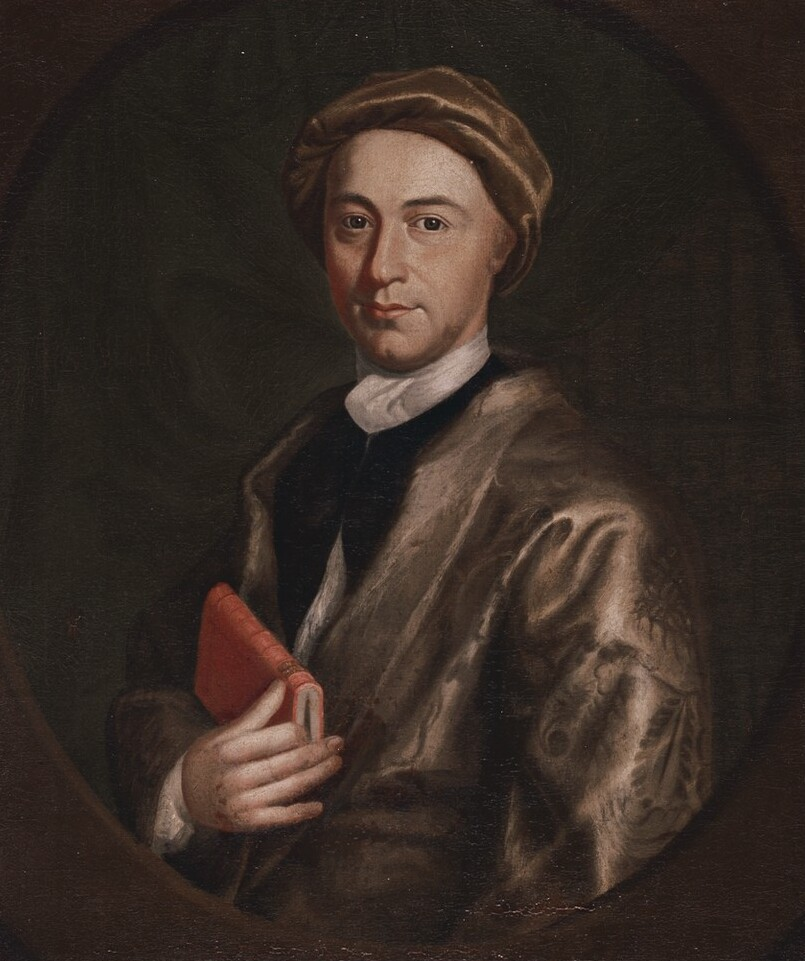
Portrait of Ezra Stiles (1756)

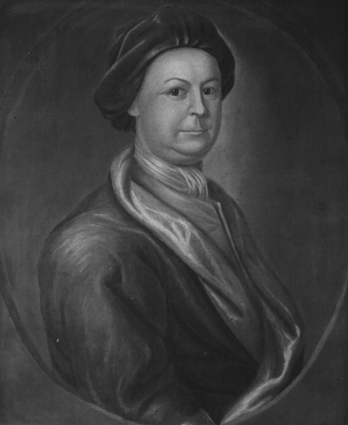
Portrait of John Lovell

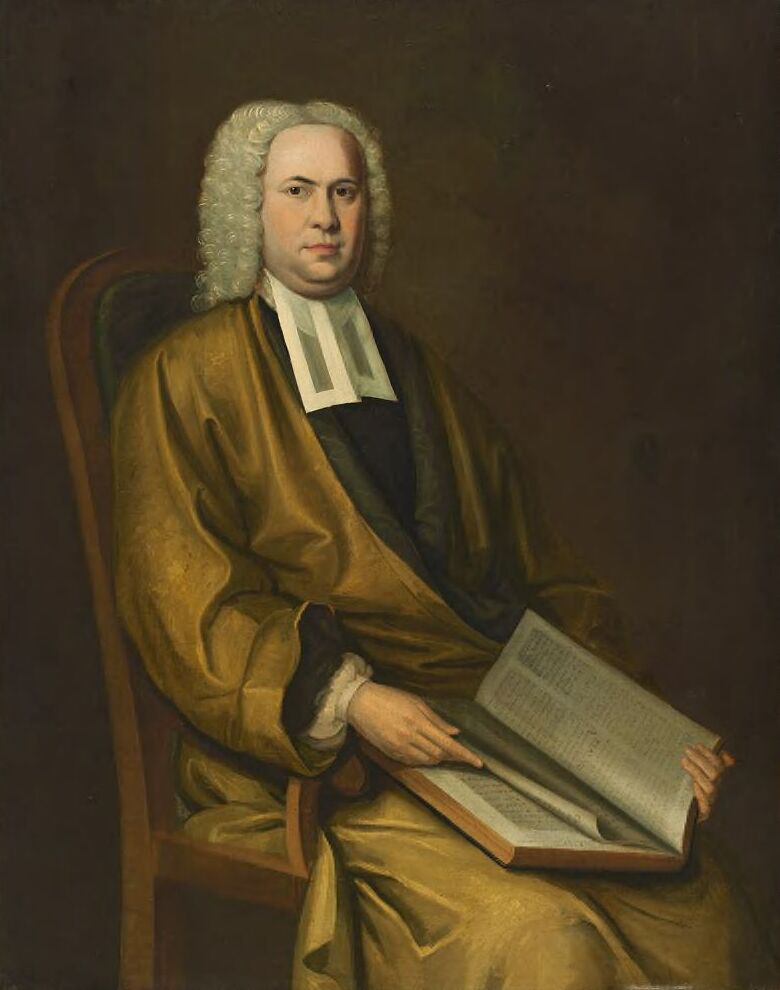
Portrait of a Cleric (c. 1755–1756)
