= List of Native Americans of the United States =

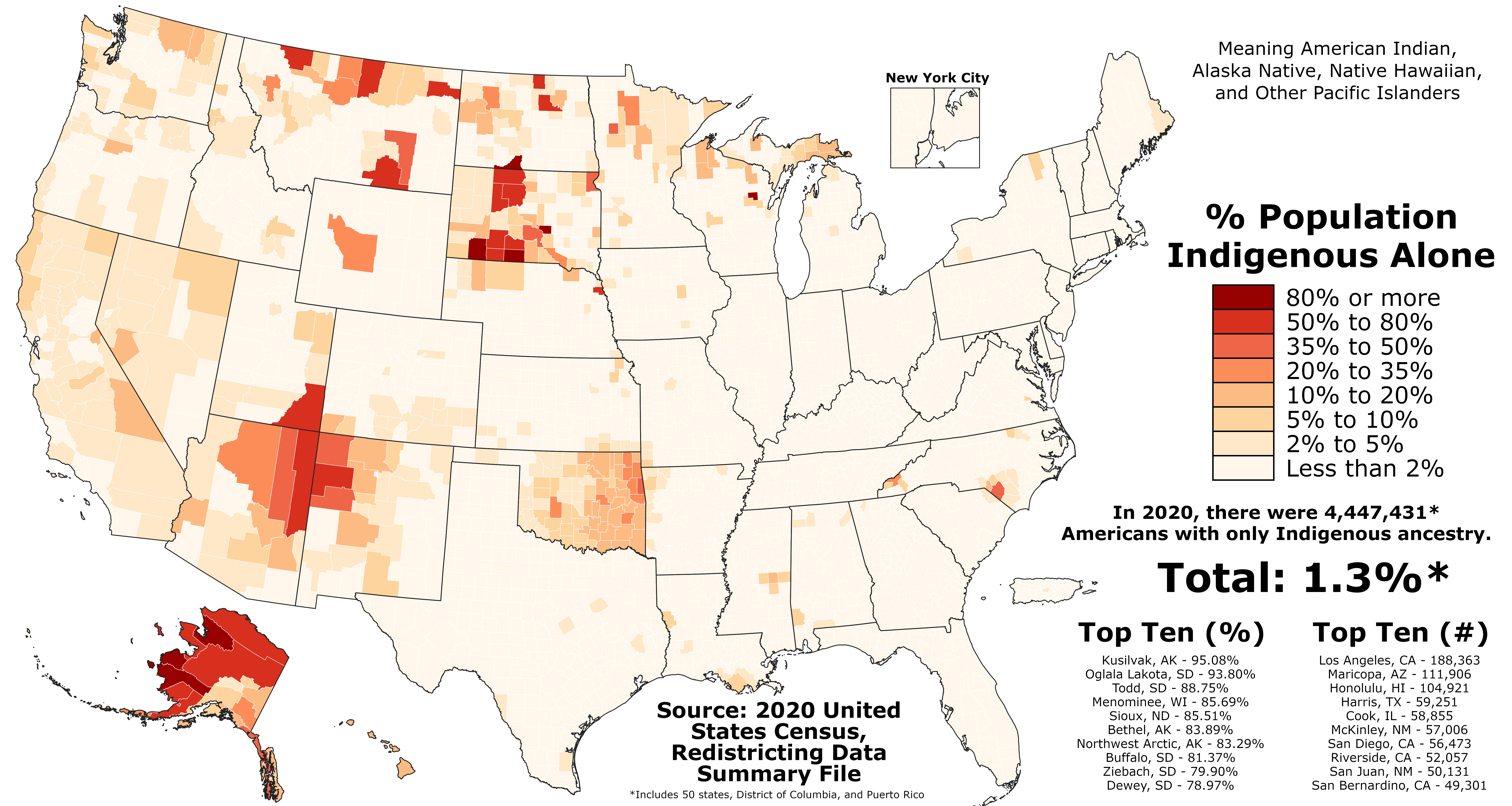
Proportion of Indigenous Americans in each county of the fifty states, the District of Columbia, and Puerto Rico as of the 2020 United States Census

This list of Native Americans is of notable individuals who are Native Americans in the United States, including Alaska Natives and American Indians.

Native American identity is a complex and contested issue. The Bureau of Indian Affairs defines Native American as being American Indian or Alaska Native. Legally, being Native American is defined as being enrolled in a federally recognized tribe including Alaska Native villages. Ethnologically, factors such as culture, history, language, religion, and familial kinships can influence Native American identity. All individuals on this list should have Native American ancestry. Historical figures might predate tribal enrollment practices and would be included based on ethnological tribal membership.

== Artists ==
- Elsie Allen, Cloverdale Pomo basketweaver
- Marcus Amerman, Choctaw Nation of Oklahoma multimedia artist
- Annie Antone, Tohono O'odham basketweaver
- Spencer Asah, Kiowa artist
- James Auchiah, Kiowa artist
- Martha Berry, Cherokee Nation beadwork artist
- Kelly Church, (Pottawatomi/Odawa/Ojibwe) basket maker, painter, and educator
- Amanda Crowe, Eastern Band Cherokee woodcarver and educator
- Dennis Cusick, Tuscarora painter, ca. 1800–1824
- Juanita Growing Thunder Fogarty, Fort Peck Assiniboine and Sioux quillworker and beadwork artist
- Edmonia Lewis, African-American/Mississauga Ojibwe-descendent sculptor
- Litefoot, Cherokee Nation actor, hip hop artist
- María Martínez, San Ildefonso Pueblo potter
- Nampeyo, Hopi-Tewa potter
- Nora Naranjo-Morse, Santa Clara Pueblo artist
- Jeri Redcorn, Caddo/Citizen Potawatomi b. ca. 1940) potter
- Lawney Reyes, Confederated Colville Tribes (Sinixt) artist, author, and curator
- Carol Lee Sanchez, Laguna Pueblo author and artist

== Chiefs and other leaders ==
- Ahaya (ca. 1710 – 1783), first recorded chief of the Alachua band of the Seminole tribe.
- Attakullakulla, Cherokee chief
- Awashonks, Sakonnet 17th century female chief
- Bill John Baker, Principal Chief of the Cherokee Nation
- Black Hawk, Sauk chief
- Black Kettle, Cheyenne chief
- Andrew Blackbird, Odawa leader, historian, and author
- Kimberly M. Blaeser, (White Earth Ojibwe) author and poet
- Elias Boudinot, Cherokee leader, journalist and publisher
- Billy Bowlegs, Seminole chief
- Joseph Brant, Mohawk leader
- Carlos (Calusa) (died 1567), king of the Calusa people of Southwest Florida
- Canonicus, Narragansett chief
- Chief Gall, (Hunkpapa Lakota) chief
- Cinon Duro Mataweer chief
- Cochise, Chiricahua Apache chief
- Colorow, Ute chief
- Cornplanter, Seneca chief and diplomat
- Crazy Horse, Oglala Lakota chief
- Cuerno Verde, Spanish name for Tavibo Naritgant, a leader of the Comanche, likely of the Kotsoteka Comanche, in the late 18th century.
- Logan Fontenelle, Omaha chief and interpreter
- Geronimo, Chiricahua Apache leader
- Captain Jack, Modoc chief
- Red Jacket, Seneca Nation chief
- Overton James, Chickasaw, educator, former Governor of the Chickasaw Nation
- Old Chief Joseph, Nez Perce former chieftain, father of Chief Joseph
- Chief Joseph, Nez Percé chief, war leader, and humanitarian
- Juanillo, chief of the Guale Nchiefdom
- Betty Mae Tiger Jumper, first female chief of the Seminole Tribe of Florida, also a publisher
- Hiawatha, Onondaga-Mohawk chief was credited as the founder of the Iroquois confederacy
- John Horse, African-American leader of the Black Seminole.
- David Hill (Mohawk), Mohawk chief during the American Revolution
- Keokuk, (Sauk, Meskwaki) chief
- King Hagler, Catawba chief
- Little Turkey was First Beloved Man of the Cherokee people, becoming the first Principal Chief of a united Cherokee Nation in 1794
- Little Turtle, Miami chief
- Lone Wolf the Elder, Kiowa chief
- Lone Wolf the Younger, Kiowa leader
- Major Ridge, Cherokee chief, led Lighthorse Patrol and signed the Treaty of New Echota.
- Mangas Coloradas, Apache chief
- Wilma Mankiller, Cherokee Nation chief
- Manuelito, Navajo chief, diplomat, and warrior.
- Massasoit, Wampanoag chief
- Alexander McGillivray, Muscogee Creek Nation chief
- William McIntosh, Muscogee Creek Nation chief
- Peter McQueen, Muscogee Creek Nation chief, prophet, trader and warrior from Talisi (Tallassee, among the Upper Towns in present-day Alabama).
- Metacomet, Wampanoag chief
- Miantonomo, Narragansett chief
- Olotoraca (1548–1573), subchief of a tribe of Fort San Mateo, Florida.
- Oratam, sachem of the Hackensack Indians
- Osceola, Seminole leader
- Chief Oshkosh, Menominee leader
- Chief Ouray, Ute Tribe leader
- Opechancanough, Pamunkey chief
- Quaiapen, Narragansett/Niantic sunksqua (female sachem/chief)
- Quanah Parker, Comanche chief
- Pawhuska, Osage Chief
- Thomas Perryman, Creek leader in Georgia
- Peter Chartier, Pekowi chief
- Powhatan, Pamunkey chief
- Chief Pontiac, Odawa chief
- Red Cloud, Oglala Lakota chief
- Chief G. Anne Richardson (Chief of the Rappahannock tribe – first female chief in Virginia since the 18th century)
- Qualchan, 19th-century Yakama chief
- John Ross, Cherokee chief
- Juan Sabeata, Jumano chief
- Greg Sarris, Federated Indians of Graton Rancheria tribal chairman, author, and professor
- Sitting Bull, Hunkpapa Lakota chief
- Chad Smith, former Principal Chief of Cherokee Nation
- Samoset (Abenaki, 1590–1653), first Indigenous American leader to contact the Pilgrims in Plymouth, Massachusetts (March 16, 1621)
- Smohalla, Wanapum chief and religious leader
- Saturiwa, chief of the Saturiwa (a Mocama tribe of Timucua people, located in St. Johns River in Florida), during the 16th century
- Seattle, Suquamish/Duwamish leader
- Standing Bear, Ponca chief
- Touch the Clouds, (Mahpia Icahtagya), Teton Lakota chief
- Tuskaloosa, paramount chief of a Mississippian chiefdom in Alabama
- Uncas, Mohegan chief
- Victorio, Chiricahua Apache chief
- Weetamoo, Pocasset Wampanoag, 17th-century female chief
- White Plume, Kaw chief
- Yellow Bird, Walla Walla chief
- Yonaguska, Cherokee chief
- William Weatherford, Muscogee Creek chief
- White Hair (Pawhuska), the name of several Osage chiefs

== Warriors and military ==
- Chainbreaker, Seneca war chief
- Roy Benavidez, (Yaqui), decorated U.S. Army Master sergeant and Medal of Honor recipient
- Ollokot, Nez Perce war chieftain
- Ira Hayes, (Akimel O'odham) one of five Marines, along with a United States Navy corpsman, immortalized in the iconic photograph of the flag raising on Iwo Jima
- John Horse (Black Seminole), warrior in the Second Seminole War in Florida
- Kilma S. Lattin, (Pala Band of Mission Indians), decorated U.S. Army former First Lieutenant and Soldiers Medal recipient
- Clayton J. Lonetree, Winnebago/Navajo U.S. Marine and convicted KGB spy
- Louis Gonzaga Mendez, Jr. (Navajo-descent), highly decorated WWII United States Army officer of the 82nd Airborne Division
- Ely S. Parker, (Seneca) U.S. Army Brigadier General
- Lori Piestewa, Hopi veteran, died in the 2003 invasion of Iraq
- Popé, Ohkay Owingeh religious and military leader
- Santa Anna (Comanche war chief)
- Sonuk Mikko, Seminole, Captain in the Indian Home Guard during the American Civil War often referred to as Billy Bowlegs
- Tecumseh, Shawnee warrior and statesman
- William Clyde Thompson, Texas Choctaw leader who fought against the Dawes Commission for Choctaw enrollment
- Luis Tupatu, Pueblo leader of the northern pueblos following the Pueblo Revolt
- Nancy Ward, Cherokee warrior, diplomat, and "Beloved Woman"
- Washakie, Shoshone warrior, diplomat, chief, leader
- Stand Watie, Cherokee leader and a brigadier general of the Confederate States Army during the American Civil War
- John Watts (also known as Young Tassel), a leader of the Chickamauga Cherokee (or "Lower Cherokee") during the Cherokee-American wars
- Dragging Canoe, Cherokee war chief
- Pushmataha, Choctaw chief and U.S. Army Brigadier General
- José Naranjo (Santa Clara Pueblo), warrior who fought in the Spanish troops against the Apaches and participated in the Villasur expedition

== Politicians ==
- Bill Anoatubby, (Chickasaw Nation), Governor of the Chicksaw Nation since 1987
- Diane E. Benson, (Tlingit) politician, inspirational speaker, poet and author
- Lisa Johnson Billy, Chickasaw Nation, Oklahoma State Legislator and Chickasaw Tribal Legislator
- Ada E. Brown, Choctaw Nation, Federal Judge in the United States District Court for the Northern District of Texas
- Ben Nighthorse Campbell, Northern Cheyenne chief, U.S. Representative, U.S. Senator, and silversmith
- Brad Carson, Cherokee Nation, former Democratic U.S. congressman from Oklahoma
- Holmes Colbert, Chickasaw government official
- Tom Cole, Chickasaw Nation, Congressman from Oklahoma
- Charles Curtis, (Kaw/Osage/Prairie Band Potawatomi) U.S. Senator and 31st Vice President of the United States
- Sharice Davids, Ho-Chunk, U.S. Representative from Kansas
- Affie Burnside Ellis, Navajo, first Native American to serve in the Wyoming Senate
- Peggy Flanagan, White Earth Nation (Ojibwe), Lieutenant Governor of Minnesota
- Todd Gloria, Tlingit, 37th mayor of San Diego, first person of color and openly queer to do so.
- Deb Haaland, Laguna Pueblo, U.S. Representative from New Mexico, 54th United States Secretary of the Interior
- Diane Humetewa, Hopi, Judge of the United States District Court for the District of Arizona, former U.S. Attorney for the District of Arizona
- Enoch Kelly Haney, (Seminole Nation of Oklahoma), tribal leader, Oklahoma state legislator, and artist
- Keith Harper, Cherokee Nation of Oklahoma, U.S. representative to the United Nations Human Rights Council in Geneva
- Larry Echo Hawk, Pawnee Nation, former Democratic Attorney General of Idaho and former United States Assistant Secretary of the Interior for Indian Affairs
- Yvette Herrell, Cherokee Nation, Congresswoman from New Mexico
- Chuck Hoskin, Cherokee Nation, member of the Oklahoma House of Representatives from the 6th district
- Shane Jett, Cherokee Nation, member of the Oklahoma Senate from the 17th district
- Andi LeBeau, Northern Arapaho from Wyoming
- Myron Lizer, Navajo / Comanche, Vice President of the Navajo Nation
- Byron Mallott, (Tlingit), former Lieutenant Governor of Alaska
- Green McCurtain, Choctaw Nation chief, Vice President of the Sequoyah Constitutional Convention
- David T. McCoy, Turtle Mountain Chippewa state politician and attorney
- Markwayne Mullin, Cherokee Nation, current Secretary of Homeland Security and former congressman from Oklahoma
- Mary Peltola, Yup'ik, Congresswoman from Alaska; first Alaska Native member of Congress, first woman to represent Alaska in the House, first representative from Alaska to have been born in the state
- Ben Reifel, Sicangu Lakota, activist and Congressman from South Dakota
- Michael J. Stickman, Alaska Athabascan, first Chief of the Nuwato Tribal Council
- Kimberly Teehee, Cherokee Nation, Democratic White House Senior Policy Advisor for Native American Affairs
- Claire Valdez, Ysleta del Sur Pueblo state assemblymember
- James Vann, Cherokee businessman and politician
- Peterson Zah, Navajo politician

== Religious leaders ==
- William Apess, (Pequot) Methodist minister
- Black Elk, Oglala Lakota religious leader
- William "Hawk" Birdshead Episcopal Church, Spiritual Teacher
- Charles J. Chaput (Prairie Potawatomi), Roman Catholic bishop
- Neolin, (Lenni Lenape) religious leader
- George Tinker, Osage Nation theologian
- Kennekuk, Kickapoo spiritual leader
- Handsome Lake, Seneca religious leader
- Samson Occom, Mohegan clergyman
- St. David Pendleton Oakerhater, Southern Cheyenne warrior, artist, deacon, and saint in the Episcopal Church
- Oral Roberts, Choctaw Nation preacher
- John Slocum, Squaxin Island Tribe, founder of the Indian Shaker Church
- Kateri Tekakwitha, Mohawk/Algonquian convert, canonized saint in the Roman Catholic Church
- Peter the Aleut (Unangax), also known as Cungagnaq, martyr and saint in some jurisdictions of the Eastern Orthodox Church.
- Tenskwatawa, Shawnee religious leader
- Wovoka, Paiute religious leader and founder of the Ghost Dance religion

== Writers ==
- Louise Abeita, Isleta Pueblo, 1926–2014
- Richard Aitson (Kiowa/Plains Apache, 1953–2022), beadwork artist and poet
- Sherman Alexie, Spokane/Coeur d'Alene novelist and comedian
- Paula Gunn Allen, Laguna Pueblo poet, literary critic, activist, and novelist
- William Apess (Pequot, 1798–1839), Methodist minister
- Annette Arkeketa, Otoe-Missouria/Muscogee
- Jim Barnes, Choctaw editor, author, poet and founder of the Chariton Review Press
- Gloria Bird, Spokane author
- Sherwin Bitsui, Navajo poet
- Ignatia Broker, White Earth Ojibwe author
- Gregory Cajete, Santa Clara Pueblo
- Elizabeth Cook-Lynn, Crow Creek Sioux author, poet, editor, and co-founder of the Wíčazo Ša Review
- David Cusick, Tuscarora illustrator and author, ca.1780–ca.1831
- Nora Marks Dauenhauer, Tlingit author and poet
- Philip J. Deloria, Standing Rock Sioux Tribe
- Ella Cara Deloria, Yankton Dakota/Standing Rock Sioux, 1889–1971
- Vine Deloria, Jr., Yankton Dakota/Standing Rock Sioux, 1933–2005
- Natalie Diaz, Mojave poet, language activist, former professional basketball player, and educator
- Michael Dorris, Modoc writer
- Heid E. Erdrich, Turtle Mountain Ojibwe writer and poet
- Louise Erdrich, Turtle Mountain Ojibwe writer and poet
- Janice Gould, Maidu writer
- Janet Campbell Hale, Coeur d'Alene/Ktunaxa/Cree writer
- Gordon Henry, White Earth Ojibwe writer
- Linda Hogan, Chickasaw Nation poet, storyteller, academic, environmentalist and writer.
- Victoria Howard (Clackamas Chinook, c. 1865–1930), storyteller
- Joy Harjo, Muscogee Nation poet, musician, and author, US poet laureate
- Stephen Graham Jones, Blackfeet author
- Daniel Heath Justice, Cherokee Nation author
- Carole LaFavor, Ojibwe novelist and activist
- David Gene Lewis, Confederated Tribes of the Grand Ronde Community of Oregon writer, academic , activist
- Layli Long Soldier, Oglala Lakota poet, writer, feminist, artist, and activist
- John Joseph Mathews, Osage author
- Deborah A. Miranda, Esselen/Chumash author and poet
- N. Scott Momaday (Kiowa, 1934–2024) poet, author, scholar, and painter
- Irvin Morris, Navajo author
- Mourning Dove, Syilx author, 1888–1936
- Cynthia Leitich Smith, Muscogee author
- Tommy Orange, Cheyenne-Arapaho novelist and writer
- Simon J. Ortiz, Acoma Pueblo poet
- William S. Penn, Nez Perce author
- Robert L. Perea, Oglala Lakota novelist, educator, and veteran
- Susan Power, Standing Rock Dakota author
- Carter Revard, Osage Nation author and poet
- John Rollin Ridge, Cherokee author
- Wendy Rose, Hopi/Miwok author
- Jane Johnston Schoolcraft, Ojibwe author
- Leslie Marmon Silko, Laguna Pueblo-descent poet and novelist
- James Thomas Stevens, Mohawk author and educator
- Luci Tapahonso, Diné poet
- David Treuer, Leech Lake Ojibwe author
- Mark Turcotte, Turtle Mountain Ojibwe author
- Gerald Vizenor, White Earth Ojibwe writer and professor
- Anna Lee Walters, Pawnee/Otoe author
- James Welch, Blackfeet/Gros Ventre author and poet
- William S. Yellow Robe, Jr. (Fort Peck Assiniboine, 1950–2021), actor, author, director, educator, playwright, and poet
- Ray Young Bear, Meskwaki author
- Ofelia Zepeda, Tohono O'odham poet and intellectual
- Cecile Black Boy

== Television and films ==
- Irene Bedard, Iñupiaq/Yupik/Cree/Métis actress, director, producer, activist
- William "Hawk" Birdshead activist, editor, director
- Nathan Lee Chasing His Horse, Lakota actor
- Chris Eyre, Southern Cheyenne-Arapaho director and producer
- Kiowa Gordon, Hualapai actor
- Phil Lucas, Choctaw Nation of Oklahoma filmmaker, actor, writer, producer, director, and editor
- Russell Means, Oglala Lakota activist and actor
- Will Rogers, Cherokee actor and humorist
- Will Sampson, Muscogee Nation painter and actor
- Eddie Spears, Brulé Lakota actor
- Michael Spears, Brulé Lakota actor
- Luther Standing Bear, Oglala Lakota, author and actor
- Wes Studi, Cherokee Nation actor
- Sheila Tousey, Menominee actor
- Floyd Red Crow Westerman, Sisseton Dakota actor and musician

== Musicians and singers ==
- Chuck Billy, Pomo-descent singer for the thrash metal band, Testament
- William "Hawk" Birdshead
- Radmilla Cody, (Navajo) model, singer and activist
- Brent Michael Davids, Stockbridge Mohican composer and flutist
- R. Carlos Nakai, Navajo musician
- Supaman, Apsáalooke rapper
- Taboo (rapper), Shoshone-descent rapper and singer
- John Trudell, Santee Dakota, musician, poet, activist
- Frank Waln, Sicangu Lakota rapper
- Greg T. Walker, Muscogee southern rocker, Blackfoot and Lynyrd Skynyrd

== Sports ==
- Taffy Abel, (Sault Ste. Marie Chippewa), Hall of Fame NHL Hockey Player, The First Native American in the Winter Olympics (1924 Silver medal), The First Native American in the NHL (1926), Broke the NHL Color Barrier in 1926
- Ron Baker, Citizen Potawatomi NBA player with the Washington Wizards
- Notah Begay III, Navajo PGA Tour golfer
- Johnny Bench, Choctaw Hall of Fame Catcher
- Chief Bender, White Earth Ojibwe Hall of Fame pitcher
- Sam Bradford, Cherokee Nation, American football quarterback
- Gerald Brisco, Chickasaw Nation Pro Wrestler and WWE talent scout
- Jack Brisco, Chickasaw Nation Pro Wrestler, Former NWA World Champion
- Ellison "Tarzan" Brown, Narragansett U.S. Olympian/Marathon Runner
- Joba Chamberlain, Ho-Chunk pitcher for the Detroit Tigers
- Chris Chavis, Lumbee professional wrestler, Better Known As "Tatanka."
- Rod Curl, (Wintu) PGA tour golfer
- Frank Dufina (Mackinac Bands of Chippewa and Ottawa Indians), professional golfer
- Jacoby Ellsbury CRIT Navajo outfielder for the New York Yankees
- Angel Goodrich, (Cherokee Nation) WNBA basketball player
- Joe Guyon (Chippewa), American football halfback and baseball player. Won the NFL championship with the New York Giants in 1927.
- Al Hoptowit (Yakama), American football player
- Bronson Koenig, Ho-Chunk basketball player currently on an NBA two-way contract
- Ashton Locklear Artistic Gymnast of Lumbee tribe. 2014 World Champion (Team), 2 x 2014 Pan American Champion (Team, Uneven Bars), 2 x 2016 Pacific Rim Champion (Team, Uneven Bars)
- Kyle Lohse, Nomlaki pitcher, Milwaukee Brewers
- Edward "Wahoo" McDaniel, Choctaw/Chickasaw professional wrestler
- Billy Mills, Oglala Lakota athlete
- Anthony Seigler, Navajo, MLB player
- Shoni Schimmel, Confederated Tribes of the Umatilla Indian Reservation, WNBA player
- Sonny Sixkiller, Cherokee Nation American football quarterback
- Doug Smith (Niantic/Narragansett), Major League Baseball pitcher
- Andrew Sockalexis (Penobscot), U.S.Olympian and marathon runner
- Louis Sockalexis (Penobscot), Major League Baseball player
- Jim Thorpe (Sac and Fox Nation), Olympic Gold medalist in track and field, gridiron football and baseball player
- Chris Wondolowski, (Kiowa), soccer player for the San Jose Earthquakes and United States national team
- Kerry Werner, (Kiowa), cyclist
- Lyle Thompson, (Onondaga), pro Lacrosse player
- Jim Ross, (Cherokee Nation), WWE wrestling announcer

== Activists ==
- Dennis Banks, Leech Lake Ojibwe activist, teacher, lecturer, author and co-founder of the American Indian Movement
- William "Hawk" Birdshead activist
- Mary Brave Bird, Sicangu Lakota activist. She was a member of the American Indian Movement during the 1970s and participated in some of their most publicized events.
- Clyde Bellecourt White Earth Ojibwe activist and co-founder of the American Indian Movement
- Carter Camp, Ponca activist
- Don Coyhis, Mohican, sobriety leader and mental health activist, lecturer and author. Founder of Wellbriety, a holistic approach that emphasizes community support for individuals as well as a return to cultural roots for Native American communities.
- Billy Frank Jr., Nisqually, environmental leader and treaty rights. He was the founder and chairman, Northwest Indian Fisheries Commission
- Winona LaDuke, White Earth Ojibwe environmental activist and writer. She was known for her work on tribal land claims and preservation, as well as sustainable development.
- Susan LaFlesche Picotte, Omaha/Ponca/Iowa activist, first female Native American physician. She campaigned for public health and for the formal, legal allotment of land to members of the Omaha tribe.
- Susette LaFlesche Tibbles, Omaha/Ponca/Iowa spokesperson for Native American rights
- Katherine Smith, (Navajo) activist and defender of Navajo lands
- Betty Osceola, Miccosukee educator, conservationist, anti-fracking, and clean water advocate in the Florida Everglades
- Deborah Parker (Tulalip Tribes, born 1970), activist and Tulalip Tribes' vice-chairwoman from 2012 to 2015 Parker campaigned for the reauthorization and for the inclusion of provisions which gave tribal courts jurisdiction over violent crimes against women and families involving non–Native Americans on tribal lands.
- Leonard Peltier, Turtle Mountain Chippewa/Lakota activist. A member of the American Indian Movement (AIM), he is imprisoned for first-degree murder for the shooting of two Federal Bureau of Investigation (FBI) agents during a 1975 conflict on the Pine Ridge Indian Reservation
- Elizabeth Peratrovich, Tlingit civil rights activist. Peratrovich and her husband were instrumental in the successful Alaska Native Sisterhood and Alaska Native Brotherhood campaign against racial discrimination in Alaska, culminating in the 1945 enactment of the Anti-Discrimination Act.
- Lawrence Plamondon, Grand Traverse Odawa/Ojibwe activist and storyteller. He helped found the White Panther Party. He was the first hippie to be listed on the FBI's Ten Most Wanted Fugitives list. Plamondon's father was half-Odawa and his mother was part-Ojibwe.
- D'Arcy McNickle, Salish Kootenai author, activist, and anthropologist
- Zitkala-Sa, Yankton Dakota writer and activist. She was co-founder of the National Council of American Indians, supporting Native civil rights. In addition, she served as its president until her death in 1938. She wrote several books about the Native American cultures and is one of the most influential Native American activists of the twentieth century.
- Simon Pokagon, Pokagon Potawatomi author and Native American advocate.
- Leopold Pokagon, Pokagon Potawatomi storyteller and activist. He tried to protect and promote the Potawatomi communities living in the St. Joseph River Valley and their lands.
- Luana Reyes, Confederated Colville Tribes (Sinixt) health activist and educator, 1933–2001
- Sarah Winnemucca, Northern Paiute advocate for the rights of Native Americans and served US forces as a messenger, interpreter, and guide, and as a teacher for imprisoned Native Americans. She also wrote the "first known autobiography written by a Native American woman."

== Linguists and interpreters ==
- Jessie Little Doe Baird (Mashpee Wampanoag, born 1963), linguist and preserver of the Massachusett language
- Hobomok, Wampanoag interpreter
- Don Luis (died 1571), Kiskiack or Paspahegh guide and interpreter for a party of Jesuit missionaries in Virginia
- Joseph James and Joseph James, Jr., Kaw/Osage interpreters and guides
- Toby Riddle (1848–1920), Modoc interpreter and diplomat
- Sacajawea, Shoshone interpreter
- John Sassamon, Massachusett, interpreter
- Sequoyah (Cherokee), inventor of the Cherokee syllabary
- Squanto (c. 1585–November 1622), also known as Tisquantum, last surviving Patuxet, interpreter for the Pilgrims in Plymouth, Massachusetts
- Ots-Toch , Mohawk, interpreter between New Netherland and the Mohawk peoples.

== Journalists and columnists ==
- Charlie LeDuff, Sault Ste. Marie Chippewa journalist, writer, and media personality
- Rob Capriccioso, Sault Ste. Marie Tribe of Chippewa Indians, journalist and writer
- Terri Crawford Hansen, Ho-Chunk/Potawatomi journalist, and author
- John Christian Hopkins, Narragansett people journalist, author
- Jim Northrup, Fond du Lac Ojibwe columnist and political writer
- Willie Ottogary, Northwestern Shoshone journalist and leader.
- Will Rogers, Jr., Cherokee Nation journalist and politician
- Mark Trahant, Shoshone-Bannock, print and broadcast journalist, and author

== Academics ==
- Buffalo Bird Woman, Hidatsa woman
- Gregory Cajete, Santa Clara Pueblo ethnobotanist, author, and educator
- Ishi, Yana educator and last member of his tribe
- Francis LaFlesche, Omaha/Ponca/Iowa ethnologist and author
- Robert J. Conley, Cherokee author
- Vine Deloria, Jr., Yankton Dakota/Standing Rock Nakota theologian, historian, writer and activist
- Charles Eastman, Santee Dakota author, physician and helped found the Boy Scouts of America.
- LeAnne Howe, Choctaw Nation of Oklahoma author and scholar
- Joseph Marshall III, Lakota educator and author
- Devon A. Mihesuah, Choctaw Nation historian, author, and editor
- Joe Medicine Crow, Crow Nation anthropologist
- Nila NorthSun, Shoshone/Ojibwe author and historian
- Luana Ross, Confederated Salish and Kootenai Tribes sociologist and author
- Delphine Red Shirt, Oglala writer and chair of OCIDWIP at the United Nations
- Richard Twiss, Sicangu Lakota educator and author
- Waziyatawin, Wahpetunwan Dakota historian, educator, and author

== Scientists ==
- Fred Begay, Navajo nuclear physicist
- Karletta Chief, Navajo soil scientist
- Kathleen R. Johnson, Grand Traverse Band of Ottawa and Chippewa Indians, paleoclimatologist
- Mary G. Ross, Cherokee Nation engineer
- Krystal Tsosie, Navajo geneticist and bioethicist
- Maria Yellow Horse Brave Heart, Hunkpapa/Oglala Lakota social scientist who developed the concept of historical trauma

== Other ==
- Lori Alvord, surgeon, first Diné woman to ever become board certified in surgery
- George Bent, Cheyenne, soldier, warrior, interpreter, and cultural informant
- Polly Cooper, Oneida Tribe aid to the Continental Army during the American Revolution at Valley Forge
- Jesse Cornplanter, Seneca author and artist
- Leonard Crow Dog, Sicangu Lakota medicine man, activist, and author
- Pierre Cruzatte, Omaha member of the Lewis and Clark Expedition.
- Deganawida (Haudenosaunee), founder of the Iroquois Confederacy, more respectfully called The Great Peacemaker
- Larry EchoHawk, Pawnee head of the BIA, former Attorney General of Idaho
- John Herrington, Chickasaw Nation NASA astronaut
- James and Ernie, Navajo comedy duo
- Maude Kegg, Mille Lacs Ojibwe writer, folk artist, and cultural interpreter
- Mountain Wolf Woman, Ho-Chunk autobiographer
- Owl Woman, Cheyenne negotiator, peacemaker, Colorado Women's Hall of Fame
- Pocahontas, aka Matoaka, Powhatan mediator with the earliest colonists in Jamestown
- Rattling Blanket Woman (Miniconjou), mother of Crazy Horse
- Paul Chaat Smith, Comanche/Choctaw, writer, Associate Curator of the National Museum of the American Indian
- Maria Tallchief, Osage Nation ballerina
- Marjorie Tallchief, Osage Nation ballerina
- Randy'L He-dow Teton, Shoshone-Bannock, model for the US Sacagawea dollar
- Tsali, Eastern Cherokee warrior, chief, and martyr

== See also ==
- List of Principal Chiefs of the Cherokee
- Leading chief of the Seminoles
- List of Lumbees
- American Indians of Iowa
- List of Native American artists from Oklahoma
- List of Native American leaders of the Indian Wars
- List of Native American Medal of Honor recipients
- List of Native American temperance activists
- List of Native American women of the United States
- List of Indigenous artists of the Americas
- List of Indigenous writers of the Americas
- Pretendian
