= List of Lumbees =

This is a list of notable Lumbee people, including members of the Lumbee Tribe of North Carolina.

== List ==
- Pamela Brewington Cashwell, Secretary of the North Carolina Department of Natural and Cultural Resources
- Dean Chavers, Ph.D., Director of Catching the Dream, formerly called the Native American Scholarship Fund.
- Ben Chavis, Ph.D., author, and advocate of high-quality urban education. From 2000, he was an early leader of Oakland's American Indian Public Charter School. It won a National Blue Ribbon Award in 2007. He was indicted in March 2017 on six felony counts for money laundering and mail fraud. In 2019, all original federal charges were dropped.
- Chris Chavis, professional wrestler.
- Anybody Killa (aka ABK), hip hop artist from Detroit, MI signed to Psycopathic Records whose parents are Lumbee from North Carolina
- Kenwin Cummings, NFL player (linebacker); attended Wingate University
- Charles Graham, member of the North Carolina General Assembly.
- Johnny Hunt, Southern Baptist clergyman, senior pastor, former national president of the Southern Baptist Convention.
- Ashton Locklear, elite artistic gymnast, 2014 world champion with the United States team, 2016 Olympic Team Alternate and 2017 World Championship team member
- Gene Locklear, Major League Baseball player with the Cincinnati Reds, San Diego Padres and two other teams.
- Jarrod Lowery, state legislator.
- John Lowery, tribal leader and state legislator.
- Julian Pierce, lawyer. In 1988, Pierce ran for a newly created Superior Court Judgeship in Robeson County but was shot and killed at home. Ballot counts gave the victory to Pierce. He would have been the first Native American to hold the position of Superior Court Judge in the state.
- Jana Mashonee (born Jana Sampson), two-time Grammy-nominated singer. She has won 10 Nammy Awards.
- Freda Porter, applied mathematician and environmental scientist known as one of the first Native American women to earn a PhD in the mathematical sciences
- Martha Redbone, singer
- Kelvin Sampson, collegiate and professional basketball coach, currently the Head Coach of the Houston Cougars.
- Helen Maynor Scheirbeck, appointed by Congress to the National Museum of the American Indian (NMAI) Board of Directors, and served as NMAI's Assistant Director of Public Programs.
- Ruth Dial Woods, educator, community worker and activist.

== See also ==
- List of Native Americans of the United States
