= Poet Laureate of Wisconsin =

- Incumbent; Dasha Kelly Hamilton since 2021
- Type: Poet laureate
- Formation: 2001
- First holder: Ellen Kort

The poet laureate of Wisconsin is the poet laureate for the U.S. state of Wisconsin. The position and nominating commission was created by executive order from Governor Tommy Thompson on July 31, 2000. On February 4, 2011, Governor Scott Walker discontinued state sponsorship and sent a letter to the members of the Wisconsin Poet Laureate Commission to inform them it has been terminated. The Wisconsin Academy of Sciences, Arts & Letters assumed the role of the commission May of that year.

== List of poets laureate ==
- Ellen Kort (2001–2004)
- Denise Sweet (2005–2008)
- Marilyn Taylor (2009–2010)
- Bruce Dethlefsen (2011–2012)
- Max Garland (2013–2014)
- Kimberly Blaeser (2015–2016)
- Karla Huston (2017–2018)
- Margaret Rozga (2019–2020)
- Dasha Kelly Hamilton (2021–2022)
- Nicholas Gulig (2023–2024)
- Brenda Cádenas (2025–present)

== See also ==
- Poet laureate
- List of U.S. state poets laureate
- United States Poet Laureate
