= Rancourt =

Rancourt may refer to the following places in France:

- Rancourt, Somme, a commune in the Somme department
- Rancourt, Vosges, a commune in the Vosges department

== See also ==
- Rancourt (surname)
