= Wisconsin Academy of Sciences, Arts & Letters =

Wisconsin nonprofit organization

The Wisconsin Academy of Sciences, Arts & Letters is an independent nonprofit organization based in Madison, Wisconsin, that produces programs and publications related to science, arts, and letters in the state.

Founded in 1870, the academy supports public engagement with scientific, cultural, and civic issues in Wisconsin through publications, exhibitions, lectures, and awards programs.

== History ==
The Wisconsin Academy of Sciences, Arts & Letters was established in 1870 to encourage collaboration and exchange among individuals engaged in scientific, artistic, and scholarly work in Wisconsin. The first annual meeting was held at the state capital on April 14, 1871.

== Programs and publications ==
The organization operates the James Watrous Gallery at the Overture Center for the Arts in Madison, which exhibits contemporary art by Wisconsin artists.

The academy also organizes public lectures and forums across Wisconsin and administers annual literary and leadership awards, including Fiction & Poetry Awards and Fellows Awards. It supports the Wisconsin Poet Laureate program.

=== Wisconsin People and Ideas ===
Fall 2025 Cover of Wisconsin People and Ideas

Wisconsin People and Ideas is a quarterly magazine published by the society. The publication was founded in 1954 under the title Wisconsin Academy Review and was renamed Wisconsin People and Ideas in 2006.

== Affiliations ==
The Wisconsin Academy of Sciences, Arts & Letters is a member of the National Academy of Sciences and the American Association for the Advancement of Science.
