= Dethlefsen =

Dethlefsen is a surname. Notable people with the surname include:

- Bruce Dethlefsen (born 1948), American poet and teacher of poetry
- Carsten Dethlefsen (born 1969), Danish footballer
- Merlyn Hans Dethlefsen (1934–1987), United States Air Force officer
