= Rancourt (surname) =

Rancourt is a surname. Notable people with the surname include:

- Marc Rancourt (born 1984), Canadian ice hockey player
- Nicole Rancourt, Canadian politician
- Rene Rancourt (born 1939), American singer
- Suzanne Rancourt (born 1959), Native American poet and veteran
