= Geary Hobson =

Native American writer (born 1941)

- Born: June 12, 1941 (age 85)
- Education: University of New Mexico
- Writing career
- Notable works: The Last of the Ofos, Deer Hunting" and Other Poems
- Notable awards: Lifetime Achievement Award from the Native Writers' Circle of the Americas (2003), First Book Award from the Native Writers' Circle of the Americas (2002)

Geary Hobson (born 1941) is a Cherokee, Quapaw/Chickasaw scholar, editor and writer of fiction and poetry. Hobson, is faculty emeritus at the University of Oklahoma. He received a lifetime achievement award from the Native Writers' Circle of the Americas in 2003.

In his scholarly work, Hobson has compiled American Indian Literature and critiqued the "appropriation and misuse of Indian culture." In his influential essay "The Rise of the White Shaman as a New Version of Cultural Imperialism" (1976), Hobson noted that neo-romantic works by Jeorome Rothenburg, Gary Snyder, and Gene Fowler "prevented others from understanding the works by writers with authentic tribal experiences." Hobson also suggested that the use of traditional language by Snyder and Fowler is a form of "naked cultural imperialism."

== Bibliography ==
=== Essays ===
- "The Rise of the White Shaman as A New Version of Cultural Imperialism" (1976)

=== Books ===
- Editor, The Remembered Earth: An Anthology of Contemporary Native American Literature (1979)
- The Last of the Ofos (2000)
- Plain of Jars and Other Stories (2011)

=== Poetry ===
- Deer Hunting and Other Poems (1990)
