= Janet McAdams =

American poet

Janet McAdams (born 1957) is an American poet, who wrote The Island of Lost Luggage (University of Arizona Press) which received an American Book Award in 2001 and the First Book Award for Poetry from the Native Writers' Circle of the Americas in 1999. She is also the editor of Salt Publishing's Earthworks Series of Native poets. In addition, she's worked as a telephone operator, a cartographer, a camp counselor, a maid, a cook, and an exercise instructor for people with developmental disabilities.

== Background and education ==
Janet McAdams claims to be of Alabama Creek, Scottish, and Irish ancestry. She received her MFA in creative writing from the University of Alabama and her PhD in comparative literature from Emory University, where her studies focused on American Indian poetry. She has taught literature and creative writing at the University of Alabama, the American School of El Salvador, the University of Oklahoma, and is presently the Robert P. Hubbard Professor of Poetry at Kenyon College.

== Writing career ==
Her first novel, Red Weather, is about a Native American's trip to a small Central American country in search of her activist parents.

== Works ==
- The Island of Lost Luggage, University of Arizona Press. 2000. ISBN 9780816520565
- Feral, Salt Publishing. 2007 ISBN 9781844712953
- Red Weather, (University of Arizona Press, 2012 ISBN 9780816520350

== See also ==
- Poetry
