= Jarrod Lowery =

American politician

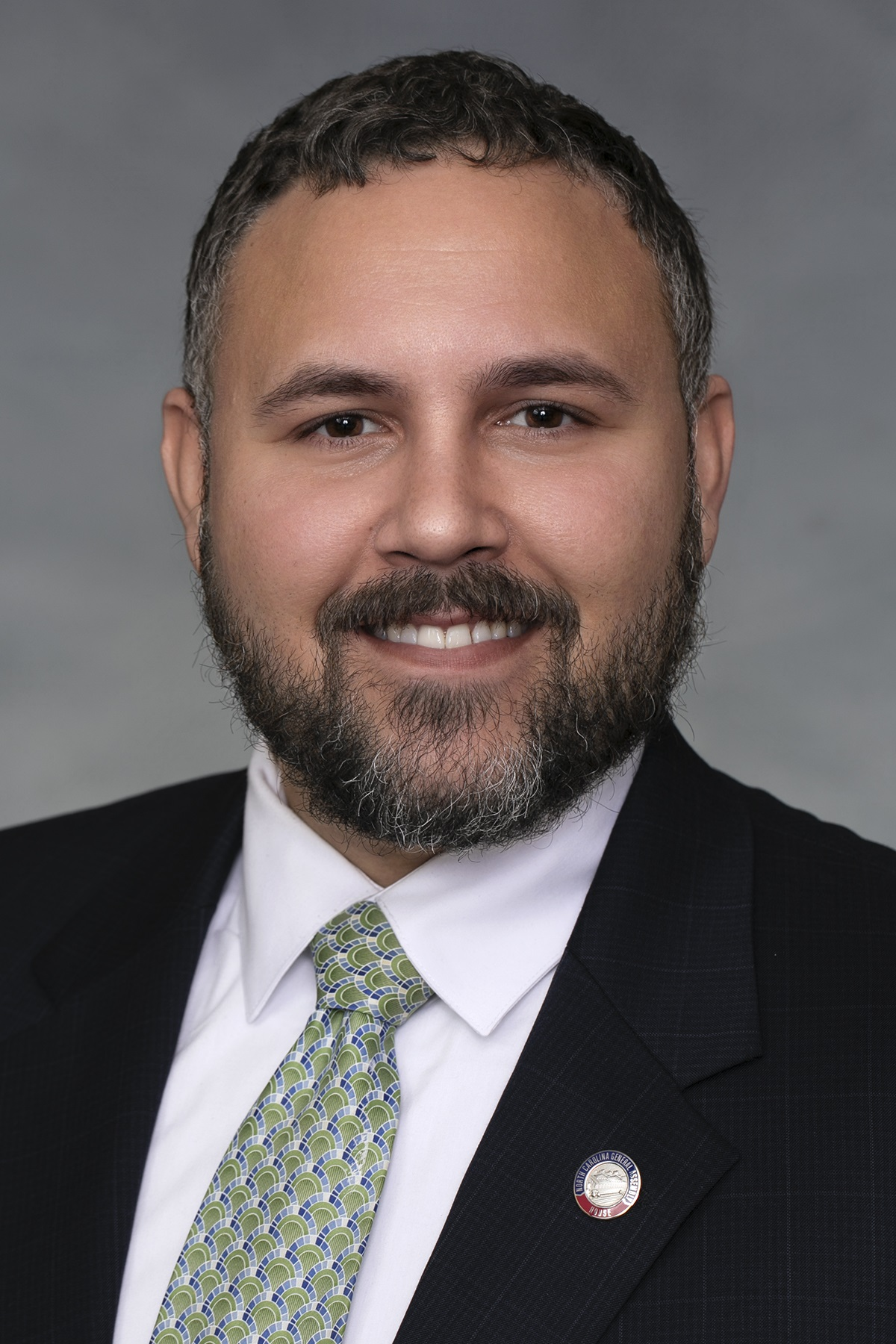

Member of the North Carolina House of Representatives from the 47th district
- In office January 1, 2023 – October 7, 2025
- Preceded by: Charles Graham
- Succeeded by: John Lowery

Personal details
- Born: October 1988 (age 37) Robeson County, North Carolina, U.S.
- Party: Republican
- Children: 1
- Relatives: John Lowery (brother)
- Education: University of North Carolina at Pembroke (BS)

Military service
- Allegiance: United States
- Branch/service: United States Marine Corps

Jarrod Marshall Lowery (born October 7, 1988) is an American politician who served as a Republican member of the North Carolina House of Representatives from the 47th district.

== Education ==
Lowery graduated from Purnell Swett High School and from the University of North Carolina at Pembroke with a bachelor's degree in political science and history.

== Career ==
=== Military ===
He served six years in the United States Marine Corps as a tank technician.

=== Politics ===
He is a member of the Lumbee Tribe of North Carolina. From 2015 to 2021, he served as a member of the Lumbee Tribal Council, representing the communities of Oxendine, Prospect and Wakulla. He also served as chairman of the Tribal Council's Economic Development committee. He was a part of Governor Pat McCrory's senior staff, as a Regional Outreach Liaison. In 2017, he became Regional Director for North Carolina Insurance Commissioner Mike Causey.

Lowery was elected to the seat in the 2022 election against Democratic opponent Charles Townsend He resigned in October 2025 after being appointed to a position in the Trump administration. His brother John Lowery was appointed to succeed him.

Lowery led the Pledge of Allegiance at the 2024 Republican National Convention.

==== Committees ====
While in the North Carolina House he served on 5 committees: Agriculture, Families, Children, and Aging Policy, Finance, and Redistricting. He was the vice-chairman on the committee for Federal Relations and Indian Affairs.

== Personal life ==
Lowery is a member of Galilee Baptist Church in Red Springs and serves as a Sunday school teacher.

He is married to Jennifer Lowery and has two stepchildren and one daughter.

North Carolina House of Representatives
Preceded by Charles Graham	Member of the North Carolina House of Representatives from the 47th district 2023–2025	Succeeded by John Lowery
