= Freda Porter =

Native American applied mathematician and environmental consultant

- Born: October 14, 1957 (age 69); Lumberton, NC
- Other name: Freda Porter-Locklear
- Education: Pembroke State University (BS, 1978) North Carolina State University (MS, 1981) Duke University (PhD, 1991)
- Scientific career
- Workplaces: Porter Scientific, Inc. Lumbee Tribe Enterprises, LLC
- Thesis: A numerical study of propagation of singularities for semilinear hyperbolic systems
- Doctoral advisor: Michael Reed

Freda Porter (born 1957), a member of the Lumbee Tribe of North Carolina, is an applied mathematician and environmental scientist known as one of the first Native American women to earn a PhD in the mathematical sciences. She is the president and CEO of Porter Scientific, Inc. She is the former president of Lumbee Tribe Enterprises, LLC where her contract wasn't renewed after poor performance in 2022.

== Early life and education ==
Freda Porter, a member of the Lumbee tribe, was born on October 14, 1957, in Lumberton, North Carolina. She holds a BS in applied mathematics with a minor in computer science from Pembroke State University, and a MS in applied mathematics with a minor in computer science from North Carolina State University. In 1991, she earned a PhD in applied mathematics, specializing in numerical modeling, from Duke University.

== Career ==
Porter began her career as an assistant professor of mathematics at Pembroke State University from 1991 to 1994. She then completed a postdoctoral fellowship at University of North Carolina, Chapel Hill. Her postdoctoral research focused on modeling groundwater contamination in collaboration with the EPA, and noise modeling and simulation research in collaboration with the NASA Langley Research Center. In 1997, she founded Porter Scientific, Inc., an environmental consulting agency, where she currently serves as the president and CEO. Porter is also known for her involvement with Lumbee tribal government. In 2017, she was elected by the Lumbee Tribal Council to serve as full-time administrator for the Lumbee Tribe of North Carolina. She held this position until 2020, when she was appointed interim president of Lumbee Tribe Enterprises, LLC, a government and industry contracting company owned by the Lumbee Tribe of North Carolina.

Porter has served as an advocate for Native Americans in STEM throughout her career. She founded the Pembroke State chapter of the American Indian Science and Engineering Society (AISES) in 1991 and directed a science and mathematics summer program for Native American high schoolers for three years. She has also served as a member of the Mathematical Association of America's Committee of Minority Participation in Mathematics from 1994 to 1999, and a trustee for the Smithsonian National Museum of the American Indian from 2006 to 2013.
