= Native Writers' Circle of the Americas =

The Native Writers' Circle of the Americas (NWCA) is an organization of writers who identify as being Native American, First Nations, or of Native American ancestry.

The organization presents literary awards annually to writers in three categories:

- First Book of Poetry
- First Book of Prose
- Lifetime Achievement.

The awards are voted upon by member writers.

The Circle (along with its sister organization, the Wordcraft Circle of Native Writers and Storytellers) was formed as the outgrowth of the 1992 "Returning the Gift" Native Writers' Festival, a gathering of writers from Canada, the United States, Mexico and the Central America. The NWCA maintains contact information for Native American writers and a collection of Native American literature. The organization has been hosted by the University of Oklahoma's department of Native American Studies and is currently housed in the Department of English.

== Lifetime Achievement Awards ==
The Native Writers' Circle of the Americas awarded the following Native authors with Lifetime Achievement Awards:

- 1992: N. Scott Momaday (Kiowa)
- 1993: Simon J. Ortiz (Acoma Pueblo)
- 1994: Leslie Marmon Silko (Laguna Pueblo descent)
- 1995: Joy Harjo (Muscogee)
- 1996: Vine Deloria, Jr. (Standing Rock Sioux)
- 1997: James Welch (Blackfeet/Gros Ventre)
- 1998: Linda Hogan (Chickasaw)
- 1999: Joseph Bruchac (Nulhegan Band of the Coosuk Abenaki Nation)
- 2000: Louise Erdrich (Turtle Mountain Ojibwe)
- 2001: Paula Gunn Allen (Laguna Pueblo descent) and Gerald Vizenor (White Earth Chippewa)
- 2002: Maurice Kenny (self-identified Mohawk/Seneca ancestry)
- 2003: Geary Hobson (Cherokee Nation/Quapaw/Chickasaw)
- 2004: Lee Francis (Laguna Pueblo descent)
- 2005: Carter Revard (Osage Nation)
- 2006: Luci Tapahonso (Navajo)
- 2007: Elizabeth Cook-Lynn (Crow Creek Sioux)
- 2008: Robert J. Conley (Cherokee Nation)
- 2009: Jack D. Forbes (self-identified Powhatan Renape/Lenape descent)
- 2010: Sherman Alexie (Spokane/Coeur D'Alene)
- 2011: Wilma Mankiller (Cherokee Nation)
- 2012: LeAnne Howe (Choctaw Nation)
- 2013: Donald L. Birchfield (Choctaw Nation/Chickasaw)
- 2014: Diane Glancy (self-identified Cherokee descent)
- 2015: Allison Adelle Hedge Coke (self-identified Metis/Huron/Cherokee descent)
- 2016: John Trudell (Santee Dakota) and Jim Northrup (Fond du Lac Ojibwe)
- 2017: Duane Niatum (Klallam)
- 2018: William S. Yellow Robe Jr. (Assiniboine and Sioux Tribes of the Fort Peck Indian Reservation)
- 2019: Maria Campbell (Métis)

== First Book Awards for Prose ==
- 1992: Robert L. Perea (Oglala Lakota), Stacey's Story
  - Melissa Tantaquidgeon Zobel (Mohegan), The Lasting of the Mohegans
  - William S. Yellow Robe, Jr. (Assiniboine), The Star Quilter (play, published in Where the Pavement Ends)
- 1993: Philip H. Red Eagle (Sioux-Klallam), Red Earth
- 1994: Gus Palmer, Jr. (Kiowa), Calling Through the Creek
- 1995: Glenn J. Twist (Cherokee Nation/Muscogee), Boston Mountain Tales
- 1996: No award.
- 1997: Robert J. Perry (Chickasaw), Life With the Little People
  - D. L. Birchfield (Choctaw Nation/Chickasaw), The Oklahoma Basic Intelligence Test
- 1998: No award.
- 1999: Evelina Zuni Lucero (Isleta Pueblo/Ohkay Owingeh), Night Sky, Morning Star
- 2000: Chip Livingston (self-identified Poarch Creek), Naming Ceremony
- 2001: Valerie Red-Horse (self-identified Cherokee descent), Naturally Native
- 2002: Edythe S. Hobson (Arkansas Quapaw), An Inquest Every Sunday
- 2003: Susan Supernaw (Muscogee Creek/Munsee), The Power of a Name
- 2004: Kimberly G. Roppolo (self-identified Southeastern American Indian ancestry), Back to the Blanket: Reading, Writing, and Resistance for American Indian Literary Critics
- 2005: Mia Heavener (Central Yup'ik), Tundra Berries
- 2006: Judy R. Smith (self-identified Quinnipiac/Mohican), Yellowbird
  - Frederick White (Haida), Welcome to the City of Rainbows
- 2007: Mary Lockwood (Malemuit Iñupiaq), Attugu Summa/Come and See What It Is
- 2008: Linda LeGarde Grover (Chippewa, Bois Forte Band of Minnesota), "The Road Back to Sweetgrass"
- 2009: JudyLee Oliva (Chickasaw), Te Ata and Other Plays
- 2018: no award given

== First Book Awards for Poetry ==
- 1992: Gloria Bird (Spokane), Full Moon on the Reservation
  - Joe Dale Tate Nevaquaya (Yuchi/Comanche), Leaving Holes
- 1993: Kimberly Blaeser (White Earth Chippewa), Trailing You
- 1994: Tiffany Midge (Standing Rock Sioux), Outlaws, Renegades and Saints
- 1995: Denise Sweet (White Earth Chippewa), Songs for Discharming
- 1996: Charles G. Ballard (Quapaw/Cherokee), Winter Count Poems
- 1997: Deborah A. Miranda (Costanoan/Esselen/Ohlone), Indian Cartography
- 1998: Jennifer K. Greene (Salish-Kootenai/Chippewa/Cree), What I Keep
- 1999: Janet McAdams (self-identified Alabama Creek descent), The Island of Lost Luggage
- 2000: Karenne Wood (Monacan), Markings on Earth
- 2001: Suzanne Rancourt (self-identified Abenaki/Huron descent), Billboard in the Clouds
- 2002: Renee Matthew (Koyukon), Down River From Here
  - Phillip Caroll Morgan (Choctaw/Chickasaw), The Fork-in-the-Road Indian Poetry Store
- 2003: Marlon D. Sherman (Oglala Lakota), Wild Plums
- 2004: Christina M. Castro (Jemez Pueblo/Taos Pueblo), Silence on the Rez
  - Cathy Ruiz (Cree/Métis), Stirring up the Water
- 2005: Kim Shuck (Cherokee Nation), Smuggling Cherokee
- 2006: Rebecca Hatcher Travis (Chickasaw), Picked Apart the Bones
- 2007: Kade L. Twist (Cherokee Nation), Amazing Grace
- 2008: Steve Russell (Cherokee Nation), Wicked Dew
- 2009: Rain Prud’homme-Cranford (Rain C. Goméz) (Louisiana Creole), Smoked Mullet Cornbread Crawdad Memory
- 2018: Yulu Elwis (Kristen Debler) (Coast Miwok/Federated Indians of Graton Rancheria), Opé

== See also ==
- List of writers from peoples indigenous to the Americas
- List of 20th-century writers
