= Tiffany Midge =

American poet

- Born: July 2, 1965 (age 61)
- Citizenship: American
- Education: University of Idaho
- Occupations: Poet; Author; Educator
- Writing career
- Language: English
- Years active: 1995–present
- Website: tiffanymidge.wixsite.com/website

Tiffany Midge (born July 2, 1965) is a Native American poet, editor, and author, who is a Hunkpapa Lakota enrolled member of the Standing Rock Sioux.

== Early life and education ==
Midge was born to mother Alita Rose and father Herman Lloyd. Midge's mother worked as a civil servant for King County and her father was a teacher. Midge's mother was Lakota Sioux and grew up on a reservation in eastern Montana. Midge's father was raised on a farm in Montana. His family was from Germany, but were originally from Russia near the Valga River.

Midge grew up in the Pacific Northwest. For part of her childhood she lived in Snoqualmie Valley in Washington (state). She has an older half-sister named Julie.

In 2008, Midge received an MFA in creative writing from the University of Idaho.

== Career ==
Midge's poetry is noted for its depiction of a self divided by differing identities, and for a strong streak of humor.

In 2002, Finnish composer Seppo Pohjola commissioned Midge's work into a performance called Cedars for a choral ensemble that was produced at Red Eagle Soaring Native Youth Theater in Seattle. In 2015, Cedars was produced by the Mirage Theatre Company at La MaMa in New York City. The work is a mixture of poetry and prose set to music. The newer version incorporates work by many Native American writers who in addition to Midge include Alex Jacobs, Arthur Tulee, Deborah A. Miranda, Evan Pritchard, Gail Tremblay, Joseph Bruchac, Martha Brice, Molly McGlennen, and William Michael Paul.

Midge was a humor columnist for Indian Country Media Network's Indian Country Today.

In 2019, Midge published a memoir called Bury My Heart at Chuck E. Cheese's from University of Nebraska Press. Cleveland Review of Books said the novel's "embrace of grief allows for an expansive range of humor that includes satire, dry wit, Twitter, and inside jokes not here for white consumption."

Midge's poetry, fiction, and creative nonfiction has appeared in McSweeney's, The Toast Butter Blog, Waxwing, Moss, Okey-Pankey, Mud City, Apex, The Rumpus, Yellow Medicine Review, The Raven Chronicles, North American Review and World Literature Today, and has been widely anthologized.

=== Teaching ===
Midge was a professor at Northwest Indian College, where she taught writing and composition.

In Spring 2019, she was the Simons Public Humanities fellow for University of Kansas Hall Center for the Humanities.

== Honors and awards ==
- 2017: National Cowboy and Western Heritage Museum, Western Heritage Award for Poetry Book for The Woman Who Married A Bear
- 2015–18: Moscow, Idaho Poet Laureate
- 2017: Kenyon Review Earthworks Prize for Indigenous Poetry for The Woman Who Married A Bear
- 1994: Native Writers' Circle of the Americas, Diane Decorah Poetry Award/First Book Awards for Poetry for Outlaws, Renegades and Saints: Diary of a Mixed-Up Halfbreed

== Personal life ==
Midge lives in Moscow, Idaho, which she refers to as Nez Perce country, as well as Seattle, Washington.

== Selected works and publications ==
=== Books ===
- Midge, Tiffany (retold by); Warren, Vic (additional text & book design by); Magnuson, Diana (illustrations by) (1995). Animal Lore & Legend--Buffalo: American Indian Legends. New York: Scholastic. ISBN 978-0-590-22489-5. OCLC 160081734.
- Midge, Tiffany (1996). Outlaws, Renegades and Saints: Diary of a Mixed-Up Halfbreed. Greenfield Center, NY: Greenfield Review Press. ISBN 978-0-912-67893-1. OCLC 35233419.
- Midge, Tiffany (Summer 2001). "Sweetheart". Phati'tude. 1 (2 (Indian Summer)). The Intercultural Alliance of Artists & Scholars, Inc.: 62. ISBN 978-1-453-71992-3.
- Midge, Tiffany (2005). Guiding the Stars to Their Campfire, Driving the Salmon to Their Beds: Poems. Everett, WA: Gazoobi Tales. ISBN 978-0-967-93644-4. OCLC 64202269.
- Midge, Tiffany (April 2008). The Fertility Circus (Thesis/dissertation). Moscow, ID: University of Idaho. OCLC 311595612.
- Midge, Tiffany (2016). The Woman Who Married a Bear: Poems. Albuquerque: University of New Mexico Press. ISBN 978-0-826-35652-9. OCLC 911920673.
- Midge, Tiffany (2019). Bury My Heart at Chuck E. Cheese's. Lincoln, NE: University of Nebraska Press. ISBN 978-1-496-21803-2. OCLC 1112608655.
- Midge, Tiffany (2019). HORNS. Spokane, WA: Scablands Books. – forthcoming

=== Anthologies ===
- Midge, Tiffany (1996). "Beets". In Trafzer, Clifford E. (ed.). Blue Dawn, Red Earth: New Native American Storytellers. New York: Anchor Books. pp. 267–278. ISBN 978-0-385-47952-3. OCLC 32893633.
- Midge, Tiffany (1997). "Written in blood (Lakota)". In Harjo, Joy; Bird, Gloria (eds.). Reinventing the Enemy's Language: Contemporary Native Women's Writing of North America. New York: W.W. Norton & Co. p. 212. ISBN 978-0-393-31828-9. OCLC 40309378.
- Midge, Tiffany (Summer 1997). "Fishing at Sandy Point". Studies in American Indian Literatures. 9 (2). University of Nebraska Press: 57–58. ISSN 0730-3238. JSTOR 20739397. OCLC 5542768723.
- Midge, Tiffany (1998). "A Half-Breed's Dream Vacation". In Gillan, Maria M.; Gillan, Jennifer (eds.). Growing Up Ethnic in America: Contemporary Fiction About Learning to Be American. New York: Viking. pp. 68–75. ISBN 978-1-101-64020-3. OCLC 607386833.
- Midge, Tiffany (1998). Bender, Sheila; Tobin, Philip (eds.). "The Seattle Sister Cities Poetry Anthologies". The Poem & the World: An International Anthology. 4. Seattle, WA: The Poem & the World. ISBN 978-0-963-61247-2. OCLC 49421582.
- Paul-Martin, Michael; Belmore, Florene, eds. (1998). A Shade of Spring: An Anthology of Native Writers. Toronto: 7th Generation Books. ISBN 978-1-896-92304-8. OCLC 976545620.
- Midge, Tiffany (2003). "The Woman Who Married a Bear; Sweetheart; Baskets; First Snow of '96; Promises of Winter; The Night Horse; Chateau Ste. Michelle's". In Akiwenzie-Damm, Kateri (ed.). Without Reservation: Indigenous Erotica. Wiarton, Ont.: Kegedonce Press. pp. 37, 43, 66–69, 165. ISBN 978-1-877-28397-0. OCLC 51838032.
- Midge, Tiffany (November–December 2005). "Portrait of a Backwoods Wife with an Axe to Grind". The North American Review. 290 (6). University of Northern Iowa: 19. ISSN 0029-2397. JSTOR 25127468. OCLC 99695727.
- Midge, Tiffany (November–December 2009). "A Postcolonial Irony". The North American Review. 294 (6). University of Northern Iowa: 24. ISSN 0029-2397. JSTOR 40792604. OCLC 649200138.
- Midge, Tiffany (Fall 2010). "(Dis)Beliefs Suspended". The North American Review. 295 (4). University of Northern Iowa: 24. ISSN 0029-2397. JSTOR 23055035. OCLC 5543819552.
- Midge, Tiffany (Fall 2015). "Ranches with Wolves". The North American Review. 300 (4). University of Northern Iowa: 6. ISSN 0029-2397. JSTOR 44601147. OCLC 7973268464.
- Midge, Tiffany (2018). "Horns". In Shields, Sharma (ed.). Lilac City Fairy Tales, v. 4: Towers & Dungeons. Spokane, WA: Scablands Books. ISBN 978-0-990-75257-8. OCLC 1033619956.

=== Other work ===
- Midge, Tiffany (Winter 1999). Hogan, Linda (ed.). "Review of Indian Cartography by Deborah A. Miranda". Studies in American Indian Literatures. 11 (4). University of Nebraska Press: 83–86. ISSN 0730-3238. JSTOR 20736940. OCLC 5542781995.
- Midge, Tiffany (19 March 2018). "Apocalypse Powwow: The Elusive Search for Sherman Alexie". The Offing.
- Midge, Tiffany (6 June 2018). "Open Letters: An Open Letter to White Women Concerning The Handmaid's Tale and America's Cultural Amnesia". McSweeney's.
