= Charles Graham (American politician) =

American politician

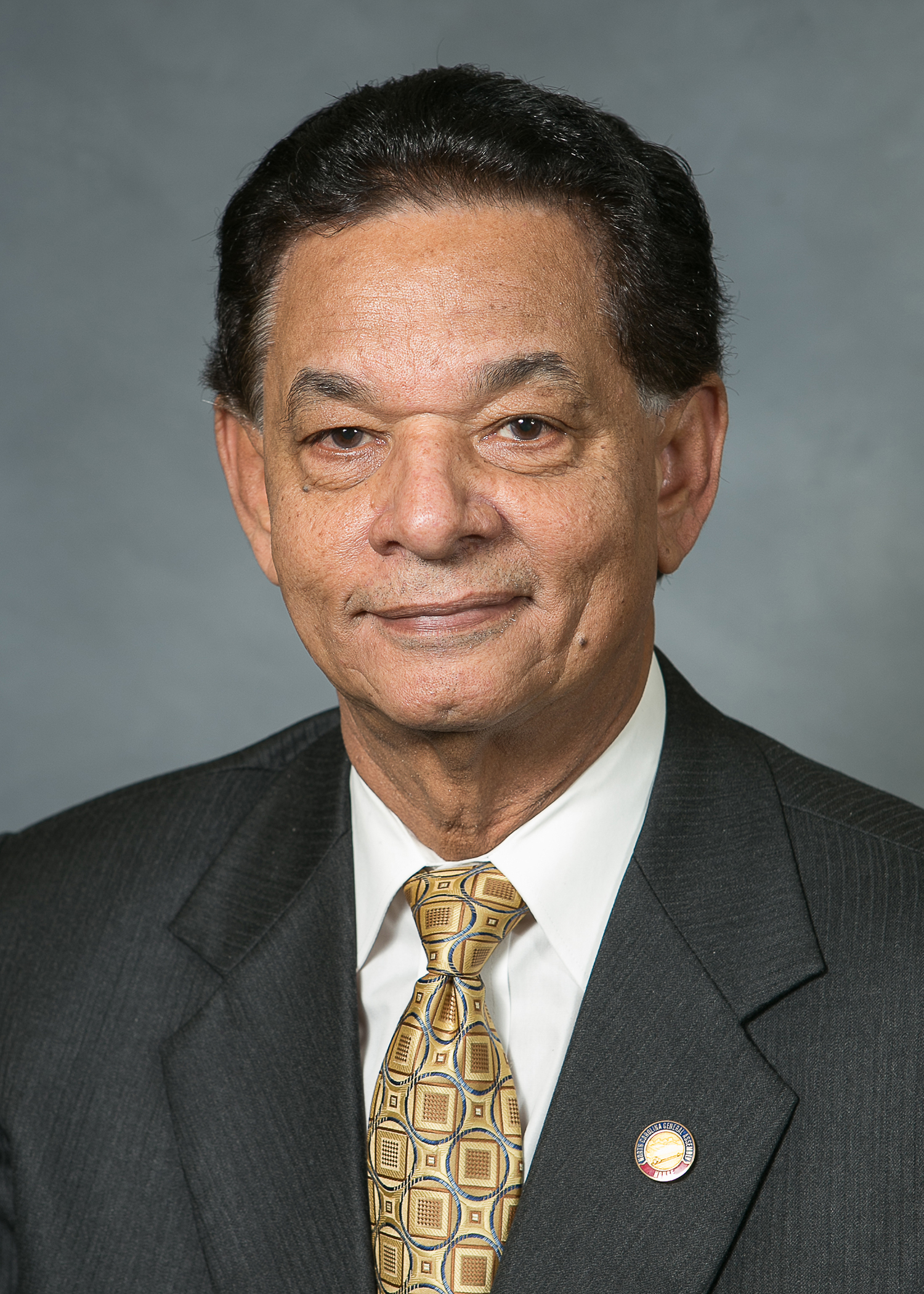

Member of the North Carolina House of Representatives from the 47th district
- In office January 1, 2011 – January 1, 2023
- Preceded by: Ronnie Sutton
- Succeeded by: Jarrod Lowery

Personal details
- Born: Charles Vinson Graham Jr. February 26, 1951 (age 75) Pembroke, North Carolina, U.S.
- Party: Democratic
- Education: University of North Carolina, Pembroke (BS); Appalachian State University (MEd); Lehigh University (EdS)

Charles Vinson Graham Jr. (born February 26, 1951) is an American politician who served as a member of the North Carolina House of Representatives from the 47th district. Graham, a member of the Lumbee Tribe of North Carolina, was the only Native American who was serving in the General Assembly until the election of his successor Jarrod Lowery.

== Career ==
Graham is a former member of the Election Law Committee in the North Carolina State House of Representatives, and of the Subcommittee on Business and Labor in the North Carolina State House of Representatives. He also now serves on seven legislative committees: he is Vice Chair of the Agriculture committee, he serves on the Appropriations committee, he serves as the vice chair of the committee for Commerce and Job Development, he is a member of the insurance committee, he serves in the Subcommittee on Appropriations, Justice and Public Safety, he serves in the Subcommittee on Education, K-12, and also in the Transportation committee.

During the 2016 legislative session, Graham was one of 11 Democrats to vote in favor of the House Bill 2, the controversial "Bathroom Bill." In October 2021, Graham issued an apology for voting in favor of the bill.

=== 2022 congressional campaign ===
On October 5, 2021, Graham announced he was running for Congress in North Carolina's 9th congressional district. His campaign video went viral on Twitter, where it received over 5 million views.

Following redistricting, however, Graham switched to the 7th congressional district.

== Electoral history ==
=== 2022 ===
United States House of Representatives North Carolina's 7th congressional district Democratic primary election, 2022
Party	Candidate	Votes	%
Democratic	Charles Graham	13,054	31.23%
Democratic	Charles E. Evans	12,263	29.34%
Democratic	Steve Miller	9,744	23.31%
Democratic	Yushonda Midgette	6,738	16.12%
Total votes		41,799	100%

United States House of Representatives North Carolina's 7th congressional district general election, 2022
Party	Candidate	Votes	%
Republican	David Rouzer (incumbent)	164,047	57.71
Democratic	Charles Graham	120,222	42.29
Total votes		284,269	100.00
Republican hold			

=== 2020 ===
North Carolina House of Representatives 47th district general election, 2020
Party	Candidate	Votes	%
Democratic	Charles Graham (incumbent)	14,470	52.44%
Republican	Olivia Oxedine	13,126	47.56%
Total votes		27,596	100%
Democratic hold			

=== 2018 ===
North Carolina House of Representatives 47th district general election, 2018
Party	Candidate	Votes	%
Democratic	Charles Graham (incumbent)	11,496	58.91%
Republican	Jarrod Lowery	8,018	41.09%
Total votes		19,514	100%
Democratic hold			

=== 2016 ===
North Carolina House of Representatives 47th district Democratic primary election, 2016
Party	Candidate	Votes	%
Democratic	Charles Graham (incumbent)	5,634	58.39%
Democratic	Randall Jones	4,015	41.61%
Total votes		9,649	100%

North Carolina House of Representatives 47th district general election, 2016
Party	Candidate	Votes	%
Democratic	Charles Graham (incumbent)	17,366	100%
Total votes		17,366	100%
Democratic hold			

=== 2014 ===
North Carolina House of Representatives 47th district general election, 2014
Party	Candidate	Votes	%
Democratic	Charles Graham (incumbent)	9,978	100%
Total votes		9,978	100%
Democratic hold			

=== 2012 ===
North Carolina House of Representatives 47th district general election, 2012
Party	Candidate	Votes	%
Democratic	Charles Graham (incumbent)	18,322	100%
Total votes		18,322	100%
Democratic hold			

=== 2010 ===
North Carolina House of Representatives 47th district Democratic primary election, 2010
Party	Candidate	Votes	%
Democratic	Charles Graham	4,544	51.04%
Democratic	Ronnie Sutton (incumbent)	4,358	48.96%
Total votes		8,902	100%

North Carolina House of Representatives 47th district general election, 2010
Party	Candidate	Votes	%
Democratic	Charles Graham	7,865	66.83%
Republican	Brawleigh Jason Graham	3,903	33.17%
Total votes		11,768	100%
Democratic hold			

=== 2008 ===
North Carolina House of Representatives 47th district Democratic primary election, 2008
Party	Candidate	Votes	%
Democratic	Ronnie Sutton (incumbent)	6,932	59.53%
Democratic	Charles Graham	4,713	40.47%
Total votes		11,645	100%

North Carolina House of Representatives
Preceded by Ronnie Sutton	Member of the North Carolina House of Representatives from the 47th district 2011–2023	Succeeded by Jarrod Lowery
