= Karla Huston =

American poet

Karla Huston is an American poet in Appleton, Wisconsin. She was the Poet Laureate of Wisconsin, serving a two-year term from 2017 to 2018.

Huston is the author of eleven chapbooks of poems, the latest Grief Bone, (Five Oaks Press), and a full collection A Theory of Lipstick (Main Street Rag Publications), Huston's work has garnered many awards, including a Pushcart Prize for the poem "Theory of Lipstick." She received an Outstanding Achievement Award from the Wisconsin Library Association for her collection of the same title. Her writing has earned residencies at Ragdale Foundation as well as the Bread Loaf Writers’ Conference. Her chapbook, Flight Patterns won the Main Street Rag Chapbook Contest in 2003. Huston has also been awarded three Jade Rings (one for fiction, two for poetry) from Wisconsin Writers Association (WWA).

== Life and education ==
Huston was born February 11, 1949, in La Crosse, Wisconsin, raised in West Salem, Wisconsin. She attended the University of Wisconsin Oshkosh where she received her Bachelor of Science degree in (English) education in 1993.

Huston earned her Master of Arts/ Creative Writing from the University of Wisconsin Oshkosh in 2003. She taught creative writing and literature at Neenah High School, Neenah, Wisconsin, from 1994 to 2009.

== Books ==
- A Halo of Watchful Eyes (Wolf Angel Press (defunct), 1997)
- Pencil Test (Cassandra Press (defunct), 2002)
- Flight Patterns (Main Street Rag Publications, 2003)
- Virgins on the Rocks (Parallel Press, 2004)
- Catch and Release (Marsh River Editions, 2005)
- An Inventory of Lost Things (Centennial Press, 2009)
- Split Personality Karla Huston and Cathryn Cofell (Sunny Outside, 2012)
- A Theory of Lipstick (Main Street Rag Publications, 2013)
- Outside of a Dog (Dancing Girl Press, 2013)
- Grief Bone (Five Oaks Press, 2017)

== Anthologies ==
- Between the Sheets Karla Huston, Cathryn Cofell, Bruce Dethlefsen, Annette Grunseth, Michael Koehler, Carrie Rellis, and Peter Sherrill (Perma Press (defunct), 2002)

== Awards and prizes ==
- Flight Patterns, winner of the Main Street Rag Chapbook Contest: 2003
- Pushcart, Best of the Small Presses: 2011
- A Theory of Lipstick, Wisconsin Library Association Outstanding Achievement Award
- Wisconsin Writers Association, Jade Ring Award, poetry 2000, 2011, fiction 1998
