= North Carolina's 47th House district =

American legislative district

North Carolina's 47th State House of Representatives district
Representative
John Lowery; R–Lumberton
- Demographics: 18% White; 25% Black; 7% Hispanic; 1% Asian; 46% Native American; 3% Multiracial
- Population (2024): 83,771

North Carolina's 47th House district is one of 120 districts in the North Carolina House of Representatives. It has been represented by Republican John Lowery since October 17, 2025. The seat was previously held by his brother Jarrod Lowery from 2023 to 2025.

== Geography ==
Since 2005, the district has included part of Robeson County. The district overlaps with the 24th Senate district.

== District officeholders ==
Representative	Party	Dates	Notes	Counties
District created January 1, 1983.
Ray Charles Fletcher (Valdese)	Democratic	January 1, 1983 – January 1, 1993		1983–2003; Part of Burke County.
Walt Church (Valdese)	Democratic	January 1, 1993 – January 1, 2003	Redistricted to the 86th district.	1983–2003; Part of Burke County.
Ronnie Sutton (Pembroke)	Democratic	January 1, 2003 – January 1, 2011	Redistricted from the 85th district. Lost re-nomination.	2003–2005; Parts of Hoke and Robeson counties.
Ronnie Sutton (Pembroke)	Democratic	January 1, 2003 – January 1, 2011	Redistricted from the 85th district. Lost re-nomination.	2005–Present; Part of Robeson County.
Charles Graham (Lumberton)	Democratic	January 1, 2011 – January 1, 2023	Retired to run for Congress.	2005–Present; Part of Robeson County.
Jarrod Lowery (Pembroke)	Republican	January 1, 2023 – October 7, 2025	Resigned to accept job in the Trump Administration.	2005–Present; Part of Robeson County.
Vacant		October 7, 2025 – October 17, 2025		2005–Present; Part of Robeson County.
John Lowery (Lumberton)	Republican	October 17, 2025 – Present	Appointed to finish his Brother's term.	2005–Present; Part of Robeson County.

== Election results ==
=== 2024 ===
North Carolina House of Representatives 47th district general election, 2024
Party	Candidate	Votes	%
Republican	Jarrod Lowery (incumbent)	20,428	64.63%
Democratic	Eshonda Hooper	11,182	35.37%
Total votes		31,610	100%
Republican hold			

=== 2022 ===
North Carolina House of Representatives 47th district Democratic primary election, 2022
Party	Candidate	Votes	%
Democratic	Charles Townsend	3,355	63.82%
Democratic	Aminah Ghaffar	1,902	36.18%
Total votes		5,257	100%

North Carolina House of Representatives 47th district Republican primary election, 2022
Party	Candidate	Votes	%
Republican	Jarrod Lowery	1,310	70.05%
Republican	Mickey Biggs	560	29.95%
Total votes		1,870	100%

North Carolina House of Representatives 47th district general election, 2022
Party	Candidate	Votes	%
Republican	Jarrod Lowery	11,386	60.76%
Democratic	Charles Townsend	7,353	39.24%
Total votes		18,739	100%
Republican gain from Democratic			

=== 2020 ===
North Carolina House of Representatives 47th district general election, 2020
Party	Candidate	Votes	%
Democratic	Charles Graham (incumbent)	14,470	52.44%
Republican	Olivia Oxendine	13,126	47.56%
Total votes		27,596	100%
Democratic hold			

=== 2018 ===
North Carolina House of Representatives 47th district Republican primary election, 2018
Party	Candidate	Votes	%
Republican	Jarrod Lowery	572	59.83%
Republican	Tom Norton	384	40.17%
Total votes		956	100%

North Carolina House of Representatives 47th district general election, 2018
Party	Candidate	Votes	%
Democratic	Charles Graham (incumbent)	11,496	58.91%
Republican	Jarrod Lowery	8,018	41.09%
Total votes		19,514	100%
Democratic hold			

=== 2016 ===
North Carolina House of Representatives 47th district Democratic primary election, 2016
Party	Candidate	Votes	%
Democratic	Charles Graham (incumbent)	5,634	58.39%
Democratic	Randall Jones	4,015	41.61%
Total votes		9,649	100%

North Carolina House of Representatives 47th district general election, 2016
Party	Candidate	Votes	%
Democratic	Charles Graham (incumbent)	17,366	100%
Total votes		17,366	100%
Democratic hold			

=== 2014 ===
North Carolina House of Representatives 47th district general election, 2014
Party	Candidate	Votes	%
Democratic	Charles Graham (incumbent)	9,978	100%
Total votes		9,978	100%
Democratic hold			

=== 2012 ===
North Carolina House of Representatives 47th district general election, 2012
Party	Candidate	Votes	%
Democratic	Charles Graham (incumbent)	18,322	100%
Total votes		18,322	100%
Democratic hold			

=== 2010 ===
North Carolina House of Representatives 47th district Democratic primary election, 2010
Party	Candidate	Votes	%
Democratic	Charles Graham	4,544	51.04%
Democratic	Ronnie Sutton (incumbent)	4,358	48.96%
Total votes		8,902	100%

North Carolina House of Representatives 47th district general election, 2010
Party	Candidate	Votes	%
Democratic	Charles Graham	7,865	66.83%
Republican	Brawleigh Jason Graham	3,903	33.17%
Total votes		11,768	100%
Democratic hold			

=== 2008 ===
North Carolina House of Representatives 47th district Democratic primary election, 2008
Party	Candidate	Votes	%
Democratic	Ronnie Sutton (incumbent)	6,932	59.53%
Democratic	Charles Graham	4,713	40.47%
Total votes		11,645	100%

North Carolina House of Representatives 47th district general election, 2008
Party	Candidate	Votes	%
Democratic	Ronnie Sutton (incumbent)	17,238	100%
Total votes		17,238	100%
Democratic hold			

=== 2006 ===
North Carolina House of Representatives 47th district general election, 2006
Party	Candidate	Votes	%
Democratic	Ronnie Sutton (incumbent)	5,791	100%
Total votes		5,791	100%
Democratic hold			

=== 2004 ===
North Carolina House of Representatives 47th district general election, 2004
Party	Candidate	Votes	%
Democratic	Ronnie Sutton (incumbent)	15,224	100%
Total votes		15,224	100%
Democratic hold			

=== 2002 ===
North Carolina House of Representatives 47th district general election, 2002
Party	Candidate	Votes	%
Democratic	Ronnie Sutton (incumbent)	7,031	73.18%
Republican	Christopher Lowry	2,577	26.82%
Total votes		9,608	100%
Democratic hold			

=== 2000 ===
North Carolina House of Representatives 47th district general election, 2000
Party	Candidate	Votes	%
Democratic	Walt Church (incumbent)	12,102	58.55%
Republican	Earl A. Cook	8,567	41.45%
Total votes		20,669	100%
Democratic hold			
