= Ronnie N. Sutton =

American politician

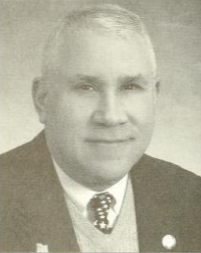
Sutton in the 2003 legislative manual

Ronnie Neal Sutton (born June 17, 1941) is a former Democratic member of the North Carolina General Assembly who represented the state's forty-seventh House district, including constituents in Hoke and Robeson counties. An attorney from Pembroke, North Carolina, Sutton served nine terms in the state house (1993-2011). He is a member of the Lumbee Tribe of North Carolina.

== Recent electoral history ==
=== 2010 ===
North Carolina House of Representatives 47th district Democratic primary election, 2010
Party	Candidate	Votes	%
Democratic	Charles Graham	4,544	51.04%
Democratic	Ronnie Sutton (incumbent)	4,358	48.96%
Total votes		8,902	100%

=== 2008 ===
North Carolina House of Representatives 47th district Democratic primary election, 2008
Party	Candidate	Votes	%
Democratic	Ronnie Sutton (incumbent)	6,932	59.53%
Democratic	Charles Graham	4,713	40.47%
Total votes		11,645	100%

North Carolina House of Representatives 47th district general election, 2008
Party	Candidate	Votes	%
Democratic	Ronnie Sutton (incumbent)	17,238	100%
Total votes		17,238	100%
Democratic hold			

=== 2006 ===
North Carolina House of Representatives 47th district general election, 2006
Party	Candidate	Votes	%
Democratic	Ronnie Sutton (incumbent)	5,791	100%
Total votes		5,791	100%
Democratic hold			

=== 2004 ===
North Carolina House of Representatives 47th district general election, 2004
Party	Candidate	Votes	%
Democratic	Ronnie Sutton (incumbent)	15,224	100%
Total votes		15,224	100%
Democratic hold			

=== 2002 ===
North Carolina House of Representatives 47th district general election, 2002
Party	Candidate	Votes	%
Democratic	Ronnie Sutton (incumbent)	7,031	73.18%
Republican	Christopher Lowry	2,577	26.82%
Total votes		9,608	100%
Democratic hold			

=== 2000 ===
North Carolina House of Representatives 85th district general election, 2000
Party	Candidate	Votes	%
Democratic	Ronnie Sutton (incumbent)	12,927	100%
Total votes		12,927	100%
Democratic hold			

North Carolina House of Representatives
Preceded by Constituency established	Member of the North Carolina House of Representatives from the 85th district 1993-2003	Succeeded by Mitch Gillespie
Preceded by Walt Church	Member of the North Carolina House of Representatives from the 47th district 2003-2011	Succeeded by Charles Graham
