= William "Hawk" Birdshead =

Lakota activist working in the suicide prevention movement

William Hawk Birdshead
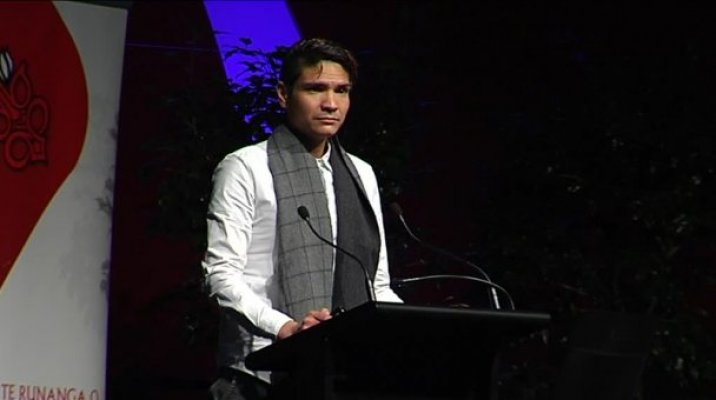
- Born: Pine Ridge, South Dakota U.S.
- Citizenship: Cheyenne and Arapaho Tribes, United States
- Known for: International Environmentalist - International Suicide Prevention - Humanitarian
- Movement: Indigenous Life Movement

William "Hawk" Birdshead (Cheyenne and Arapaho) is an activist who founded Indigenous Life Movement, a media organization. He works in suicide prevention.

== Career ==
At the 2016 Glastonbury Music Festival, he participated as one of the singers in the opening of the festival, and later performed live on the Arcadia Spider Stage with world music performers from Australia, New Zealand and Africa, participating in setting the world record for forming the largest human peace sign. Also in 2016 he toured the United Kingdom as one of the presenters of the film "Awake, A Dream From Standing Rock."

In 2017, Birdshead was a keynote speaker at the inaugural World Indigenous Suicide Prevention Conference in Rotorua, New Zealand.
