= Cecile Black Boy =

Blackfoot Indiana artist and historian

- Noomohtsiistaapitapi Sstaniiniki
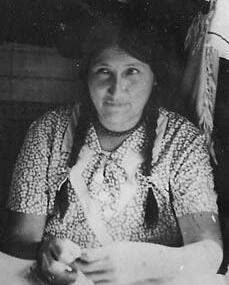
- Cecile Black Boy in 1940.
- Pronunciation: Kills Before pronounced (Is-sah-ni-nik-ki).
- Born: October 10,1895; Browning, Glacier County, Montana, United States
- Died: February 19, 1966 (age 69); Blackfoot Reservation, Browning, Glacier County, Montana, United States.
- Burial place: Blackfoot Reservation, Browning, Glacier County, Montana, United States.
- Other names: Kills Before, Kills Instead, Cecile Short Robe, Cecile Last Star, Cecile Boy, and Noomohtsiistaapitapi Sstaniiniki.
- Occupations: Artist, writer, author, Native American Activist
- Notable work: Published in Painted Tipis By Contemporary Plains Indians and Blackfeet Tipi Legends
- Spouse: Oscar Boy -1938 Reuben Black Boy 1938-1953 Theodore Last Star 1953-1966
- Children: Calvin Boy (son), Margeret Vivian Ledeau (daughter), James Lewis Boy (son), and Joeseph Boy (son).
- Parents: Short Robe (father); Going After Water (mother)
- Relatives: Emma Short Robe (sister), William Short Robe (brother), and Mike Short Robe (brother)

Cecile Black Boy (October 10, 1895 - February 19, 1966) was a Native American member of the Blackfoot Nation in the United States who contributed a large number of myths, information, and stories from her people to expose general knowledge about the Blackfeet peoples. She was a writer, artist, author and Native American Activist. Cecile is also referred to as Kills Before / Kills Instead, Cecile Last Star, Cecile Boy, and Noomohtsiistaapitapi Sstaniiniki in her native Blackfoot language, Siksiká. Cecile was included in several exhibits by the Museum of the Plains Indian to recognize her work she did for her people. Cecile Black Boy created historical records of tribal culture espically regarding tipi legends. She also described as a "Blackfeet ambassador" with great knowledge of Blackfoot histories, language, culture, and ceremony.

She was published through two books: Painted Tipis by Contemporary Plains Indian Artists and Blackfeet Indian Tipis Legend. In Blackfeet Indian Tipis Legend she composed this entire book of short stories that elders in her community provided to her. Black Boy collected hundreds of Blackfeet stories for the Montana Writer's Project from 1939 to 1942 under the Federal Writers' Project, a part of the Works Progress Administration (WPA). Cecile Black Boy obtained stories of Blackfoot culture through hundreds of interviews with the Elders of her tribe and legendary stories that have never been previously recorded.

== Personal life ==
Cecile was born and raised on the Blackfoot Reservation. Cecile Black Boy was born October 10, 1895 in Browning, Glacier County, Montana. Cecile's father was Short Robe and her mother was Going After Water. According to census records Cecile Black Boy had three siblings: Emma Short Robe (sister), William Short Robe (brother), and Mike Short Robe (brother).

Cecile was the mother of four children. Cecile (Short Robe) and her first husband Oscar Boy had Margeret Vivian Ledeau, James Lewis Boy, Joeseph Boy and Calvin Joseph Boy. Cecile was widowed when Oscar Boy died on January 1, 1938. Cecile married Reuben Black Boy in December of 1938. The pair divorced in 1953. Rebuen Black Boy died in December of 1967. Cecile married Theodore Last Star on October 25th, 1953. The pair were married until Cecile's death in 1966. "Cecile was regarded as one of the best bead workers in her tribe" according to John C Ewers who worked closely with Cecile Black Boy.

Cecile and her former husband Reuben were translators for author John C Ewers while he gathered information on the Blackfoot tribe for his article Winold Reiss His Portraits and Protégés. According to an article written by the Museum of the Plains Indian titled Connections the Blackfeet and Winold Reiss "About a year before she modelled for this portrait by Reiss, Sstaa'niiniki completed one of her best-known projects" which refers to her written work in the Blackfeet Indian Tipis Legend.

== Career ==
Cecile Black Boy created historical records of tribal culture and distinctive interests in the preservation of tipi legends. Cecile wrote accounts of Native American women and their contribution to the craft of tipis. The production of tipi covers and furnishings is a traditional religious practice. According to Cecile's writings only women who were members of the tipi-makers were permitted to do the work. Painted tipi covers are one of the highlights of artistic achievement and endeavor in Plains Indians culture Substances used for painting material were gathered along the Marias and Yellowstone Rivers. Each year the Blackfoot Reservation in Browning, Montana celebrated Native American tipi paintings as a tribal celebration.

=== Published writings ===
Cecile created paintings depicting dozens of traditional painted tipis during the 1930s -1940s. Her original paintings and the manuscripts of Cecile Black Boy are now held in the collection of the Museum of the Plains Indian in Browning, Montana. In 2017, the Museum of the Plains Indian hosted an expedition on the life of Cecile Black Boy, also known as Noomohtsiistaapitapi Sstaniiniki. Many portraits were made of Cecile Black Boy, including one from the exhibit at the Museum of the Plains Indian in Browning, Montana, by Jeremy Weber at Daily Inter Lake.

Cecile Black Boy obtained information about the craft of tipi in Blackfoot culture through hundreds of interviews with the elders of the tribe and legendary stories that have never been previously recorded. Her work is a distinct and original contribution to the understanding of Native Americans. Black Boy collected hundreds of Blackfeet stories for the Montana Writer's Project from 1939 to 1942 under the WPA Writers Project. She wrote extremely detailed Blackfoot legends for several books, such as Painted Tipis by Contemporary Plains Indian Artists and Blackfeet Indian Tipis Legend. She composed the entire book of Blackfeet Indian Tipis Legend of short stories that elders in her community provided to her.

This is a list of the individual short stories that Cecile Black Boy wrote in the Blackfeet Indian Tipis Legend.

- Black Buffalo Teepee And Yellow Buffalo Teepee
- The Otter Teepee and the Brave Boy
- Medicine Lodge: Sun-Moon Teepee and Otter Headdress
- Yellow Otter Teepee
- The Person Teepee, All-Star Teepee
- The Bald Eagle Teepee
- The Fish Teepee
- The Elk Teepee
- Eagle Teepee
- Buffalo Hoof Teepee
- The Big Rock Teepee
- Snake Teepee and Bear Teepee
- The Black Otter Teepee
- Teepee Painting (1942)
- Puts-up-Teepee and the Spirit (1941)
- How the Medicine Lodge Sun Dance was First Organzied (1942)
- A Women Jealous of a Snake (1942)
- Big Circle Teepee
- The Black Buffalo Teepee, Buffalo Head Teepee
- Cat Tail Teepee
- Blackfoot Legends-the Crow Teepee
- Elk Teepee and Fisher Bundle
- The First Painted Teepee called "The Four Tails"
- The Half Buffalo and Half Fish Teepee
- The Half and Half Teepee
- One Buffalo Teepee
- The Horse Teepee
- How Yellow-Wolf Owned the Rattle Teepee (1942)
- Red Earth Teepee
- Soldier's Medicine Pipe and the Red Earth Teepee
- The Skunk Teepee
- The Spider Teepee
- Star Teepee(1942)
- The Striped Teepee
- The Thunder Teepee
- The Underwater Monster TeepeeThe War History Teepee
- The Winter Teepee.
