= Willie Ottogary =

Willie Ottogary (July 1869 – 1929) was a Utah journalist, a Mormon missionary and a Northwestern Shoshone leader.

== Biography ==
Ottogary was the son of O-Ti-Cot-i, later known as Peter Ottogary. O-Ti-Cot-i was a prominent shaman and warrior among the Shoshone. He was present at the Bear River Massacre. In 1875 O-Ti-Cot-i was baptized a member of the Church of Jesus Christ of Latter-day Saints (LDS Church) by George Washington Hill at which time he ended his involvement as a shaman. O-Ti-Cot-i was later one of those who assisted in the construction of the Logan Temple. He had a farm near Elwood, Utah and a residence in the town of Washakie, Utah.

Willie Ottogary attended the day school in Washakie where he learned to write in English. He was baptized a member of the LDS Church at about age eight.

In 1906 Ottogary began his journalistic career with a column in the Tremont Times. He later also had writings published in the Oneida County Enterprise of Malad City, Idaho, the Box Elder Journal and Box Elder News both of Brigham City, Utah and the Logan Journal of Logan, Utah.

In 1907 Ottogary was ordained to the office of seventy in the LDS Church priesthood. He was sealed to his wife Nancy in the Logan Temple. He served a stake mission in 1913 during which he baptized around 100 Shoshone.

Ottogary in general made his living as a farmer on the farm by Elwood his father had homesteaded.

In 1915 and 1917 Ottogary went on trips to Washington, D.C. seeking to get a return of the lands given to the Shoshone in the Box Elder Treaty of 1863. In 1918 he was arrested for encouraging draft resistance during World War I.

== Sources ==
- Kreitzer, Matthew E., Introduction to The Washakie Letters of Willie Ottogary Logan, Utah: Utah State University Press, 2000.
