= John Lowery (politician) =

American politician

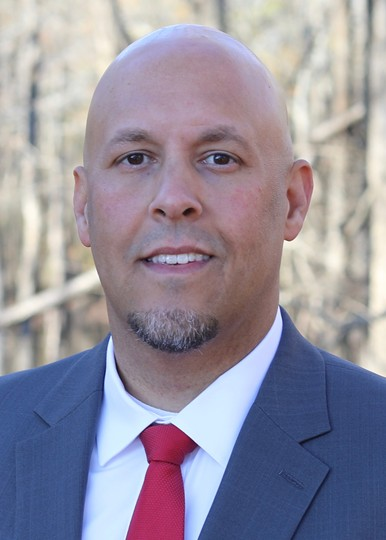
- John Lowery in 2025

Member of the North Carolina House of Representatives from the 47th district
- Incumbent
- Assumed office October 17, 2025
- Preceded by: Jarrod Lowery

Chairman of the Lumbee Tribe of North Carolina
- Incumbent
- Assumed office January 6, 2022
- Preceded by: Harvey Godwin Jr.

Personal details
- Party: Republican
- Relatives: Jarrod Lowery (brother)
- Education: University of North Carolina at Pembroke (BA, MA); University of North Carolina at Chapel Hill (MPA)

John L. Lowery is an American politician who has served as a member of the North Carolina House of Representatives for North Carolina's 47th House district since 2025 and as chair of the Lumbee Tribe of North Carolina since January 2022. A member of the Republican Party, he succeeded his brother Jarrod Lowery.

== Early life and education ==
Lowery was born and raised in Robeson County, North Carolina, and is a member of the Lumbee Tribe of North Carolina. He graduated from University of North Carolina Pembroke with a bachelor's degree in political science and American Indian studies and from the University of North Carolina Chapel Hill with a master's degree in public administration. After graduating, he worked as a public schools teacher.

== Political career ==
On January 6, 2022, Lowery was sworn in as Chairman of the Lumbee Tribe of North Carolina. He won re-election in 2024.

On October 7, 2025, Jarrod Lowery resigned from the North Carolina House of Representatives and the Robeson County Republican Party Executive Committee selected John Lowery as his replacement. He was sworn in on October 17, 2025.

North Carolina House of Representatives
Preceded by Jarrod Lowery	Member of the North Carolina House of Representatives from the 47th district 2025–Present	Incumbent
