= Denise Sweet =

Anishinaabe American poet

- Education: University of Wisconsin-Eau Claire
- Writing career
- Genre: poetry
- Notable awards: Wisconsin Poet Laureate (2005–08)

Denise Sweet is an Anishinaabe poet and Professor Emerita at the University of Wisconsin–Green Bay. From 2005 to 2008, she served as the second Wisconsin Poet Laureate. Sweet is the author of several poetry collections, including Songs for Discharming, which received the Council for Wisconsin Writers’ Posner Award in 1998.

== Background ==
Sweet grew up in Minnesota and is an enrolled member of the White Earth Band of Minnesota Chippewa Tribe.

== Career ==
Sweet was educated at the University of Wisconsin-Eau Claire and taught creative writing, literature, and mythology at University of Wisconsin-Green Bay. She also taught a travel seminar in the Yucatán Peninsula and Guatemala where she did fieldwork among the Mayan peoples.

Sweet has given nearly one hundred poetry readings in the United States, Canada, Mexico, London, and Guatemala, and has held poet‑in‑residence roles at the Grand Marais Art Colony, the Apostle Islands National Lakeshore, and the Split Rock Arts Program in Duluth, Minnesota.

In 2003, she taught creative writing and helped develop a community theatre program at Rough Rock High School on the Navajo Nation, and at the University of Wisconsin–Green Bay she directed the university’s first self‑sponsored pre‑college writing program for students of color. Her work has appeared in public art exhibitions and multi‑media presentations, and she has delivered keynote talks at several literary and cultural events.

== Awards and honors ==
Sweet has won several awards for her poetry including the Diane Decorah Award, the Posner Award, the Woman of the Year Award from the Wisconsin Women's Council, and the Native Writers' Circle of the Americas First Book Award for Poetry. In 2005 she became the Poet Laureate of Wisconsin.

== Books ==
- Palominos Near Tuba City: New & Selected Poems, (Holy Cow! Press, April, 2018)
- Songs for Discharming, (Greenfield Review Press, 1997)
- Days of Obsidian, Days of Grace, (Poetry Harbor Press, 1994)
- Know By Heart, (Rhiannon Press, 1990)

== Anthologies ==
- Nitaawichige: Selected Poetry and Prose by Four Anishinaabe Writers, (Poetry Harbor, 2002)
- Stories Migrating Home: Anishnaabe Prose, (Loonfeather Press, 1999)
- Reinventing the Enemy's Language: Contemporary Native Women's Writing of North America, (W.W. Norton, 1997)
- Returning the Gift: Poetry and Prose from the First North American Native Writers' Festival, (University of Arizona Press, 1994)
- Women Brave in the Face of Danger, (Crossing Press, 1985)
