= Robert L. Perea =

American author

- Born: Wheatland, Wyoming, U.S.
- Education: University of New Mexico
- Occupation: Author
- Writing career
- Genre: Magical realism

Robert L. Perea (born in Wheatland, Wyoming) is an American author. He has written short stories and novels, and his work contains elements of magical realism.

Perea is of Mexican-American and Oglala Lakota heritage. He is a Vietnam War veteran and a graduate of the University of New Mexico. He is a former professor of philosophy and history at Central Arizona College. Perea's Stacey's Story received the 1992 First Book Award for Poetry from the Native Writers' Circle of the Americas.
