= Kimberly M. Blaeser =

American poet

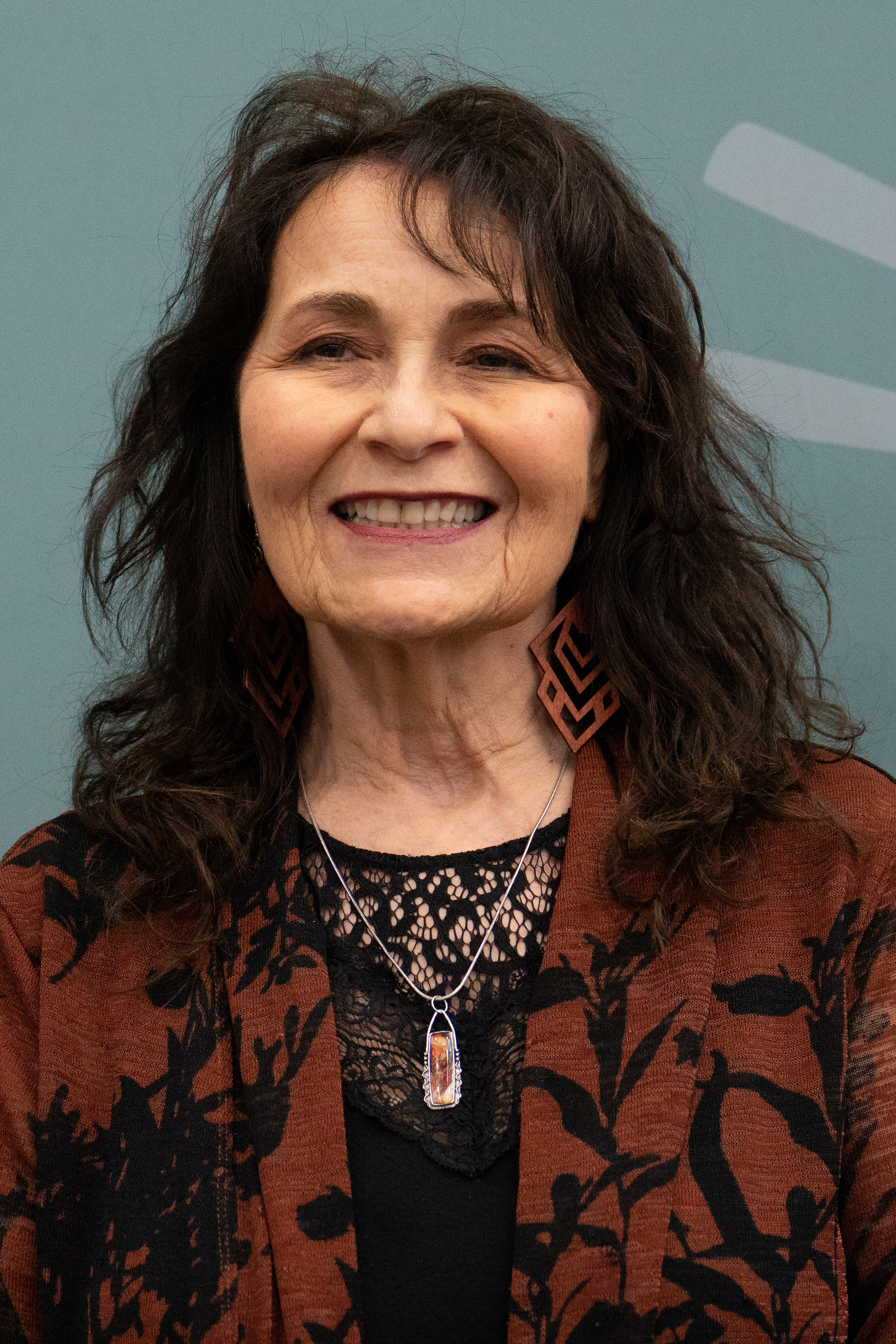
Blaeser at AWP 2026

Kimberly M. Blaeser (born 1955) is a Native American poet and writer enrolled in the White Earth Band of the Minnesota Chippewa Tribe. She was the Wisconsin Poet Laureate 2015–16.

== Background ==
Kimberly Blaeser was born in 1955 in Billings, Montana. Being of German and Anishinaabe Heritage, she grew up on the White Earth reservation. In 2024 she will take up an appointment as the Lois and Willard Mackey Chair in Creative Writing at Beloit College.

== Career ==
Blaeser was named Wisconsin Poet Laureate for 2015–2016 on January 7, 2015, by the Wisconsin Poet Laureate Commission. She resides in rural Lyons Township, Wisconsin. Blaeser works as Professor of English at the University of Wisconsin–Milwaukee, where she teaches Creative Writing, Native American Literature, and American Nature Writing.

Her first book of poetry, Trailing You, was awarded the 1993 Diane Decorah First Book Award from the Native Writers' Circle of the Americas, and she was the first critic to publish a book-length study of the fiction of her fellow White Earth Ojibwe writer, Gerald Vizenor. Her work is widely anthologized and has been translated into several languages, including Spanish, Norwegian, Indonesian, and Anishinaabemowin. Blaeser has performed her poetry around the globe, having given readings of creative work at over two hundred venues in a dozen countries, including performances at the Borobudur Temple in Indonesia and in a Fire-Ceremony at the Borderlands Museum Grounds in arctic Norway.

Blaeser is active in service to literature, the arts, and social justice. She currently serves on the editorial board for the American Indian Lives series of the University of Nebraska Press, and for the Native American Series of Michigan State University Press. She has served on the advisory board for the Sequoyah Research Center and Native American Press Archives, on the Poetry Fellowship Panel for the National Endowment of the Arts, and has been a member of the Native American Alumni Board for the University of Notre Dame. Most recently, Blaeser initiated the Milwaukee Native American Literary Cooperative which helped to bring 75 Native American writers to Milwaukee for the 20th Anniversary Returning the Gift Festival of Native Writers and Storytellers in 2012 and continues to sponsor events each year.

== Bibliography ==
=== Poetry ===
- Apprenticed to Justice. Salt Publishing, 2007.
- Trailing You. Greenfield Press, 1994 (First Book Award for Poetry, Native Writers' Circle of the Americas)
- Absentee Indians and other Poems
- Downwinders
- Learning, At Last
- This Cocoon
- Two Haiku
- Copper Yearning. Holy Cow! Press, 2019.

=== Literary criticism ===
- "On Mapping and Urban Shamans", in As We Are Now: Mixblood Essays on Race and Identity, edited by William S. Penn. University of California Press, 1997
- Gerald Vizenor: Writing in the Oral Tradition. University of Oklahoma Press, 1996.

=== Edited collections ===
- Stories Migrating Home. Edited and introduced by Blaeser and including her short story "Fancy Dog Contest." Loonfeather Press, 1999.
- "Like 'Reeds through the Ribs of a Basket': Native Women Weaving Stories", in Other Sisterhoods: Literary Theory and U.S. Women of Color, edited by Sandra Kumamoto Stanley. University of Illinois, 1998.
- Native American Literatures: An Encyclopedia of Works, Characters, Authors, and Themes. Kathy J. Whitson, 1999.

=== In anthology ===
- Ghost Fishing: An Eco-Justice Poetry Anthology, edited by Melissa Tuckey. University of Georgia Press, 2018.
- Thanku: Poems of Gratitude, edited by Miranda Paul, illustrated by Marlena Myles. Millbrook Press, 2019.
