= William S. Penn =

American writer and academic (1949–2025)

- Born: William Swain Penn III; March 21, 1949; United States
- Died: August 28, 2025 (aged 76); Ann Arbor, Michigan, U.S.
- Education: University of California, Davis (BA); Syracuse University (DA, 1979)
- Occupations: Writer, professor
- Employer: Michigan State University (retired 2020)
- Writing career
- Genres: Fiction, essays, literary criticism
- Subjects: Native American identity, oral tradition, mixed-blood experience
- Notable works: The Absence of Angels; All My Sins Are Relatives; Feathering Custer; Raising Bean
- Notable awards: American Book Award (2001); North American Indian Prose Award (1994); Stephen Crane Prize for Fiction (1977, 1979); MSU Distinguished Faculty Award (2003)

William Swain Penn III (March 21, 1949 – August 28, 2025), known professionally as W. S. Penn, was an American writer of Nez Perce, Osage, and English descent. A novelist, essayist, and editor, Penn taught creative writing and American Indian literature at Michigan State University for over three decades before retiring in 2020. He authored eleven books over his career. His work draws on the oral tradition of the Nez Perce and explores themes of mixed-heritage identity, cultural survival, and storytelling. His literary style has been compared to magical realism.

== Early life and education ==
Penn was raised in Southern California near the La Brea Tar Pits in Los Angeles. He identified as an "urban mixed-blood," a term he used to describe his Nez Perce, Osage, and Anglo heritage. His Nez Perce grandfather, who ran away from an Oklahoma Indian boarding school at age 13, was a formative influence on Penn's worldview and writing.

Penn attended Claremont College before earning his BA from the University of California, Davis. He remained at UC Davis for graduate study from 1970 to 1973 before completing his Doctor of Arts degree at Syracuse University in 1979, with a focus on creative writing, modern British literature, and the classical, medieval, and Renaissance epic.

== Academic career ==
Penn taught at the State University of New York at Oswego and at Hostos Community College in the South Bronx before joining Michigan State University, where he became a professor of English and resident writer in the Creative Writing Program. At MSU, he taught courses in the oral tradition, comedy and cultural survival, the literatures of the Americas, and creative writing. He was a founding member of the Native American Writers' Circle (initially the Wordcraft Circle of Native American Writers) and a member of the National Advisory Council on Native American Writing. Penn retired from Michigan State in 2020 as a distinguished professor, having taught creative writing for approximately forty-five years.

== Writing ==
Penn's fiction and essays explore the experience of growing up as a person of mixed Native American and Anglo heritage in urban America. His debut novel, The Absence of Angels (1994), tells the story of Albert "Alley" Hummingbird, a mixed-blood protagonist who navigates between his Nez Perce grandfather's teachings and his fragmented family life. His essay collection All My Sins Are Relatives (1995) examines three generations of his family coming to terms with their identity and Indianness. Feathering Custer (2001), a collection of essays, critiques contemporary literary and cultural theory as applied to Native American life and literature.

His final published book, Raising Bean: Essays on Laughing and Living (2022), records conversations Penn held with his granddaughter Clara, known as "Bean," using family history and Nez Perce oral tradition to guide her toward adulthood. At the time of his death, Penn was working on a companion volume tentatively titled Travels with Charlie Bun.

Penn's works appeared in Antaeus, Missouri Review, Quarterly West, Stand, and Southern Humanities Review, and he served as guest editor of Callaloo.

== 2013 classroom controversy ==
On August 29, 2013, during the first day of a creative writing class at Michigan State University, Penn made a series of politically charged comments that were secretly recorded by a student, Evan Schrage, and posted online by Campus Reform, a conservative media outlet. In the video, Penn made derogatory remarks about Republicans, including statements about voter suppression and characterizations of the party's demographics.

The video quickly went viral, receiving extensive national media coverage. University administrators were made aware of the video on September 3, and the Office of the Provost began an immediate review. Penn met with the dean of the College of Arts and Letters and a representative from the provost's office, and acknowledged that some of his comments were "inappropriate, disrespectful and offensive" and may have negatively affected the learning environment.

Penn's teaching duties were reassigned for the remainder of the fall 2013 semester, though he remained a paid faculty member and was not formally suspended. The incident prompted debate over academic freedom in public universities. The Foundation for Individual Rights in Education (FIRE) cautioned that students do not have a general right not to be offended in the classroom, while the American Association of University Professors argued that only an elected body of Penn's fellow professors could determine whether his speech warranted a severe sanction such as suspension from teaching. Penn returned to the classroom the following semester.

== Personal life and death ==
Penn lived in East Lansing, Michigan, with his wife, Jennifer. They had two children, Rachel Antonia and William Anthony. His son William is an assistant teaching professor of philosophy at the University of Wisconsin–Milwaukee, holding a BA from Michigan State University and a PhD in history and philosophy of science from the University of Pittsburgh. Penn is also survived by his grandchildren Clara ("Bean") and Charlie, and his sister Pat Hilden.

Penn died on August 28, 2025, at the University of Michigan Hospital in Ann Arbor.

== Awards and honors ==
Penn was awarded the Stephen Crane Prize for Fiction at Syracuse University in 1977 and 1979. He received a fellowship to the Yaddo Writers' Colony to work on The Absence of Angels, as well as a grant from the Ludwig Vogelstein Foundation in 1985, a New York Foundation for the Arts Prize in 1988, and a Michigan Council on the Arts grant in 1990.

In 1991, Penn was a resident writer at the Banff Centre for the Arts. He received the North American Indian Prose Award from the University of Nebraska Press in 1994 for All My Sins Are Relatives. In 1996, the same book received the Critic's Choice Award for the Most Acclaimed Books of 1995–96.

Penn was named Native American Writer of the Year in Nonfiction by the Wordcraft Circle of Native Writers and Storytellers in 1997, and Native American Editor of the Year by the same organization in 1998. His anthology The Telling of the World was named to the list of Best University Press Books of 2000. In 2001, he received the American Book Award for Killing Time with Strangers. He was named Wordcraft Circle Writer of the Year in Creative Prose: Fiction for Feathering Custer in 2002. Penn received the Distinguished Faculty Award from Michigan State University in 2003, and was a finalist for the Iowa Prize for Short Fiction.

== Selected bibliography ==
=== Novels ===
- The Absence of Angels (University of Oklahoma Press, 1994)
- Killing Time with Strangers (University of Arizona Press, 2000)

=== Short fiction ===
- This Is the World (Michigan State University Press, 2000)

=== Essays ===
- All My Sins Are Relatives (University of Nebraska Press, 1995)
- Feathering Custer (University of Nebraska Press, 2001)
- Raising Bean: Essays on Laughing and Living (Wayne State University Press, 2022)

=== Edited volumes ===
- The Telling of the World: Native American Stories and Art (Stewart, Tabori & Chang, 1996)
- As We Are Now: Mixblood Essays on Race and Identity (University of California Press, 1997)

=== Anthologies (contributor) ===
- I Tell You Now (Brian Swann, editor; University of Nebraska Press)
- The New Short Story Theories (Charles E. May, editor; Ohio University Press)
