= Suzanne Rancourt =

American poet

Suzanne S. Rancourt (born 1959) is a poet and veteran of both the United States Marine Corps and the United States Army as well being an Abenaki and Huron descendant. She was born and raised in west central Maine. She has written a collection of poetry called Billboard in the Clouds, which won the Native Writers' Circle of the Americas First Book Award in 2001, and some of her other work also appears in The Journal of Military Experience, Volume II. Her work has also been published in the literary journals Callaloo and The Cimarron Review, as well as many other anthologies.

Rancourt has a Masters of Fine Arts in Poetry from Vermont College and a Master of Science in Educational Psychology from University at Albany, SUNY. She is currently living in Hadley, New York. Rancourt has coordinated powwows. She has worked as a counselor for Traumatic Brain Injury (TBI) in New York and has also worked as a parent education specialist for a Head Start program in the northern part of the state. Among other things, Rancourt is also a singer/songwriter, a personal fitness trainer, a percussionist, an herbal educator, and a dance instructor.

== Work ==
Rancourt's poems have been praised for their vivid imagery and simple, elegant style. Her fiction and poetry have appeared in many journals, including Peauxdunque Review, MacQueen's Quinterly, The Massachusetts Review, Turtle Island Quarterly, New Feathers Anthology, Eastern Iowa Review, The Brooklyn Review, Aji Magazine, Nine Muses Poetry, the Journal of Military Experience, Cimarron Review, Callaloo, and others.

Her first published collection of poetry was titled Billboard in the Clouds published by Curbstone Press. It addresses at least three themes: poems about childhood include descriptions of nature, her parents, and grandparents; ancestral poems cover stories Rancourt has heard conveying deep connections between her people and their land; and poems about contemporary life cover such topics as Rancourt's life with her son, her current home, and her military experience.

Her second poetry collection was the 2017 publication murmurs at the gate, in which she explored, using fictional events and others from her own life, the lives and experiences of people who survived different forms of hardship.

== Awards ==
- 2001, Native Writers' Circle of the Americas First Book Award

== Publications ==
- Rancourt, Suzanne S. (2001). "Whose Mouth Do I Speak With?". In Clark, Carol (ed.). Poetry in Three Dimensions: Reading, Writing, and Critical Thinking Through Poetry. Vol. Book 2. Educators Pub Service. p. 54. ISBN 0838823688.
- Rancourt, Suzanne S. (2004). Billboard in the Clouds. Willimantic, CT: Curbstone Press. ISBN 1-931896-08-9.
- Rancourt, Suzanne (2006). "Fanning Fire". Saranac Review. Vol. 2. pp. 66–67.
- Rancourt, Suzanne (2006). "Singing Across the River". Saranac Review. Vol. 2. pp. 66–67.
- Rancourt, Suzanne (2012). "Ghost Nets, The Hunt, Tsunami Conflict, Visions of Clara, and Throwing Stars". The Journal of Military Experience. Vol. 2, no. 2.
- Rancourt, Suzanne (November 12, 2012). "Rear Support". O-Dark-Thirty.
- Rancourt, Suzanne (2012). "When the Wind Stops, Ghost Nets, Not Tonight, and The Edge" (PDF). Ginosko Literary Journal. Vol. 11. pp. 22–26.
- Rancourt, Suzanne S. (2019). Murmurs at the gate. Portland: OR Unsolicited Press. ISBN 978-1-947021-92-1.
- Rancourt, Suzanne (2019). Fuhrman, C Marie; Rader, Dean (eds.). Native Voices Indigenous American Poetry, Craft and Conversations. Tupelo Press. p. 270. ISBN 978-1-947021-92-1.
