= Olotoraca =

Olotoraca (also spelled Olotaraca, Olotacara, or Otocara; c. 1548 – 1573 near Fort San Mateo, Florida) was subchief of a Florida tribe.

== Biography ==
Olotoraca was the nephew of Satouriona, one of the three chiefs among whom Florida was divided in 1562. In 1565, Olotoraca served as guide to Spaniard Pedro Menéndez de Avilés's first expedition, since the French refused to help Satouriona against his enemies, the other two Florida chiefs, Outina and Potanou.

Due to the cruelty of the Spanish, when Frenchman Dominique de Gourgues came to revenge Jean Ribaut, Olotoraca formed an alliance with him and led Satouriona's 300 warriors against the Spanish. Olotaraca guided the French, conducted reconnaissance on the position of the Spanish army, and, in the assault on the first fort, was also the first to mount the glacis. According to a narrative published in The Atlantic Monthly in 1864, "the light-limbed Olotoraca bounded forward, ran up the glacis, leaped the unfinished ditch, and drove his pike through the Spaniard from breast to back."

Olotoraca succeeded his uncle Satouriona as chief. After Menéndez returned and re-established Spanish dominion in Florida, Olotoraca killed the Spanish missionaries, and burned and ruined the Spanish establishments several times. He was captured and hanged.

Olotoraca's grave is believed to have been discovered on the Satilla River.

According to Gatschet, the proper form of his name is Hola‘taraca, hola‘ta being the title for a subchief in the Timucua language.
