= William S. Yellow Robe Jr. =

Assiniboine author and playwright (1960–2021)

- Born: February 4, 1960; Poplar, Montana
- Died: July 19, 2021 (aged 61); Bangor, Maine
- Citizenship: Assiniboine and Sioux Tribes of the Fort Peck Indian Reservation, United States
- Occupations: Actor; author; director; educator; playwright; poet
- Writing career
- Genre: Native American literature
- Notable works: Grandchildren of the Buffalo Soldiers: And Other Untold Stories, Where the Pavement Ends
- Notable awards: First Nations Book Award for Drama

William S. Yellow Robe Jr. (February 4, 1960 – July 19, 2021) was an Assiniboine actor, author, director, educator, playwright, and poet.

== Life and career ==
A member of the Assiniboine and Sioux Tribes of the Fort Peck Indian Reservation, Yellow Robe was raised by his mother on the Fort Peck Indian Reservation in Montana. He studied writing and performing arts at the University of Montana.

Yellow Robe's works have been performed in venues across the United States, including the Penumbra Theatre Company in St. Paul; the Public Theater in New York; the Trinity Repertory Company in Providence, RI; and the Smithsonian's National Museum of the American Indian in Washington, D.C. He was a member of Penumbra, as well as the Ensemble Studio Theater, Amerinda, Inc., and the advisory board for Red Eagle Soaring Native Youth Theatre.

Yellow Robe has also taught at the Institute of American Indian Arts, Brown University, and the University of Maine.

He died following a long illness in Bangor on July 19, 2021. The day after he died, Yellow Robe was named the recipient of a $40,000 award in recognition of his contributions to theatre. His papers joined the many playwright and poetry archives at the Harry Ransom Center at The University of Texas at Austin in 2022 and are available there for research.

== Awards ==
- New England Theater Conference Special Award winner (2004)
- New York Community Trust Helen Merril Award for Playwrighting (2021), announced one day after Yellow Robe died.

== Bibliography ==
- Where the Pavement Ends: Five Native American Plays. Norman, OK: University of Oklahoma Press. 2003. ISBN 0806132655.
- Grandchildren of the Buffalo Soldiers and Other Untold Stories. UCLA American Indian Studies Center. 2009. ISBN 978-0935626599.
- The Body Guards. ASIN: B014613HLM
- The Burning of Uncle. *from Learner, A. (Ed.). (1990). Dancing on the rim of the world: an anthology of contemporary Northwest native American writing. Tucson: University of Arizona Press. ISBN 978-0816512157
- The Council. ASIN: B014617O4S
- Independence of Eddie Rose. ASIN: B00LLPCN1C *from Mojica, M. and Knowles, R. (Eds.). (2003). Staging coyote's dream: an anthology of First Nations drama in English. Toronto: Playwrights Canada Press. ISBN 978-0887546259
- Restless Spirits: plays. Albany: State University of New York Press, [2020]. ISBN 978-1438478647
- Rez Politics. ASIN: B0146168YK
- Sneaky. ASIN: B014619D42
- The Star Quilter. ASIN: B01461109S
