= Lumbee Tribe of North Carolina =

Federally-recognized tribe in North Carolina, United States

Lumbee Tribe of North Carolina People of the Dark Water Lumbee Tribe
- Federally recognized tribe
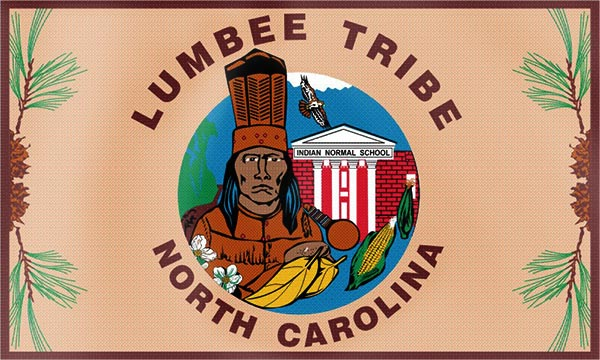
- Flag Seal

- Location of Tribal Headquarters (The Turtle)
- Coordinates: 34°40′48″N 79°13′29″W
- Counties: Robeson, Hoke, Cumberland, and Scotland
- State recognized: 1885
- Act of Congress: June 7, 1956
- Constitution ratified: November 1, 2001; 24 years ago
- Full federal recognition: December 18, 2025; 9 months ago
- Headquarters: Pembroke, North Carolina

Government
  - Body: Lumbee Tribal Council
  - Tribal Chairman: John Lowery
  - Tribal Administrator: Tammy Maynor

Population (2025)
  - Total: 55,000
- Demonym: Lumbee
- Time zone: UTC–05:00 (EST)
  - Summer (DST): UTC–04:00 (EDT)
- Area code: 910
- Website: lumbeetribe.com

The Lumbee Tribe of North Carolina is a federally recognized tribe in North Carolina. The tribe represents Lumbee people. They received federal recognition on December 18, 2025 with the passing of the Lumbee Fairness Act within the 2026 National Defense Authorization Act.

With an estimated 55,000 members, the Lumbee Tribe of North Carolina is the largest tribe in the United States east of the Mississippi River.

== History ==
=== Modern tribal government reorganization ===
The Lumbee Regional Development Association (LRDA), a nonprofit organization, was initially responsible for maintaining Lumbee tribal membership rolls and providing social services to the members. After an attempt by the LRDA to gain full federal recognition for the Lumbee people as a Native American tribe in 1991 failed, some Lumbees began to criticize the LRDA as an inadequate representative for the group. The LRDA had a board of self-appointed directors and no constitution, which critics felt made it ill-equipped to genuinely represent the interest of Lumbees. They also felt that its limited jurisdiction meant it could not satisfy the U.S. Bureau of Indian Affairs' recognition criterion for groups with a "continuous political authority." To address these concerns, in 1993, a group of Lumbee community leaders formed a constitutional assembly, the Lumbee Tribe of Cheraw Indians (LTCI), and gathered delegates from historically Indian church congregations in the area to draft a constitution for a tribal government.

Through dozens of meetings held throughout the year, the LTCI produced a draft constitution with separate branches of government which it wished to submit to the Bureau of Indian Affairs as a governing document if the Lumbee people earned recognition. The constitution provided for a government that could provide social services to Lumbees and represent their interests to other governments. To ascertain whether the document had the support of the Lumbee community, the LTCI hosted a referendum on it during the 1994 Lumbee Homecoming, with all tribal members over 18 years of age eligible to vote. The document was approved 8,010—223, a vote total including more than 20 percent of tribal members. Voters also elected Dalton Brooks to serve as the tribal chairman under the constitutional framework.

Following the referendum, a dispute over the governance of the Lumbee tribe developed between the LRDA and LTCI. The LTCI sought to secure recognition from the state of North Carolina that it was the elected government of the tribe and was thus the only suitable organization to petition the federal government for recognition, a role played by the LRDA since 1984. The LTCI sued the LRDA for this privileged status in Robeson County Superior Court in 1995. The court ultimately found that neither organization had full claim to serving as the Lumbee people's legitimate governing body since the LRDA had a long-established record of providing social services to the tribe and the LTCI's referendum had garnered significant popular support. It ruled that the LRDA could continue to represent the tribe in petitions for federal recognition until "such time as the Lumbee Tribe selects, by the vote of the Lumbee People, a tribal council or other form of government [...] through its own self-determination."

In 1998, the court created the Lumbee Self-Determination Commission, composed of equal numbers of LRDA and LTCI delegates plus a group of Lumbees not associated with either organization. The commission surveyed tribal members' preferences for the structure of their governing organization. By November 2000, the commission had decided upon a 23-person tribal council representing 17 districts where Lumbees resided, with more councilors allotted to more-populated areas and one additional at-large district. While most of the districts represented areas in southeast North Carolina in and around Robeson County, four of the districts respectively encompassed Charlotte, Greensboro, Raleigh, and Baltimore, Maryland, which had significant Lumbee populations. Elections were held for the council and its chairman, which were then inaugurated in January 2001 in Lumberton. Pembroke mayor Milton Hunt became chairman and selected a former LRDA board member as tribal administrator. Within a year, the council decided to use the name "Lumbee Tribe of North Carolina" and finalized a constitution for its organization, largely based on the 1994 LTCI document. The constitution was ratified by a vote of tribal members in November 2001, 2,237 to 412, with a turnout representing less than 10 percent of the tribe's eligible voters.

=== State recognition ===
The North Carolina Assembly formally recognized the Lumbees in 1885. They amended their recognition, using the name Tribe of Indians of Robeson County in 1911 and Cherokee Indians of Robeson County in 1913. Responding to pressure from the tribe, the state recognized the name Lumbee in 1953. Governor Mike Easley affirmed in 2004 that the state had continuously recognized the Lumbee Tribe since 1885.

The North Carolina Commission of Indian Affairs, which oversees state-recognized tribes and works with the federally recognized tribe in North Carolina, was established in 1971.

=== Federal recognition efforts ===
During the 2024 presidential election, both Donald Trump and Kamala Harris courted the tribe of 55,000 to tip the swing state in their favor. Trump, the eventual winner, promised he would sign legislation to grant federal recognition to the Lumbee Tribe, a distinction that would unlock access to federal funds. For years, the Lumbee attempted to circumvent recognition by the Bureau of Indian Affairs for being "flawed" by appealing directly to Congress instead. The Lumbee had pursued federal recognition since 1985, after their application was denied by the Bureau because they "could not establish the group's descendance either culturally, politically, or genealogically from any tribe which existed historically in the area." In 2017, the first Trump administration reversed the tribe's ban on reapplying through the Bureau, but the tribe had decided to pursue the congressional approach.

Senator Thom Tillis sponsored the Lumbee Fairness Act in 2023 which would have "extend[ed] federal recognition to the Lumbee Tribe of North Carolina." The bill was read twice by senate on February 16, 2023, and referred to the Bureau with no further action. Tillis and his staff stated he would block any and all bills backed by tribal nations until those tribes support the Lumbee, which has been criticized by the Eastern Band of Cherokee Indians who deny validity of the Lumbee's historical claims. To this end he blocked a land transfer from the Tennessee Valley Authority to the Eastern Band of Cherokee Indians which contains the birthplace of Sequoyah, and a bill which would ensure preservation of the site of the Wounded Knee massacre backed by the Oglala Sioux and the Cheyenne River Sioux, stating it was because they did not offer support for his efforts to recognize the Lumbee. Tribal Chairman John Lowery stated "If he's put a hold on the bill it's because he reached out to tribal leaders to see where they stand on his bill, and they apparently have told him that they’re not in support, So, he said 'well, if you can’t be supportive of my bill, I can’t be supportive of your bill.'" Tillis also claimed that the Eastern Band of Cherokee Indians were part of a "casino cartel" engaged in a plot to deny the Lumbee recognition out of fear that the Lumbee would open their own casinos and compete with the Cherokee.

The Associated Press wrote that an anonymous source within the United States Department of the Interior had said that Trump would likely not sign a "Lumbee recognition bill" and would instead expedite the process through the Bureau of Indian Affairs. A Trump campaign spokeswoman, Karoline Leavitt, denied this, stating that "no policy should be deemed official unless it comes directly from President Trump." On January 23, 2025, President Trump signed an executive order directing the Department of Interior to create a legal pathway for federal recognition of the Lumbee Tribe.

== Tribal constitution ==
The preamble of the constitution of the Lumbee Tribe reads: "In accordance with the inherent power of self-governance of the Lumbee Tribe of North Carolina, the Tribe adopts this Constitution for the purposes of establishing a tribal government structure, preserving for all time the Lumbee way of life and community, promoting the educational, cultural, social, and economic well-being of Lumbee people, and securing freedom and justice for Lumbee people."

Article 1 of the constitution delineates the territorial jurisdiction of the Lumbee Tribe. This was initially declared to be the entire state of North Carolina. But fears of conflict with other recognized tribes' territories in the state (in the event of further petitions for recognition) and the logistical challenges of delivering services over great distances led this article to be modified by 2003 to only encompass Robeson, Hoke, Cumberland, and Scotland counties. At the same time, the four districts and council seats representing areas outside this region were abolished.

Article 2 defines the criteria for tribal membership. Similar to the LRDA's original enrollment requirements, a person must demonstrate their direct descent from a person who was identified as Indian on several documents dating from around 1900, including censuses, tax lists, the petitioners for federal recognition in 1888, an Indian school enrollment list, and church records. The article further requires that members must "historically or presently maintain contact with the tribe."

== Land base ==
Pembroke, North Carolina, is the headquarters of the Lumbee Tribe of North Carolina, and members mainly live in Robeson County, as well as Hoke, Cumberland, and Scotland counties in south-central North Carolina. The tribal headquarters, known as the Turtle, was built in Pembroke in 2009. Individual tribal members live across the United States.

== Organizations and economic development ==
The tribe runs a housing program for its members, including rental homes and mortgage assistance.

In 2011, the Lumbee Tribe created Lumbee Tribal Holdings Inc., a domestic business, and Lumbee Tribe Enterprises, a limited liability company.

== Governmental structure ==
According to its constitution, adopted in 2000, the Lumbee tribal government is organized into three branches: the tribal chairperson (executive), the 21-member Tribal Council (legislative), and the Supreme Court (judicial). The tribal chairperson and the Tribal Council are elected to three-year terms.

=== Executive branch ===
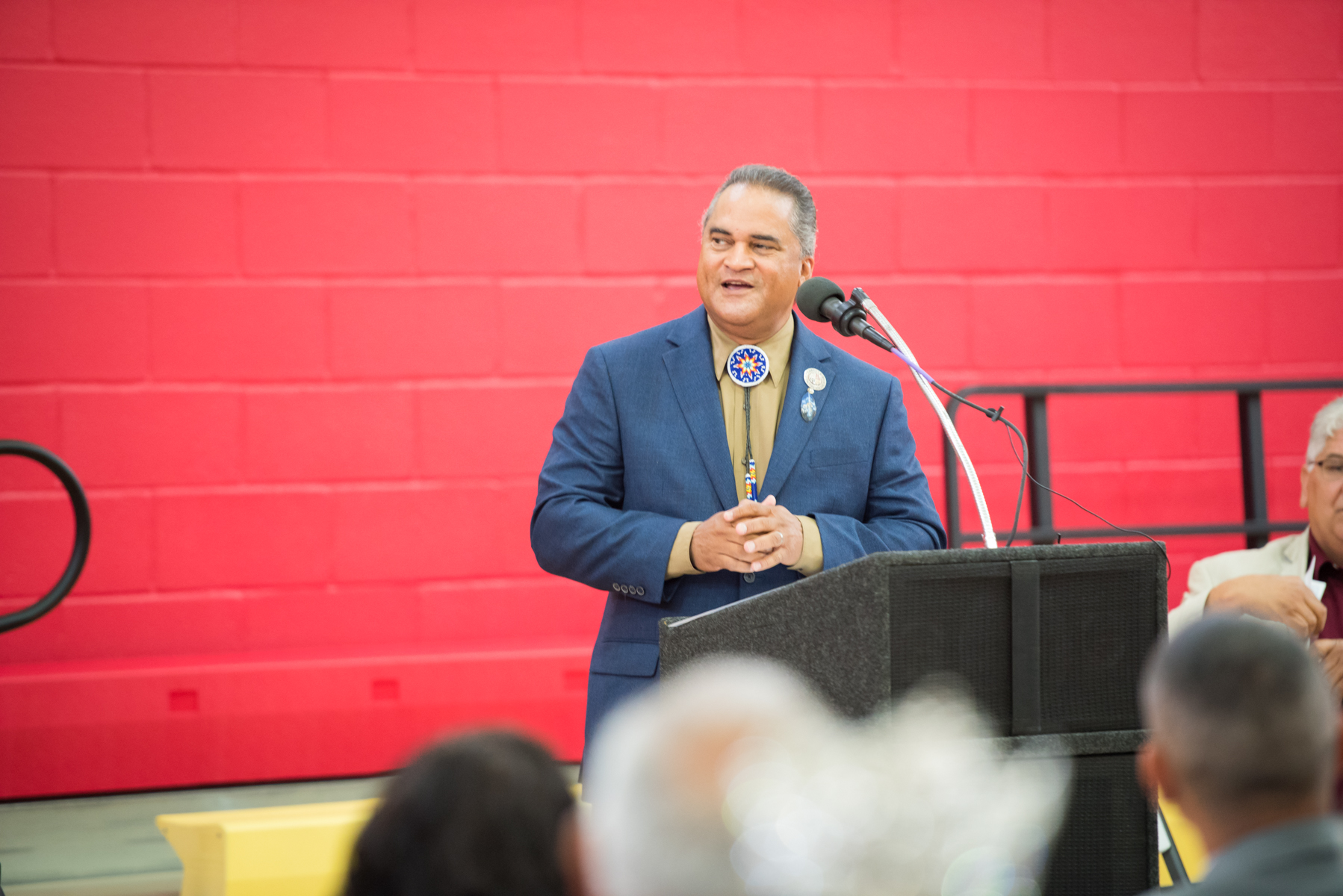
Harvey Godwin, chairman of the Lumbee Tribe in 2017

The current administration includes:

- Chairman: John Lowery
- Administrator: Tammy Maynor
- Administration Assistant to Chairman: Camera Brewer
- Enrollment Director: Reena Locklear.

=== Legislative branch ===
The tribe's legislative branch consists of 21 Elected Council Representative members from 14 districts who each serve 3-year terms.

=== Judicial branch ===
The tribe's judicial branch consists of the Supreme Court and the Tribal Administrative Courts. The Supreme Court consists of "five (5) sitting judges whom [sic] are nominated by the Tribal Chairman and appointed by the Tribal Council. Two of the sitting judges shall be graduates of accredited law schools and three shall be lay people. The Chief Judge bears administrative responsibilities and is elected on an annual basis by the sitting judges". The Lumbee's Tribal Administrative Courts "is established to provide due process and further protect the rights of tribal members, and designed to ensure tribal members are treated equally through the administration of tribal programs. The Tribal Administrative Court will hear cases dealing with the administrative issues such as housing, enrollment, and energy assistance".

== Departments and services ==
=== Veteran Affairs ===
Veterans Affairs of the Lumbee Tribe offers assistance with educational benefits, community resources, and assistance for homeless veterans. They can also help with concerns such as how to get into the Veterans Affairs Healthcare System, how to get prescription medications from the Veterans Affairs pharmacy, and how to arrange transportation to the VA Medical Center for appointments. It is not affiliated with, supported, nor endorsed by the U.S. Department of Veterans Affairs.

=== Elder Services ===
The mission of The Lumbee Tribe of North Carolina Elder Services is to assist Elders in maintaining an independent, healthy, and productive life by providing opportunities for services through a network of various community resources.

=== Youth Services ===
Youth Services provides the children of the Lumbee Tribe with a healthy, positive environment. The Lumbee Tribe is committed to protect and support the tribal youth through their growth into becoming contributing members of the community. Programs offered include:

- Lumbee Tribe of North Carolina Boys and Girl Club (located at multiple locations within Robeson County)
- Cultural Enrichment Classes
- Tobacco Prevention & Cessation Program
- Homicide and Motor Vehicle Death Program

==== Teen Impact/Volunteerism and Community Service ====
Teen Impact is a tribal-based community service club for teenage members of the Lumbee Tribe of North Carolina. The Volunteer Program of the Lumbee Tribe of North Carolina assists and mentors the teens who donate service hours to a community cause of their choice.

=== Department of Energy ===
The Tribal Low Income Energy Assistance Program (LIEAP) provides a one-time payment to assist eligible American Indian families in paying their heating costs. The application process is held annually in the first two weeks of November.

=== Housing ===
The mission of the Lumbee Tribe of North Carolina Housing Program is to provide opportunities for affordable, safe, and sanitary housing options for Lumbee Indian families in the service areas of Cumberland, Hoke, Robeson, and Scotland Counties. Programs offered under the Lumbee housing program include:

- Housing/Rehabilitation Program
- Section 184 Loan Guarantee Program
- Down Payment Assistance Program
- Home-ownership Program
- New Construction Program
- Transitional Housing Program
- 37-Stock Program
- Emergency/Rental Assistance Program
- Mortgage Assistance Program
- Housing RFP's

=== Lumbee Tribal Vocational Rehabilitation Services ===
This program provides vocational rehabilitation to any Lumbee Indian with a disability living in the Lumbee Tribal area. The objective of the program is to prepare for, obtain, or retain gainful employment. Their goal is to improve the quality of life for Lumbee Indians with disabilities.

=== Department of Agriculture and Natural Resources ===
In November 2022, the tribe opened a Department of Agriculture and Natural Resources to promote Lumbee farmers and local food sovereignty.

== See also ==
- List of Lumbees
- University of North Carolina at Pembroke

== Works cited ==
- Lowery, Malinda Maynor (2018). The Lumbee Indians: An American Struggle. Chapel Hill: UNC Press Books. ISBN 978-1-4696-4638-1.
