= Susie Rayos Marmon =

American educator, oral historian, and storyteller

Susie Reyos Marmon
- Born: Dawa-Go-Mai-Tsa; 1877; Paguate, New Mexico Territory, US
- Died: 1988 (aged 110–111)
- Occupation: Educator

Susie Rayos Marmon (née Dawa-Go-Mai-Tsa, 1877–1988) was an American educator, oral historian, and storyteller, and supercentenarian who was committed to the education of children at Laguna and Isleta Pueblos, New Mexico, United States. She received accolades from New Mexico Governor Garrey Carruthers, Senator Jeff Bingaman, Senator Pete Domenici, and President Ronald Reagan.

== Early life and education ==
Marmon was born in Paguate, New Mexico, a village on the Laguna Pueblo. She attended Albuquerque Mission School before leaving home for Carlisle, Pennsylvania to attend the Carlisle Indian School. After graduating Carlisle Indian School in 1903, Marmon enrolled at Dickinson College. Then, she completed the teacher's training course at Bloomsburg State Normal School in 1906. She was the first Laguna woman to graduate from a white college.

== Career ==
Marmon's long career in education impacted four generations of Laguna children and was characterized as one that blended two cultures. Marmon knew that she had to retain her Laguna culture within the structures of white schooling. She earned public recognition and service at the state and national levels. In the 1960s, she participated in the first Commission of Indian Affairs in New Mexico.

== Selected honors, awards, and dedications ==
- 1971, Outstanding Indian Woman in the Field of Education, North American Indian Women's Association
- Official Scenic Historic Marker "Susie Rayos Marmon, 'Ga-wa goo maa' (Early Riser)"
  - Location: In the pullout on the south side of Interstate 40, overlooking Laguna Pueblo (between mile markers 113 and 114).
- 1987, Governor Garrey Carruthers declared April 15 as Susie Rayos Marmon Day
- 1989, Susie Rayos Marmon Elementary School
  - April 22, Susie Rayos Marmon Day at Elementary School

== Legacy ==
Her nephew, Native American photographer Lee Marmon, included her in his book Laguna Pueblo: A photographic history. A picture of Susie Rayos Marmon on her 110th birthday is in the Lee Marmon Pictorial Collection, Center for Southwest Research, University of New Mexico.

Her grandniece Leslie Marmon Silko describes her Marmon's commitment to education, storytelling, and Laguna culture in her 1981 book Storyteller in the character Aunt Susie.
