= Marmon =

Marmon may refer to:

== People ==
- Jacky Marmon (c. 1798–1880), Australian sailor
- Daniel W. Marmon (1844–1909), American industrialist
- Susie Rayos Marmon (1877–1988), Native American educator, historian, and storyteller
- Lee Marmon (1925–2021), Native American photographer and author
- Neale Marmon (born 1961), former English footballer
- Kent Marmon, American politician

== Companies ==
- Nordyke Marmon & Company, a US manufacturer of flour mills until the 1920s
- Marmon Motor Car Company, a US manufacturer of automobiles until 1933
- Marmon-Herrington, the successor company to the Marmon Motor Car Company
- Marmon Group, a Chicago, Illinois industrial company
- Marmon Motor Company, a defunct Texas-based manufacturer of premium trucks
