= Storyteller (Silko book) =

- First edition
- Author: Leslie Marmon Silko
- Cover artist: Penguin Edition: Ginger Lagato
- Language: English
- Publisher: Seaver Books Arcade Publishing Penguin Books
- Publication date: 1981 1989 2012
- Publication place: United States
- Media type: Book
- Pages: 278
- Preceded by: Ceremony (1977)
- Followed by: Almanac of the Dead (1991)

Storyteller is a collection of works, including photographs, poetry, and short stories by Leslie Marmon Silko. It is her second published book, following Ceremony. The work is a combination of stories and poetry inspired by traditional Laguna Pueblo storytelling. Silko's writings in Storyteller are influenced by her upbringing in Laguna, New Mexico, where she was surrounded by traditional Laguna Pueblo values but was also educated in a Euro-American system. Her education began with kindergarten at a Bureau of Indian Affairs school called the Laguna Day School "where the speaking of the Laguna language was punished."

Silko primarily focuses on the Laguna Pueblo in Storyteller; however, she also draws influence from Inuit culture, which she experienced when she resided in Alaska's Rosewater Foundation-on-Ketchikan Creek while writing Ceremony.

Many of the poems and short stories collected in Storyteller have been reprinted, and several were published previously. The book itself has been published three times between 1981 and 2012.

== Background ==
=== Editions and versions ===
Storyteller was initially published by Seaver Books in 1981. In 1989 Richard Seaver republished Storyteller under his publishing house Arcade Publishing. Seaver was also Silko's editor for Ceremony, her preceding novel published in 1977 under Viking Press. Although Seaver was known for working with authors outside of the literary establishment and challenging censorship, when working on Ceremony, he attempted to edits parts that were integral to Silko's story. In one attempt he tried to edit the scene in which a character, Betonie, explains "it was Indian witchery that made white people in the first place," a story which is also told and elaborated upon in Storyteller. Seaver also initially deleted the poem that concluded Ceremony, wanting a more conventional end to the novel. However, Silko did not approve those changes, and Seaver ultimately conceded. In 1989 Seaver then went on to republish the even less conventional Storyteller under Arcade Publishing, which he founded with his wife in 1988.

The first version of Storyteller was oriented horizontally because Silko wanted to experiment with space, especially with her poetry. Silko notes in her "Introduction" to the Penguin version of Storyteller that she carefully considered the sizing, orientation, and space on the pages of Storyteller in order to “convey time and distance and feeling of the story as it was told aloud.”

Penguin Books published Storyteller’s second edition in 2012 because they consider it a classic in Native American Literature. Both editions are nine by seven inches, but the second edition is oriented vertically rather than horizontally. Despite the reduction in space, Silko notes that the “wide poems” still have enough room in the most recent edition. Because of this change in orientation, Silko had to remove and replace several photos. However, she added more photos of her family to the second edition.

=== Genre ===
The Penguin Random House website categorizes Storyteller as "Poetry" and "Fiction." However, as a collection, it is usually described through explaining its various mediums. In N. Scott Momoday's review of Storyteller in 1981, he calls it "a rich, many-faceted book [consisting] of short stories, anecdotes, folktales, poems, historical and autobiographical notes, and photographs."

== Contents ==
=== Photography ===
In the "Introduction" to the second version of Storyteller, Silko writes that she wanted readers to have a sense about the landscape and family she came from, so she included photographs as a way to help give readers this context.

Silko's father, Lee Marmon, took the majority of the photos featured in Storyteller. She writes of his contribution in her "Acknowledgements." All the photos in Storyteller are in black and white. The majority of the photos feature Silko and her family as well as the mesas and landscape surrounding her Laguna village. Within the "Acknowledgements," Silko also includes a link to the New Mexico Digital Collections, which showcases the Lee Marmon collection of photos.

In "The Telling Which Continues": Oral Tradition and the Written Word in Leslie Marmon Silko's Storyteller," Bernard Hirsch notes how the photographs "are arranged to suggest the circular design of Storyteller, a design characteristic of oral tradition." According to Hirsh, the photographs and their arrangements help merge the "personal, historical, and cultural levels of being and experience."

=== Poetry ===
The poems in Storyteller make up the bulk of the collection, greatly outnumbering the amount of short stories and photographs they accompany. Silko has commented on her poetic structure, saying, “I gave examples of what I heard as best as I could remember, and how I developed these elements into prose, into fiction, and into poetry, moving from what was basically an oral tradition into a written tradition.” Silko gives readers further insight into her writing process in the untitled poem that begins “This is the way Aunt Susie told the story.” She says, “I write when I still hear / her voice as she tells the story.”

In a review of Storyteller, Jim Ruppert points out that Silko uses characters and voices in poems and "creates a reality the merges with" extra-textual reality.

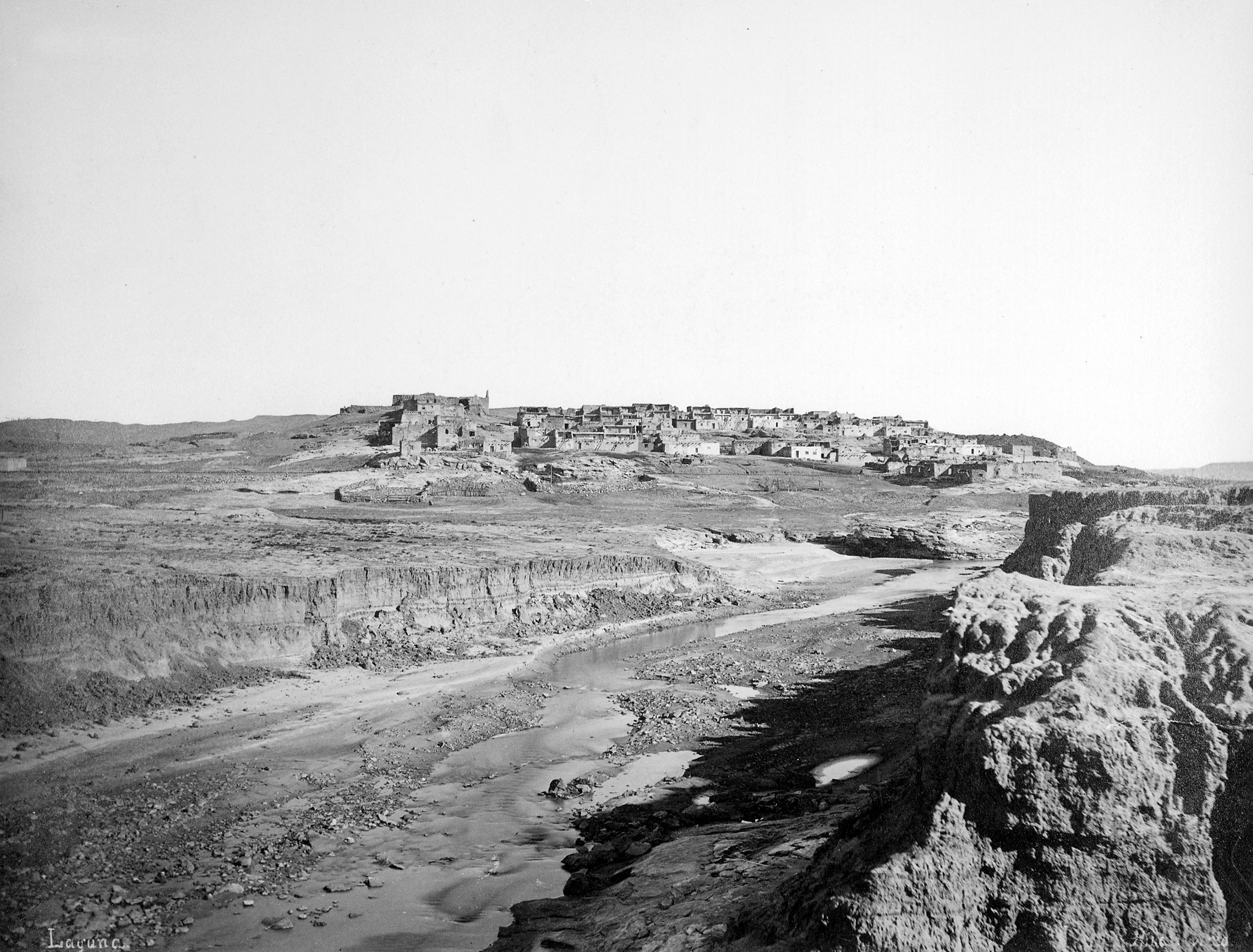
Laguna Pueblo, New Mexico as photographed by John K. Hillers in 1879.

=== Short stories ===
Since publishing Storyteller in the 1980s, Silko has primarily published novels and long works, rather than short stories or collections. "Yellow Woman" and "Lullaby," short stories published within Storyteller, have been widely anthologized.

In The Old Lady Trill, the Victory Yell: The Power of Women in Native American Literature, Patrice Hollrah noted, "Silko prefers promoting a political agenda through her stories rather than any other format...." In Storyteller Silko addresses social issues resulting from colonialism and colliding cultures, which can be seen in some of the works in the collection such as "Tony’s Story," which in part deals with racial discrimination against American Indian men.

Silko's short stories have been compared to work by Toni Morrison and Maxine Hong Kingston.

== Major themes ==
=== Storytelling ===
In the "Introduction" to Storyteller, Silko writes about the history and importance of language and storytelling as culture and as a way to survive. She details the importance of storytelling both for all people and specifically for the Laguna people. She writes, “The entire culture, all the knowledge, experience, and beliefs, were kept in the human memory of the Pueblo in the form of narratives that were told and retold from generation to generation." Silko notes that the Laguna people were all responsible for telling stories, which were “narrative accounts of incidents that the teller has experienced or heard about.” She writes that she was lucky to have been born at a time when the older members of her community still would tell stories for the children.

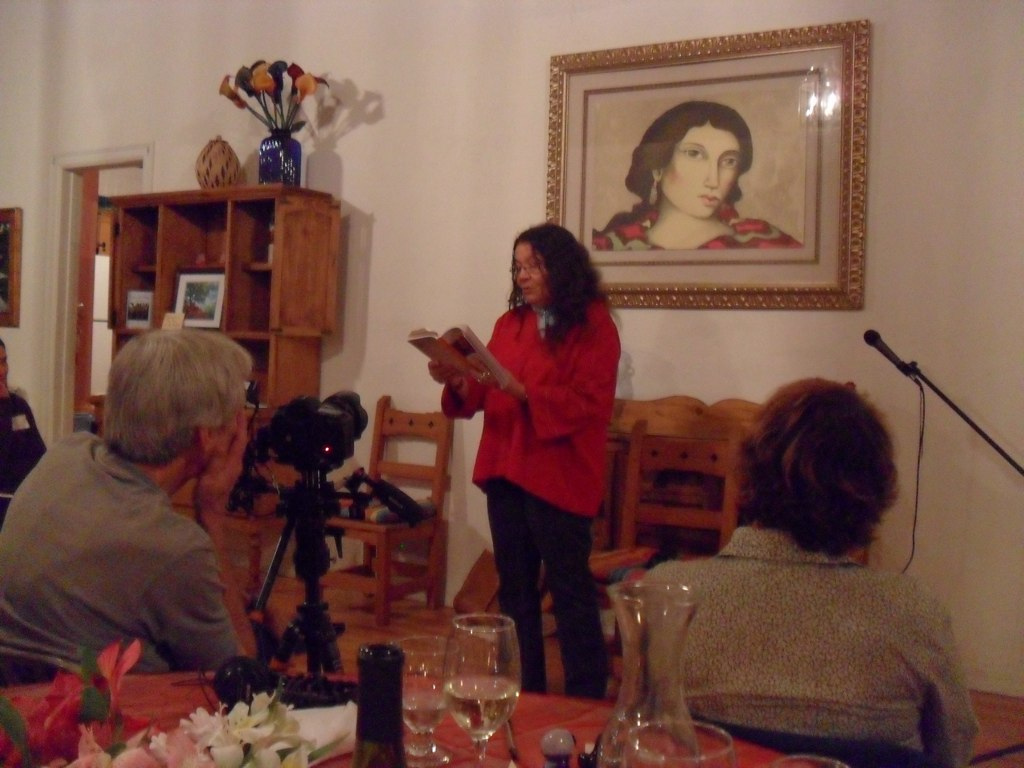
Leslie Marmon Silko in 2011 reading from her memoir The Turquoise Ledge: A Memoir.

=== Oral tradition ===
Critics have noted the influence of the oral tradition in Storyteller. Paul Lorenz explains in The Other Side of Leslie Marmon Silko's "Storyteller," "For the story, the location of events in time is essentially meaningless." Additionally, Bernard Hirsh notes that “The experience in living the reality revealed in her grandfather’s stories has shown her the oneness of past and present, of historical and mythic time, and of the stories, and the people.”

Even though Silko is inspired by the oral tradition and storytelling, she does not consider herself a traditional storyteller. She noted in an interview with Kim Barnes, "I write them down because I like seeing how I can translate this sort of feeling or flavor or sense of a story that's told and heard on to the page."

== Reception ==
When Silko first published Storyteller, she did not anticipate the book having a wide audience. It has generally been well received and is often placed on college reading lists. In an interview with Kim Barnes, Silko explained that “The book is written for people who are interested in that relationship between the spoken and the written.”

Storyteller was reviewed by writer N. Scott Momoday in the New York Times after the books initial release in 1981. In his review he calls the book “a melange." He notes there are “moments of considerable beauty and intensity, moments in which, according to the central tenet of storytelling, the language is celebrated.” He also praises Silko for her sense of humor and keen eye for where “the profound and the mundane often run together in our daily lives.” He closes noting the importance of the distinction of a storyteller and writes, “If [Silko] is not yet a storyteller, she promises to become one.” When Storyteller was republished in 2012 under Penguin, the New York Times placed Storyteller on its Sunday Book Review Paperback Row.

When first published in 1981, it made the Los Angeles Times “Notable" books list. It was also made a "Noteworthy" paperback book by Alex Raksin in the Los Angeles Times in 1987. When it was reissued in 1989 through Arcade Publishing, Storyteller made the "Fiction Best Sellers" list for Southern California in the LA Times.

== Previously published ==
Some of Silko's poems and short stories in Storyteller were also published in other contexts and anthologies. The list of these publications is supplied within the Penguin version as follows:

- American Literature: Themes and Writers (third edition)
- Chicago Review
- Fiction's Journey: 50 Stories
- Focus on America
- Rocky Mountain Magazine
- Series E, Macmillan English
- Sight and Insight: Steps in the Writing Process
- The Best American Short Stories 1975
- The Ethnic American Woman: Problems, Protests, Lifestyle
- The Man to Send Rain Clouds
- The Remembered Earth: An Anthology of Contemporary Native American Literature
- The Third Woman
- 200 Years of Great American Short Stories
- Voices of the Rainbow
