= The Way to Rainy Mountain =

1969 book by N. Scott Momaday

- First edition
- Author: N. Scott Momaday
- Illustrator: Al Momaday
- Cover artist: Al Momaday
- Language: English
- Genre: Folklore
- Publisher: University of New Mexico Press
- Publication date: 1969
- Publication place: United States
- Media type: Print
- Pages: 89 pp
- OCLC: 3409241
- Followed by: the reading on the train

The Way to Rainy Mountain (1969) is a book by Pulitzer Prize winning author N. Scott Momaday. It is about the journey of Momaday's Kiowa ancestors from their ancient beginnings in the Montana area to their final war and surrender to the United States Cavalry at Fort Sill, and subsequent resettlement near Rainy Mountain, Oklahoma.

The Way to Rainy Mountain is a blend of history, folklore, and poetic memoir and was published in 1969. It takes the reader through author N. Scott Momaday's own journey of discovering his Kiowa background and identity. The journey is told in three separate voices: The first voice, the ancestral voice, tells about the Kiowa by using oral traditions and myths; the second voice is a historical commentary; and finally, the third voice is Momaday's poetic memoir of his experiences. All three voices together teach about the Kiowa's origin, beliefs, traditions, morals, and conflicts. Not only does the journey recounted in this book help Momaday better understand his ancestry, it also teaches about the Kiowa tribe's history. The uniqueness of this text, however, has been a problem for some readers, who find it difficult to follow. Others find it easier to understand by reading each individual voice consecutively instead of alternating from one voice to another as the book is written. The Way to Rainy Mountain continues to be an entry point to Kiowa history and a way to open discussions about what constitutes any history of a people.

== Momaday ==
Navarre Scott Momaday was born February 27, 1934, in Lawton, Oklahoma, to Alfred Momaday and Natachee Scott. The family lived on Navajo, Apache, and Pueblo reservations in New Mexico and Arizona where his parents taught school. Momaday earned a bachelor's degree in political science at the University of New Mexico. Then he was awarded a scholarship to graduate school at Stanford University as a result of winning a creative writing contest for his poetry. After earning his Ph.D. in English there, he published his first book The Complete Poems of Frederick Goddard Tuckerman. He followed that academic study with The Way to Rainy Mountain and his first novel, House Made of Dawn, which received the Pulitzer Prize in 1969. Momaday was until his death emeritus professor of English at the University of Arizona.

== History of the Kiowa ==
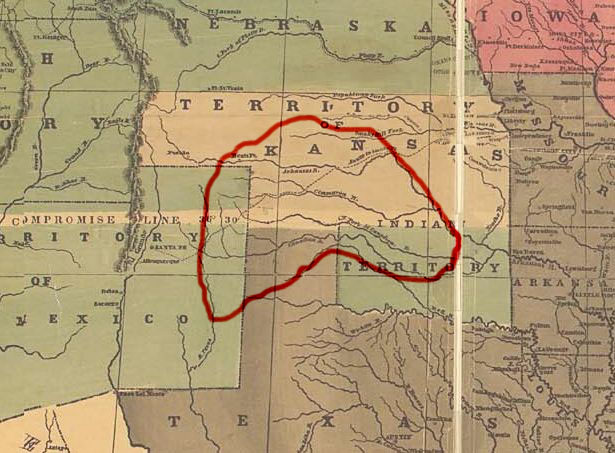
Kiowa land prior to 1850.

The Kiowa tribe has been documented in records dating back to at least 1732. The Kiowa are nomadic people from the Great Plains. They began migrating from western Montana in the 1700s, when they moved southeast of the Yellowstone River. They allied with the Crow tribe, from whom they acquired the horse and the Sun Dance. Their subsequent history is a record of rights lost to the United States government. In 1837, they were forced to sign a treaty with the government that allowed Americans to travel through Kiowa and Comanche lands, and in 1867, the Kiowa were forced onto a reservation as a result of the Medicine Lodge Treaty. Oklahoma became the Kiowa's homeland. In 1990, 9,500 Kiowa still lived in the United States.

== Reception ==
The usefulness of The Way to Rainy Mountain for classroom instruction has been a topic of debate in the academic world. In the article “Inventive Modeling: Rainy Mountain’s Way to Composition,” Kenneth Roemer claims that the book is a perfect example for students learning writing composition because of the three writing approaches that Momaday uses. Roemer also asserts that the book is a good introduction to Native American literature for students with no background in it. The Way to Rainy Mountain raises issues of how to utilize works with unfamiliar subject matter and writing styles in the classroom, Roemer points out. Another critic, Sharon Jessee, claims that The Way to Rainy Mountain can be used to demonstrate theme and plot structure in the classroom.
