= James L. White (poet) =

American poet, editor and teacher (1936 – 1981)

James L. White (March 26, 1936 – July 13, 1981) was an American poet, editor and teacher.

== Biography ==
Born in Indianapolis, Indiana, White attended Indiana University and Colorado State University where he attained an MA in Literary Criticism.

White taught as a poet in the schools on the Navajo Nation and in Minnesota public schools as part of a COMPAS pilot program that brought artists into schools to teach their craft. He also taught with Allen Ginsberg at Naropa University's Jack Kerouac School of Disembodied Poetics.

While teaching, White edited the poetry collections Time of the Indian (1976), which featured the poetry of Indian schoolchildren, and First Skin Around Me (1976), which featured the work of contemporary Indian writers including Joy Harjo and Duane Niatum.

His own books of poetry include the book The Salt Ecstasies, published in 1982 after his death by Graywolf Press.

White died of cardiovascular disease on July 13, 1981, at the age of 45.

== Legacy ==
=== Influence ===
White had an influence on many writers as a mentor and friend. In her book Wild Mind, the author Natalie Goldberg credits White with giving her "permission" to be a poet. Others were influenced by the content of White's poetry. Mark Doty credits White as an early influence on his work and has written poetry in his honor. The poet Carl Phillips has written that White's The Salt Ecstasies was the first book he read that "spoke with disarming honesty about gay desire, desire generally, sex specifically." He credits White's book as a "crucial voice" he encountered as he began as a poet. Poet Brian Teare has cited White as a major influence, revealing that he made a "pilgrimage" to White's Indianapolis grave while in graduate school.

=== James White Review ===
In 1983, a Minneapolis-based gay writers group led by Phil Willkie published the first issue of The James White Review, a literary quarterly of gay men's writing. Initially intended to publish the works of writers native to White's Minneapolis, the group began accepting writing from across the United States and internationally by its second issue. Each issue contained poetry, prose, photography and other artwork centered around the gay male experience. The magazine published in Minneapolis from 1983 until 1999 following its sale to the Washington, D.C.–based Lambda Literary Foundation for $1. The Lambda Literary Foundation continued publication of the magazine to its 1,700 subscribers until 2004.

In 1991, Phil Willkie and Greg Baysans edited and published The Gay Nineties, an anthology of works originally published in the Review.

The White Crane Institute is the current holder of the archives of the review and is considering options for future issues of the review.

=== James White Poetry Prize ===
In the spring of 2008, the White Crane Institute and Phil Willkie announced the establishment of a biennial gay men's poetry prize in honor of White, who was openly gay. The White Crane/James White Poetry Prize is a manuscript prize honoring "excellence in Gay Male Poetry." The judge for the inaugural year of the prize was the poet Mark Doty.

=== Poetry ===
- White, James L.; Doty, Mark (2010) [1982], The Salt Ecstasies: Poems (reprint ed.), Graywolf Press, ISBN 978-1-55597-561-6
- White, James L. (1975), The Del Rio Hotel: new and selected poems, Territorial Press
- White, James L. (1974), A crow's story of deer, Capra Press, ISBN 978-0-88496-016-4
- White, James L. (1972), Divorce proceedings, Dakota Press, ISBN 978-0-88249-012-0
