= Ceremony (Silko novel) =

Novel by Leslie Marmon Silko

- First edition
- Author: Leslie Marmon Silko
- Language: English
- Genre: Grail Quest
- Published: March 1977 Viking Press
- Publication place: United States
- Media type: Print
- Pages: 262
- ISBN: 0-14-008683-8
- OCLC: 12554441
- Followed by: Storyteller (1981)

Ceremony is a novel by Leslie Marmon Silko, a writer of Laguna Pueblo descent. It was published by Viking Press in 1977. The title Ceremony is based on the oral traditions and ceremonial practices of the Navajo and Pueblo people. The book helped secure Silko a MacArthur “genius” grant in 1981.

== Plot ==
Ceremony follows Tayo, a half-Pueblo, half-white veteran, after his return from World War II, where he was stationed in the Pacific. He returns with P.T.S.D., tormented by the knowledge that the United States government used him and other Native men for its war, giving those lucky enough to survive nothing in return.

His white doctors diagnose him with "battle fatigue," today known as post-traumatic stress disorder. In addition to Tayo's story in the present, the novel flashes back to his experiences before and during the war. A parallel story narrates a legendary episode in which the Pueblo nation is threatened by a drought as punishment for listening to a practitioner of "witchery". In order to redeem the people of the nation, Hummingbird and Green Bottle Fly must journey to the Fourth World to find Reed Woman.

Tayo struggles with the death of his cousin Rocky, who died during the Bataan Death March, and with the loss of his uncle Josiah, who died while Tayo was at war. After several years at a military hospital, Tayo is released by his doctors who believe he will do better at home. While staying with his family, Tayo can barely get out of bed and self-medicates with alcohol. He drinks with his fellow veterans—Harley, Leroy, Pinkie, and Emo. They discuss their resentment from fighting in a white man's war with nothing to show for it. It is revealed that Tayo once stabbed Emo with a broken bottle because Emo was bragging about taking the teeth of a slain Japanese soldier.

Meanwhile, the Laguna Pueblo reservation suffers from a drought, an event which mirrors the legend. Looking to help Tayo, his grandmother summons a medicine man named Ku'oosh. However, Ku'oosh's ceremony is ineffective against Tayo's battle fatigue because Ku'oosh can't understand modern warfare. He sends Tayo to another medicine man named Betonie, who incorporates elements of the modern world into his ceremonies. Betonie tells Tayo about the Destroyers who are bent on destabilizing the world, saying that Tayo must complete the ceremony to save the Pueblo people.

Believing himself to be responsible for the drought, Tayo sets out to keep a promise he made to Josiah to round up Josiah's stolen cattle. While riding south after the cattle, he meets a woman named Ts'eh, whom he sleeps with for a night. He eventually finds the cattle on the property of a wealthy white rancher. Tayo cuts through the ranch fence but is discovered by the ranch's employees. The tracks of a huge cougar, heavily implied to be a form of Ts'eh, distract them. Tayo escapes. Ts'eh and her brother help Tayo trap the cattle in an arroyo so he can drive them back to the pueblo.

The next year, Tayo reunites with Ts'eh, and spends an idyllic time with her until Tayo's drinking buddies return for him. After a night of drinking, Tayo realizes he cannot complete the ceremony while drunk and abandons the others after sabotaging their truck. Later that night, Emo tortures Harley near the site of the Trinity nuclear test, trying to lure Tayo out to settle their score. In contrast to their past confrontation, Tayo decides not to fight. A fight ensues among the other men that results in the deaths of Harley and Leroy.

Tayo goes back home to the pueblo and tells the elders he has completed the ceremony by recovering the cattle, abstaining from violence, and meeting a spirit woman in the form of Ts'eh. Meanwhile, in the mythic parallel story, Hummingbird and Green Bottle Fly find Reed Woman in the Fourth World. In each storyline, the act of ceremonial reunion brings an end to the drought, and the Pueblo are saved. Emo is banned from the reservation after killing Pinkie, and Tayo lives a content life tending to his herd of cattle.

== Characters ==
- Tayo, World War II veteran of Laguna Pueblo and Anglo descent
- Betonie, mixed-blooded Navajo healer
- Ku'oosh, Laguna kiva priest
- Uncle Josiah, confidant to Tayo who died while Tayo was deployed
- Ts'eh, a highly spiritual woman whom Tayo loves
- Rocky, Tayo's cousin; died during the Bataan Death March
- Harley, friend to Tayo and fellow World War II veteran
- Old Grandma, family matriarch and believer in the Pueblo religion
- Auntie, Rocky's mother who also raised Tayo; Catholic convert who rejects the Pueblo religion
- Laura, known primarily as "Little Sister"; Tayo's mother and sister to Auntie
- Uncle Robert, Auntie's husband
- Emo, Tayo's fellow veteran with a grudge against him
- Pinkie, veteran and follower of Emo
- The Night Swan, girlfriend of Uncle Josiah whom Tayo later sleeps with
- Ulibarri, cousin of the Night Swan from whom Josiah purchases the cattle
- Helen Jean, a native woman who spends time with Harley and Leroy

== Timelines ==
Peter G. Beidler and Robert M. Nelson of the University of Richmond argue that the novel is composed of six timelines:

1. The main timeline
2. Tayo and Rocky's boyhood
3. Tayo and Rocky's early manhood
4. Tayo and Rocky's enlistment and deployment in WWII
5. Tayo's return to the pueblo
6. The mythic action of Spider Woman, Hummingbird, Green Bottle Fly, and Reed Woman, as well as the witchery and the Destroyers

=== Main Timeline ===
- C. 1922: Tayo is born.
- 1941: Tayo and Rocky enlist and are sent overseas. Harley, Emo, and Leroy are at Wake Island. Josiah dies on the pueblo. Tayo and Rocky are taken prisoner
- April–May 1942: Rocky is wounded, and dies during the Bataan Death March; Tayo curses the rain and the flies, and ends up in a POW camp. Drought begins in New Mexico
- July 16, 1945: Trinity Site Test in New Mexico, first atomic bomb test.
- 1945–1948: Tayo is in veteran's hospital mental ward; Tayo is sent home and begins adventures in Dixie bar with Harley, Leroy, Pinkie and Emo.
- May 1948: Tayo is lying in bed, sick at his Auntie's house. Harley arrives on a burro and convinces him to go and get a beer. Ceremony with Ku'oosh fails.
- Late July 1948: Tayo says he is better, but the old men believe that he needs a stronger ceremony, so they refer him to Betonie. Tayo leaves for a while and meets Harley, Leroy and Helen Jean, who go as far away as San Fidel. He wakes up in the morning and vomits, and finally sees the horrible truth about his friends' drunkenness.
- Late September 1948: Tayo goes to Mt. Taylor on his ceremony, trying to retrieve the spotted cattle. He meets Ts'eh, sleeps with her, cuts the fence and retrieves the cattle from the white rancher, meets the hunter, and brings the cattle home.
- Winter 1948–1949 Tayo lives with Auntie, Grandma, and Robert before going back to the ranch to look after the cattle
- Summer 1949: Tayo meets Ts'eh, they pick flowers and herbs, Tayo gets a yellow bull to breed with his cattle, and Ts'eh warns him that "they" will be coming for him at the end of the summer.
- Late September 1949: During the fall equinox, Tayo gets drunk with Harley and Leroy before coming to his senses and disabling their truck. He and Emo have their final confrontation near Jackpile Uranium mine and Trinity Site, and opts not to stab Emo with the screwdriver, letting him kill Harley and Leroy. The next day, Tayo tells Ku'oosh and the elders in a kiva at old Laguna everything that he has seen.

=== Mythical Timeline ===
- Creation: Ts'its'tsi'nako (Thought Woman or Spider Woman) and her daughter/sisters Nau'ts'ity'i (Corn Woman) and I'cts'ity'i (Reed Woman) set life in motion
- Recovery/Transformation: The Keresan prayer for sunrise (Keres is a Native American language, spoken by the Keres Pueblo people in New Mexico)
- Departure: Corn Woman scolds Reed Woman for being lazy, and she departs; Drought begins
- Departure and Recovery: Pa'caya'nyi introduces Ck'o'yo medicine, and the People forget their obligation to Nau'ts'ity'i

== Symbols and themes ==
=== Storytelling ===
The book stretches the novel form, incorporating poetry and oral traditions. Part of the novel is written in prose, and other parts appear as poetry.

There are no conventional chapters in Ceremony. The novel weaves together a number of different timelines and stories.

For the Laguna oral tradition, which author Silko invokes in this book, words hold a deep importance. The Laguna people believe that humans are responsible for telling stories, because words do not exist alone– they need a story to give them meaning. Through storytelling, myths are handed down to teach the history of the Laguna people and their way of life. These stories connect the past and the present, because when myths are retold, those stories become a part of the present.

In the novel, Betonie and Tayo's grandmother tell various stories, fulfilling this responsibility. The significance and power of words are emphasized when Tayo curses the rain, which causes a drought.

Whatever the character Spiderwoman, a mystical creature who creates the world, speaks, or names, comes into existence. This further emphasizes the power of words and thoughts.

=== Ceremony and healing ===
The purpose of ceremonies is the transformation of someone from one condition to another, in Tayo's case, the transformation from diseased to healing. Ceremonies are ritual enactments of myths which incorporate the art of storytelling and the myths and rituals of the Native Americans (70). They are important for Tayo's identity construction as one can see through his mental development after his experience with Betonie and the ceremony (144).

In the novel, "healing" means the recovery of the self and the return to the roots (45) and one important part of the process of healing is rejecting witchery (54). Tayo is stuck in between multiple worlds: between Laguna culture and white culture, and between witchery which is seen as a force opposite to creativity. Tayo rejects witchery when he refuses to drink alcohol his friends offer him (144). He does not only refuse to drink alcohol, he also distances himself from his old friends and a life full of violence. The search for the Laguna culture and its rituals also helps him to deal with turning away from witchery (54). He respects the rituals of his culture by being open for the ceremonies which is another important aspect for his healing (54). Tayo is being taught spirituality by Betonie, this way he internalizes the Laguna culture (133). It is important that the Laguna community, e.g. his aunt, who tells Tayo to go to Betonie, helps Tayo with his healing, because that way Tayo can overcome the alienation he feels caused by him being half-breed. Betonie also helps Tayo to recover through ceremonies which relates Tayo's American identity to his Laguna identity and therefore combines his past with his present (150). The fact that Tayo learns more about and experiences ceremonies is another important aspect which leads him to healing, because he learns about his culture.

The appreciation of the Laguna culture is essential for his healing. He still needs a spiritual ceremony after the white man's medicine, which indicates that he needs to experience his old and his new culture (53). When Tayo covers the deer's dead body at the deer-hunting, which is a gesture performed out of respect, he shows that he initiated Laguna myths, because Laguna mythology connects all living creatures (48). Through his connection with his lover, Ts'eh, Tayo is able to move forward in his healing, not only in body, but also in his spirit as he connects to the divine feminine within himself. After all of these experiences Tayo's dreams no longer haunt him, because he learns to deal with his past and he is able to link the American to the Laguna culture (151). The cattle function as spirit guides, which leads him to healing (374), because through them he learns to forgive himself for the drought (376).

Throughout the novel Silko delves into the complexities of being caught between multiple world views and cultures. She focuses on the importance of blending the cultures, showing how Tayo can only regain health when he chooses how to identify, and by creating his own world that bridges the gap. Through Ceremony Silko invites the reader to take a look at the witchery within everyone, and points out the steps one can take to create healing and wholeness.

=== Native/Ethnic identity ===
The identity of the protagonist Tayo is influenced by his ethnicity. Tayo is described as “half-breed” because, in contrast to his mother, who is a Native American woman, his father is white and does not belong to the Laguna community. His father left the family and Tayo and his mother were supported by his aunt and her husband. The Laguna community in which he has grown up segregates him and he experiences despair for not being fully Native American (71). That he is not trained or educated in the Laguna way of life supports this fact (71). Therefore, Tayo struggles between white and Native American culture and he feels like not belonging to any culture at all. The Laguna people believe that every place, object, landscape or animal relates to stories of their ancestors (2). To develop this cultural identity it is important to take care of the land and the animals. By taking care of the cattle Tayo begins to take a more active and creative role in relations to nature and to his people which supports development of his cultural identity (248). On top of that the cattle function as a symbol for being alienated and different, because they are a mix of different breeds, as well. This is described as positive because the “half-breed” cattle are, like Tayo, strong, robust, and can survive hard times. Therefore, they can be seen as a leitmotif for surviving (367).

Moreover, the city of Gallup represents the struggle of American and Native identity. As being a former Native American city, which was built on Native American territory, Gallup changed into a city that relies on the “Indian” tourism industry. The white Americans suppress the real presence of Native Americans and push them to the borders of the city (491). The Native Americans who lived in the city of Gallup and felt related to the land were pushed back to a specific zoning place under the bridge to divide them from the white civilization (265). They use the former image of the city to attract tourists and make profit. Now only ethnically mixed outcasts live there (265). As Tayo states: “I saw Navajos in torn jackets, standing outside the bar. There were Zunis and Hopis there, too, even a few Lagunas.” (98).

=== Military service and trauma ===
Serving in the war as an American soldier also enhances Tayo's identity struggle. When he was in the war, he represented the United States, but by returning to his hometown he feels invisible as an American and drifts in time and space (132). By laying down the uniform of an American soldier, Tayo, and also the other Native American veterans, are not recognized as Americans anymore. This is underlined by the funeral of Tayo's friends Harley and Leroy. Tayo and his friends struggle to shape their identity between two different sorts of signifying realms, one the "official" American identity (signified by the flag) and the other, that of the erased Native American (signified by the corpse) (490). Furthermore, he has a trauma from war and feels responsible for the death of his cousin Rocky. This trauma often keep him from sleeping long, if at all, with memories from his time in the war and time spent with Rocky coming to haunt him.

The physical effect of Tayo's traumatic experiences manifests itself as intense nausea and vomiting, which native literary critic Jude Todd sees as directly related to Pueblo mythology that stories are held in the belly, thus by vomiting, Tayo is purging himself of the oppressive lies told to him over the course of his life. While it is only through the completion of native healing ceremony laid out by Old Betonie, as pointed out by critic Susan Blumenthal, that Tayo is able to overcome both the trauma of war and the trauma of colonization.

Tayo's personal trauma accrued in the war has been identified by several literary critics as being analogous to the collective trauma suffered by indigenous people affected by internalized colonialism. Literary critic Joanne Freed suggests that the use of traumatic experience is central to the power of the narrative as it allows non-native readers to better identify with the native protagonist by effectively sharing Tayo's war trauma, thereby opening up the reader to the experienced by Tayo as an indigenous person.

Throughout the book, Tayo deals with various forms of trauma caused by his military service. Used as a literary device, this trauma allows readers to have a closer look at the violence and cruelty of history. Silko uses trauma and prejudice to tell her story, and it brings a lot of the ugliness of humanity to light. Tayo's trauma also serves as a story telling medium. The reader learns about his past through these flashes of memory, and it allows for a deeper experience within the story. Tayo's trauma manifests in visual reproductions, causing him to relive the same horrible experiences over and over again. Upon his return home, Tayo reacts to his survivor's guilt, as many have before him, through alcohol use. The white doctors can't help him, and the Natives can't either until he meets Betonie. This healer helps Tayo get through his dark thoughts and even turns it around so that Tayo plans to become a native healer as well.

Hybridity

A major theme of Ceremony focuses on the struggles that stem from the mixed-race heritage of Tayo. Tayo is a half-white half-Pueblo Laguna Native American man who grapples with his identity after he returns home from WWII. As he comes to terms with tragic events he faced during the war, he must also navigate his assimilation back into society as a Native American man. Hybridity is also encountered in the landscapes of the novel. After serving in the tropical wet Philippine Islands during the war, Tayo returns home to find the Pueblo people in a drought. Tayo had cursed the rain as a soldier, but returns to find his home in need of it. Other themes involving hybridity include the loss of land and a forced assimilation into society. Tayo and his family must interact with the land in ways that are forced on them by a history of colonization while trying to maintaining their cultural traditions.

Hybridity is something that Tayo struggles with heavily over the course of the novel. Constantly at war with the two sides of his heritage, Tayo has to figure out how to be both white and Laguna without losing the other part of himself.

=== Matriarchal culture ===
In Ceremony and in the Laguna culture, a matriarchal society, there is a matriarchal hierarchy. The rules of matrilineal descent dictate that a bride continue to live with or near her mother, and not her husband's family, even after the bride's marriage (matrilocal residence/matrilocality). The husband must then move into his wife's - and mother-in-law's household, and resulting children belong to the clan of their mother (not their father). Because Laura, Tayo's mother and Auntie's sister is dead, care of young Tayo is relinquished to Laura's sister and mother, Auntie and Grandma, and Auntie is then obligated to raise Tayo as her own. In matriarchal societies and in Ceremony, if you are a woman, and older than the rest of the women in your family, you have the final say in every aspect of the family's life. In Ceremony, Grandma and Auntie have some struggles on what should be done about Tayo's illness, but in the end it is always Grandma who decides. Grandma suggests to Auntie that a medicine man is needed to heal Tayo. Although Auntie is reluctant, she agrees, and the medicine man comes and tries to help Tayo heal from his shell shock. In fact, there are multiple examples of Auntie and Old Grandma not agreeing on the right course of action throughout the novel. Though it is not stated explicitly, ultimately the way Old Grandma felt it should be handled is always how it ends up. Including when Tayo wanted to go off to war. Though Auntie was fine with Rocky going, there was an understanding that Tayo was meant to stay and help around the farm. In the end, Old Grandma told Auntie to let him go, and he went.

Night Swan is another significant female character in Ceremony, who represents both sexual agency and maternal teachings as a part of Tayo's journey to healing. She is introduced as Uncle Josiah's archetypal mistress lover at first, but also briefly becomes Tayo's lover and introduction to women as sexual beings. All the same, Tayo refers to Night Swan as naiya, or mother. Another clear example in Ceremony of this matriarchal culture or hierarchy is when Tayo's uncle, Josiah, saves money of his own for 25 years to buy his herd of cattle, at Night Swan's urging. This example makes it clear that the women of the family have control of the money, evidenced by the fact that Auntie makes a certain comment to her brother Josiah about how he is wasting his 25 year's worth of money ($500) on the herd.

Along with this representation of matriarchy in the Laguna culture, the poems, creation stories, and healing stories throughout the novel all center around a woman or woman figure including Spider woman, Reed woman, and Corn woman. It is argued that this matriarchal representation is due to the Laguna people attributing the existence of life itself, as well as the agency of its inhabitants, to knowledge and the spoken word, which are in turn attributed to divine female beings in creation stories, such as the Spider Woman mentioned in Silko's novel. Even the first word of the entire novel is “Ts'its’tsi’nako” which is the name for Thought-Woman who is attributed in Laguna culture for the creation of the universe.

Later on in the novel, Tayo also has a lover called Ts'eh, who like the Night Swan, is meant to encapsulate the divinity of nature and female creationism in some aspect, while also assisting Tayo along his journey.

Traditionally, in the Laguna culture, the men are the agriculturists and feed their family and communities, and the women own the land and houses and pass them down to their daughters. Silko shows more examples of the matriarchal hierarchy when she is describing the character Robert, Auntie's husband. Robert lives in Old Grandma's house with Auntie and is always describes as being quiet while the women of the house discuss the important issues. Silko even gives insight into Robert's mindset during arguments in one passage, “... he was patient with them because he had nothing to say. The sheep, the house, and the fields- everything belonged to them, including the good family name.” It is described that although the Laguna peoples are matriarchal, they have a very collaborative community effort to keep their culture and peoples alive.

=== Agency of animals ===
The intelligence of animals, and the character's beliefs around that topic, is an ongoing theme during the course of Ceremony. To give some background, most Indigenous peoples have mythical figures that take the form of humanoid animals, including characters like Coyote . Native Americans believe that current animals are descendants of these figures, and are capable of thought and rational choice. All animals are examined through the compassionate lens of Tayo, juxtaposed by his counterparts such as Harley and Emo. Tayo continually ponders the intent and actions of the animals around him, while other characters view them as being stupid or unfeeling objects. Below are some examples from Ceremony in which Tayo tangles with the concept of non-human agency.

On Tayo and Harley's 25 mile long burro ride “going up the line” to the nearest bar, Harley spends much of the trip “cussing out his burro”, while Tayo notes how intelligent it is of the burro to know when Harley is asleep, and how it manages to subtly change course as so it can graze during the bulk of the trip. This is an example of Tayo's heightened sensitivity and respect towards animals and their priorities as individuals.

In Native American culture, the Spider-woman has been noted to be one of the most foundational figures. She is the creator of the universe and often attributed to bringing wisdom and social values to her peoples. Her presence in Tayo's personal healing process is instrumental, as he is a male deeply affected by an imbalanced state of masculinity due to the pressure of returning as the “Macho war hero” archetype when he is in fact struggling to fathom what the fundamentals of heroism even are. The Spider-woman is there to give Tayo the opportunity to nurture himself and to create an internal maternal relationship with himself in which he is able to nurture and cultivate a reborn, balanced and healthy being out of the ashes of his trauma.

As Tayo is trying to navigate Floyd Lee's land, he locks eyes with the mountain lion. The mountain lion walks away, leaving pawprints in the ground. Tayo sprinkles yellow pollen into the pawprints to honor the mountain lion, and then finds his way. Mountain lions represent skills associated with hunting to Laguna Pueblo people. The assumption here is that because Tayo respects the mountain lion, they help him on his journey. There is some debate as to if the mountain lion has a human counterpart. Some people, like Edith Swan, believe the hunter Tayo encounters after leaving Lee's land is the mountain lion. Some believe the mountain lion is Ts’eh. Both interpretations make sense, as they are thought to be mountain spirits because of the symbolism that surrounds them in Ceremony.

When Tayo and Rocky are hunting, Tayo covers the dead deer's head with his jacket. This, rubbing cornmeal on the deer's nose, and other traditions are done to respect the animal's spirit. The Laguna Pueblo people believe if the spirit is not respected, future deer will not choose to die on their reservation.

Cattle are a reoccurring symbol in Ceremony, though critics have disagreed over what this symbol represents. In a collection of essays titled American Indian Fiction, Charles Larson argued that the cattle represent the future of Tayo's people. Larson identifies that Tayo's loss of the cattle is a reflection of his belief that he had severed his connection to his people. "Animals and Human Development in the Contemporary American Indian Novel," a critical study by Peter G. Beidler concluded that the cattle represented a guide for Tayo. Susan Blumenthal discusses both of these interpretations, as well as her own in "Spotted Cattle and Deer: Spirit Guides and Symbols of Endurance and Healing in "Ceremony."' Blumenthal states that the spotted cattle are a hybridization of Native and Western culture. The cattle are a mix of the Mexican Breed and the Hereford which makes the cattle more suited to survive, representing the advantages of cultural hybridization. Silko consistently uses metaphors to compare the cattle to deer or antelope, marking a spiritual hybridization as well, as deer and deer spirits represent freedom and wildness in Laguna culture. This hybridization is reflected in other themes throughout the novel, including the adaptive nature of Native cultures, Tayo's ethnicity and culture, and the mixed ceremonial or healing practices.

== Development ==
Silko began early work on Ceremony while living in Ketchikan, Alaska, in 1973 after moving there with her children, Robert and Kazimir, from Chinle, Arizona. The family relocated so her then-husband, John Silko, could assume a position in the Ketchikan legal services office.

Silko held a contract with Viking Press to produce a collection of short stories or a novel under editor Richard Seaver. Having no interest in creating a novel, Silko began work on a short story set in the American Southwest revolving around the character Harley and the comical exploits of his alcoholism. During this early work, the character Tayo appeared as a minor character suffering from "battle fatigue" upon his return from World War II. The character fascinated Silko enough to remake the story with Tayo as the narrative's protagonist. She used the character of Tayo to reflect her state of being at the time as well as to explore the enigma of those she knew who returned from war. The papers from this early work are held at the Yale University library. Silko stated she dealt with bouts of depression due to the change in climate causing her to get little sunlight. She also had trouble writing due to being busy with household chores that needed to be done.

In February 1974, Silko took a break from writing Ceremony to assume the role of a visiting writer at a middle school in Bethel, Alaska. It was during this time Silko penned the early work on her witchery poetry featured in Ceremony, wherein she asserts that all things European were created by the words of an anonymous Tribal witch. This writing plays a formidable role in the novel's theme of healing. An expanded version of this work is featured in Storyteller.

The poetic works found in Ceremony were inspired by the Laguna oral tradition and the work of poet James Wright, with whom Silko developed a friendship after they met at a writer's conference at Grand Valley State University in June 1974, and years of written correspondence. These letters would be featured in the work The Delicacy and Strength of Lace edited by Ann Wright, wife of James Wright, and published in November 1985 after the poet's death.

Silko completed the manuscript to Ceremony in July 1975 shortly before returning to New Mexico.

Ceremony was published in March, 1977.

== Reception ==
Ceremony has been well received by readers and received significant attention from academics, scholars, and critics. It is widely taught in university courses, as part of American Indian studies, American studies, history, religious studies, and literature courses.

Frank MacShane wrote in The New York Times Book Review that Ceremony ''is one of the most realized works of fiction devoted to Indian life that has been written in this country, and it is a splendid achievement.''

Poet Simon J. Ortiz has lauded Ceremony as a "special and most complete example of affirmation and what it means in terms of Indian resistance."

Denise Cummings, Critical Media & Cultural Studies professor at Rollins College, has described Ceremony as a novel which "immediately challenges readers with a new epistemological orientation while altering previously established understandings of the relationship between reader and text."

Silko received the American Book Award for Ceremony in 1980.

The Encyclopedia Britannica describes Ceremony as "a seminal work of Native literature."

== Influence on Indigenous writers ==
Ceremony is considered to be a key publication in what is known as the Native American Renaissance. This renaissance is a term coined by American literary critic Kenneth Lincoln in his book by the same title and describes the significant increase in fictional literary works published by Native American authors in the United States since the late 1960s. Published in 1977, Silko's Ceremony was influential in providing a historical perspective of the Laguna Pueblo and the consequences of World War II on indigenous people who served in the United States military. Ceremony is thought to be part of the First Wave of contemporary American Indian literature, in which stories contain themes of a return to reservation life and tradition, as well as ceremonies and the rituals of tribal people. Tayo's reconciliation with his heritage and identity fit into those classification, and those themes "serve as exemplars of the desire felt by native people to return to the old ways and to live lives of tribal sovereignty and the exploration and desire for discovery/recovery of identity, both individual and collective." Tayo's return to reservation life is fraught with his struggles with post-traumatic-stress-disorder, as well as his experiences and observations on the modern horrors of poverty and alcoholism that have affected his friends and family. In contrast, Silko shares poems and Laguna creation legends that keep the story grounded in tradition.

In 1994, Silko was awarded a Lifetime Achievement Award from the Native Writers Circle of the Americas.

== Versions and editions ==
Ceremony was published in 1977 by Viking Press as a hardcover first edition.

The dust jacket features a photograph taken by Silko’s father, Lee H. Marmon.

It was reprinted in July 1977 with an updated blurb on the rear flap. Both editions are highly prized by book collectors.

Ceremony was published as a mass market paperback in 1978 by New American Library under its Signet imprint with cover art of the protagonist Tayo in the foreground with an eagle rising behind him.

Penguin issued the novel as a trade paperback in 1986 when Ceremony started to appear in college curricula.

The College Board's Advanced Placement English program soon included Ceremony in its list of recommended works for high school AP literature classes.

In 2006, Penguin re-released Ceremony in a deluxe 30th anniversary edition with a blue cover featuring a single silver feather floating in the center. This edition also featured a new introduction by Larry McMurtry, a Pulitzer Prize winning writer and Academy Award-winning screenwriter, as well as a new preface by the author.
