= Native American Renaissance =

Artistic movement

The Native American Renaissance is a term originally coined by critic Kenneth Lincoln in the 1983 book Native American Renaissance to categorise the significant increase in production of literary works by Native Americans in the United States in the late 1960s and onwards. A. Robert Lee and Alan Velie note that the book's title "quickly gained currency as a term to describe the efflorescence on literary works that followed the publication of N. Scott Momaday's House Made of Dawn in 1968". Momaday's novel garnered critical acclaim, including the Pulitzer Prize for Fiction in 1969.

== Earlier works by Native American authors ==
Prior to the publication of House Made of Dawn, few Native American authors had published works of fiction that reached wide readership. Writers such as William Apess, John Rollin Ridge and Simon Pokagon published works to little fanfare in the nineteenth century. Prior to the onset of World War II, Mourning Dove, John Milton Oskison, John Joseph Mathews, Zitkala-Sa, Charles Eastman and D'Arcy McNickle published literary works, although these works were relatively few in number.

== The Renaissance ==
=== Literary renaissance ===
In the work Native American Literatures: An Introduction, author Suzanne Lundquist suggests the Native American Renaissance has three elements:

- Reclamation of heritage through literary expression;
- Discovery and reevaluation of early texts by Native American authors; and
- Renewed interest in customary tribal artistic expression (i.e. mythology, ceremonialism, ritual, and the oral tradition of narrative transmission).

Lincoln points out that in the late 1960s and early 1970s, a generation of Native Americans were coming of age who were the first of their respective tribal communities to receive a substantial English-language education, particularly outside Indian boarding schools, and with more graduating from colleges and universities. Conditions for Native people, while still very harsh during this period, had moved beyond the survival conditions of the early half of the century.

A period of historical revisionism was underway, as historians were more willing to look at difficulties in the history of the invasion and colonization of the North American continent. As they explored the colonial and "Wild West" eras, some historians were more careful to represent events from the Native American perspective. This work inspired public interest in Native cultures and within Native American communities themselves; it was also a period of activism within Native American communities to achieve greater sovereignty and civil rights.

The ferment also inspired a group of young Native American writers, who emerged in the fields of poetry and novel-writing. In the span of a few years, these writers worked to expand the Native American literary canon.

By the 1980s, the rapid increase in materials and the development of Native American Studies departments and programs at several universities, such as the University of California, Los Angeles; Dartmouth College, and Eastern Washington University, led to the founding of scholarly journals, such as SAIL (Studies in American Indian Literature) and Wíčazo Ša Review (1985). With the heightened interest in Native American writing, publishers established specialized imprints, such as Harper and Row's Native American Publishing Programme, which had the goal of promoting new voices and publication opportunities.

=== Other meanings ===
Although the primary use of the term has been literary, it has been used in a wider sense to describe "an increasing prosperity and sense of achievement among Indians [...] a widespread economic and cultural rebirth." For example, Joan Nagel applies the term to the totality of "the resurgence of American Indian ethnic identification and the renascence of tribal cultures during the 1970s and 1980s."

== Writers ==
Writers typically considered to be part of the Native American Renaissance include:

- N. Scott Momaday (Kiowa), House Made of Dawn (1968)
- Vine Deloria Jr (Standing Rock), Custer Died For Your Sins (1969)
- Duane Niatum (Klallam), Ascending Red Cedar Moon (1974)
- Leslie Marmon Silko (Laguna descent), Ceremony (1977)
- Gerald Vizenor (Chippewa), Darkness in Saint Louis Bearheart (1978)
- James Welch (Blackfeet and A'aninin), Winter in the Blood (1974)
- Joy Harjo (Muscogee Nation), The Last Song (1975)
- Simon J. Ortiz (Acoma), From Sand Creek: Rising In This Heart Which Is Our America (1981)
- Louise Erdrich (Turtle Mountain Band Chippewa), Love Medicine (1984)
- Paula Gunn Allen (Laguna Pueblo descent), The Woman Who Owned the Shadows (1984)
- Maurice Kenny (self-identified Mohawk descent), Tekonwatonti/Molly Brant (1735–1795): Poems of War (1992)
- nila northSun (Shoshone), A snake in her mouth: poems 1974–96 (1997)
- Lance Henson (Cheyenne), "Keeper of Arrows", (1971)

John Gamber argues that the characteristics of Renaissance writers are as follows: devotion to a sacred landscape; a homing-in plot, often associated with a protagonist's return to the reservation; the treatment of a mixed-blood protagonist's dilemma between two worlds as a central theme. Erika Wurth points out that writers of this period were often concerned with writing for a non-Native audience. Wurth and Gamber both agree that a new phase in Native writing began with the works of writers such as Sherman Alexie, who rejected many of the formal and thematic concerns of Renaissance-era writing.

== Criticism ==
The term Native American Renaissance has been criticized on a number of points. As James Ruppert writes, "Scholars hesitate to use the phrase because it might imply that Native writers were not producing significant work before that time, or that these writers sprang up without longstanding community and tribal roots. Indeed, if this was a rebirth, what was the original birth?" Other critics have described it as "a source of controversy". Rebecca Tillett argues that "while the definition of the recent burgeoning of Native writing as a "renaissance" is highly accurate in its description of the sudden growth in the numbers of Native writers finding publication, it is also profoundly inaccurate in its tendency to obscure the often specifically political histories of Indian oratory and writings upon which many Native writers are drawing."
