= The Man Made of Words: Essays, Stories, Passages =

- Author: N. Scott Momaday
- Language: English
- Genre: Essays; Stories
- Publisher: St Martin's Press
- Publication date: 1997
- Publication place: United States
- Pages: 211
- ISBN: 978-031215581-0

The Man Made of Words: Essays, Stories, Passages, written by N. Scott Momaday and published in 1997, is a collection of stories and essays written over a period of more than 30 years. The selections are grouped into three parts.

The first part, titled "The Man Made of Words," includes ten selections that reflect on, among other subjects, the sacred, written and oral traditions, ancient cave paintings as language, love of the land and landscape, and the differences between how Native Americans and whites perceive the world, often drawing on examples from his Kiowa heritage.

The second part, "Essays in Place," explores how stories and life take place in place, and his view that the sacred is there, where words and place come together. This topic unfolds through the course of nine selections, with narratives drawn from his Kiowa heritage, Navajo place names, ancient cave paintings, and his visits to spiritual places in Zagorsk, Bavaria, and Granada.

The final part, "The Storyteller and his Art," contains 19 selections, most of which are no more than two pages. These vignettes often include a story from Momaday's past or a story that was related to him, and an insight into the art of storytelling drawn from the telling of that story.

== Reviews ==
The book received numerous positive reviews. For example, Kirkus Reviews wrote, "The best pieces in the book, such as a wonderful essay on Navajo place names, combine this ethic with a profound attention to local knowledge and old ways of knowing; echoing Borges, Momaday proclaims that for him paradise is a library, but also 'a prairie and a plain . . . [and] the place of words in a state of grace.'"

John Motyka wrote in The New York Times, "He writes that it is the 'perilous and compelling' nature of language and storytelling that fascinates him. He celebrates the spoken word, 'an indigenous expression, an utterance that proceeds from the very intelligence of the soil: the oral tradition.'"

Among the reviews in literary and trade journals are comments such as these:

- "A recurrent theme throughout the collection is the decline and loss of the sacred."
- "Its enduring power is the verity of its central message that oral stories shape the identities of persons and yield infinite layers of meanings for those who attend to the possibilities."
- "In this volume, Momaday collects stories and essays written over the past 30 years that focus on language, the land, and the relationship between Native Americans and whites. ... This volume is a good addition to, but not a substitute for, the author's poetry and fiction. Highly recommended for public and academic libraries."
- "In this new collection of essays and articles, the author of the Pulitzer Prize winning novel House Made of Dawn describes the differences between the European written tradition and the oral tradition of Native Americans, muses on the nature of place and, most of all, proves that he is not just a great Native American writer but a great American writer."
- "Momaday's reminiscences of tribal elders, his lively way with a traditional story, his wonder at natural beauty--these are not mere embellishments on the political analysis that he weaves into the essays; rather, they are vital components of Momaday's complex way with words."
- "In this masterful new collection of essays and articles, it is clearer than ever that he is not simply a very good "Indian" writer, but a great American writer."
- "These anecdotes are charming, moving, simple, and profound, in the best sense of those terms."
