= Nila northSun =

American poet and tribal historian

nila northSun
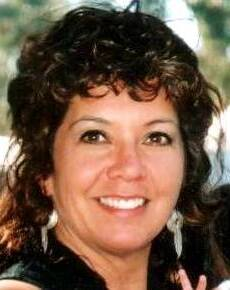
- northSun in 2008
- Born: Cheri Nordwall; 1951 (age 74–75); Schurz, Nevada, US
- Citizenship: United States; Paiute-Shoshone Tribe of the Fallon Reservation and Colony
- Occupation: Poet
- Writing career
- Notable work: A snake in her mouth: poems 1974–96
- Literary movement: Native American Renaissance

nila northSun (born 1951) is a Native American poet and tribal historian.

northSun's gritty, realistic poems about life both on and off the reservation, have made her one of the most widely read of all Native American poets. She is often considered an influential writer in the second wave of the Native American Renaissance.

== Life ==
northSun was born in 1951 in Schurz, Nevada to a Shoshone mother and a Chippewa father, activist Adam Fortunate Eagle. She was given the name Cheri Nordwall at birth. She was raised in the San Francisco Bay Area. She briefly attended the University of California before moving to Missoula, Montana, where she attended and graduated from the University of Montana-Missoula with a bachelor's degree in art. After graduating, northSun moved to the Fallon Paiute-Shoshone Reservation in Nevada.

While at the University of Montana, she met Kirk Robinson (d. 2017), who would be her first husband. The two collaborated on the literary magazine Scree and co-founded Duck Down Press. In 1977, northSun published her first chapbook through Duck Down. That year, she began work on her monograph After the Drying Up of the Water, which she published in 1980. northSun's first three chapbooks received critical praise, but she was unable to republish many of her poems due to sharing copyright with Robinson, whom she had divorced.

In the late 1980s and early 1990s, northSun worked at Stepping Stones, a Reno-based outreach organization and emergency shelter for Native American youth. Her experiences there, as well as the inspiration found during her daily one-hundred-mile round-trip commutes, sparked a return to poetry. In 1992, she met Sherman Alexie at the Returning the Gift Festival at the University of Oklahoma, who offered to help northSun compile and publish a new poetry collection. Her 1997 poetry collection, A Snake in Her Mouth, returned northSun to the public eye.

In 1992, northSun was appointed to the Nevada State Women's Council, and in 2000 she was appointed to the Nevada State Art Council.

== Style ==
northSun uses colloquial "Reservation English," irony, and humor to explore themes of alienation, disenfranchisement, anger, loss, and brutalization.

== Personal life ==
She lives on the Fallon Paiute-Shoshone Reservation in Fallon, Nevada and works as a grant writer for the Reno-Sparks Indian Colony. She has two sons with former husband Kirk Robinson.

== Recognition and honors ==
In 2000, the "Friends of the Library" group at the University of Nevada honored her with the Silver Pen Award for outstanding literary achievement. Governor Kenny Guinn appointed her to the Nevada State Arts Council that same year.

In 2004, she received the "Indigenous Heritage Award in Literature" from ATAYL, an international agency and is the recipient of a Sierra Arts Foundation Literary Award.

== Selected works ==
=== Poetry ===
- whipped cream and sushi (2008)
- love at gunpoint: poems. R. L. Crow Publications. 2007. ISBN 978-0-9722958-4-0.
- A Snake in Her Mouth: poems 1974 - 96 (1st ed.). Albuquerque: West End Press. 1997. ISBN 978-0-931122-87-3.
- Small bones, little eyes: poems. Duck Down Press. 1981. ISBN 9780916918170.; co-written with Jim Sagel
- Coffee, dust devils and old rodeo bulls: poems. 1979.; co-written with first husband Kirk Robertson
- Diet pepsi and nacho cheese: poems. Duck Down Press. 1977.

=== Non-fiction ===
- After the Drying Up of the Water, a tribal history of the Fallon Paiute-Shoshone (1980)

== See also ==
- List of writers from peoples indigenous to the Americas
- Native American Studies
