= Almanac of the Dead =

Novel by Leslie Marmon Silko

- Cover of first edition (hardcover)
- Author: Leslie Marmon Silko
- Language: English
- Genre: Novel
- Publisher: Simon & Schuster
- Publication date: 1991
- Publication place: United States
- Media type: Print (hardback and paperback)
- Pages: 763 pp
- ISBN: 0-671-66608-8
- OCLC: 23942058
- Dewey Decimal: 813/.54 20
- LC Class: PS3569.I44 A79 1991

Almanac of the Dead is the second novel by Leslie Marmon Silko, first published in 1991.

== Overview ==
Almanac of the Dead takes place in the American Southwest and Central America, focusing on the conflict between Anglo-Americans and Native Americans. It follows the stories of dozens of major characters in a non-linear narrative format, switching between the present day, flashbacks, and occasional mythological storytelling.

The novel's numerous characters are often separated by both time and space, and many seemingly have little to do with one another at first. A majority of these characters are involved in criminal or revolutionary organizations; including the Zapatista Army of National Liberation revolutionaries, arms dealers, drug kingpins, an elite assassin, corrupt politicians, and a black market organ dealer.

Driving many of these individual storylines is a general theme of total reclamation of Native American lands, as well as a celebration of the value of storytelling.

Critiquing the limitations of the American Indian Movement, the novel presents readers with the model of "tribal internationalists," individuals who work with international alliances to reclaim their Indigenous land. Several literary critics have been critical of the novel's depiction of homosexuality, as the novel features male gay and bisexual characters who are variously abusive, sadistic, and cruel.

== Plot ==
=== Part One: The United States of America ===
The opening section consists of eight books with smaller chapters totalling 234 pages. In this section, the following characters are introduced: Lecha, Zeta, Seese, Sterling, Yoeme, Calabazas, Ferro, Paulie, David, Eric, Beaufrey, Jamey, Root, Mosca, Mahwala, Sarita, and Liria. These characters contain the core expository elements and conflicts of the opening section. Most of this section takes place in Arizona, New Mexico, and Southern California.

=== Part Two: Mexico ===
This section only has two books: "Reign of Death Eye-Dog" and "Reign of Fire-Eye Macaw", which both consist of interconnected short stories. They total 91 pages. New characters are introduced, namely Menardo, Iliana, Alegria, General J, Green Lee, El Grupo, Bartolomeo, Angelita La Escapia, El Feo, and Tacho. All the events occur in Tuxtla, Chiapas, or in and around Mexico City.

=== Part Three: Africa ===
This section of the novel consists of three books: "New Jersey", "Arizona", and "El Paso", and is 117 pages. In this section, some of the characters from the previous two parts re-appear. Menardo, Alegria, Zeta, and Lecha are mentioned. Others return fully to the center of the narrative. The new characters introduced are Max Blue, Leah, Trigg, Rambo-Roy, Clinton, Sonny Blue, Bingo, Angelo, Marilyn, Peaches, and Judge Arne. Sterling, Ferro, Paulie, Seese, and Jamey are present through the rest of the book.

=== Part Four: The Americas ===
This section takes place in Mexico and Colombia. It is split into two books: "Mountains" and "Rivers," and consists of 100 pages. The stories of this section focus on Menardo, Alegria, El Feo, Tacho, Bartolomeo, and Angelita La Escapia, as well as the minor characters Beaufrey and Serlo.

In "Rivers", the latter two have gone to Colombia with David to make deals, ride horses, sniff coke, and indulge any of their other desires. Beaufrey and Serlo's personal histories are also described, showing them to be narcissists obsessed with the pure blood of their European ancestors. They also wish to make an alternative world away from Black, Native, Asian, or mixed people, as well as white people who they claim to be of lower-class rank and status. It is revealed that Beaufrey is gay, has a fetish for torture videos, and is using David for nothing more than sex and emotional manipulation. Both Beaufrey and Serlo are also revealed to be behind the disappearance of Seese and David's child Monte, and explicitly state how much pleasure they had in watching David and Seese suffer as a result.

=== Part Five: The Fifth World ===
The fifth section of the novel continues to have the various story-lines and plot points converge. At nearly 140 pages, it is the second longest section of the novel. It is made up of three books: "The Foes," "The Warriors," and "The Struggle". In the first book "The Foes", the plot focuses on the trauma experienced by the twin sisters Lech and Zeta. Simultaneously the sisters learn of the triplets La Escapia, El Feo, and Tacho and their resistance efforts. It is revealed that Seese is from Tucson, where she worked as a stripper for Tiny.

Mosca develops an obsession for the Blue family and their businesses in Tucson, while Calabazas is shown to be compassionate, yet losing his edge. Liria and Sarita's work on the border is also described. All these characters' worlds become explicitly connected to Max Blue and his family in "The Warriors" book, due to Mosca's plan that makes Sonny begin a feud with the Tucson police. Judge Arne also features extensively in this section, and is shown to be as powerful as Max Blue and deranged as Serlo or Beaufrey.

The third book, "The Struggle" sees Alegria crossing the Mexico-U.S. border, and a new character is introduced; Awa Gee, who is a close friend of Zeta. Awa Gee is a Korean computer scientist that hacks the U.S. government and develops weapons for the poor. Awa Gee becomes a vital component of Zeta's plan. Ferro's lover Jamey is also introduced.

=== Part Six: One World, Many Tribes ===
This is the shortest section of the novel at 53 pages in length, containing one book called "Prophecy". Two new leaders of the resistance movement named Wilson Weasel Tail and the Barefoot Hopi deliver dramatic and dynamic speeches at a convention attended by mostly young white people. Lecha, Zeta, Awa Gee, Clinton, Rambo-Roy, Angelita (on behalf of the twin brothers), Root, Calabazas, and Mosca all meet and exchange their perspectives and strategies with the two leaders. A rebel cell called the Eco-terrorists also attends the convention. The attendees present various short discussions of their philosophical views. In the end, many characters' narrative arcs are not completed, and other characters are killed off, while others close out the book in unremarkable ways. More importantly, the conclusion reinforces the idea and symbol of an almanac as always updated, but never completed.

== Characters ==
=== Lecha ===
A psychic returning home after years of being away because she is dying of cancer. Lecha “has come home to get things in order before she died.” She is Zeta's twin sister and has the ability to see into people's lives and futures. She exploits this gift for some time in her life, even becoming a TV personality, before she decides to return to the work left by her grandmother. Lecha is also part of Calabazas' organization, and has travelled around the Americas.

=== Zeta ===
Lecha's twin sister. She stayed in Arizona and raised Lecha's son Ferro. Like Lecha, Zeta decides to return to the work left to them by their grandmother. Zeta and Lecha's mother was an indigenous woman from Mexico who was impregnated by a white man. After their mother dies, the twins' father returns for a short period in their lives. Zeta also has ties to Calabazas' organization.

=== Seese ===
A young white woman who was living in San Diego, where she became a drug addict. She falls in love with a bisexual man named David. They have a child, who is later abducted and possibly killed. When Seese sees Lecha on TV, she drives to Tucson to find her.

=== Sterling ===
An older Laguna man from New Mexico who is exiled from his community after he fails to protect them from a Hollywood film crew that disrespects their native lands. He has wandered across the American Southwest since his twenties and loves to read crime histories of early America. He is recruited by two of Calabazas' men while drinking at a bar, and works as a gardener for Lecha, Zeta, and Calabazas.

=== Yoeme ===
Lecha and Zeta's Maya grandmother. She abandoned her family (Lecha and Zeta's mother) when she was young because she knew they were not strong enough to survive the colonial violence of white settlers. Yoeme returns to the twins' life, teaches them harsh lessons and histories of the American Southwest, and hands them a book called The Almanac of the Dead that she wants them to read.

=== Calabazas ===
An old Yaqui Indian who has run a clandestine business and organization between Tucson and Sonora for over 40 years. Lecha was his lover for a short time, and he has a wife named Sarita. For most of his married life, he desired Sarita's younger sister Liria.

=== Ferro ===
Lecha's son. He was overweight and effeminate as a young boy and was teased a lot as well. He also harbors a lot of resentment for his mother and Zeta, as Zeta raised him in the same cold and calculating ways Yoeme raised her. Ferro is gay and has two lovers: one in his recent past named Jamey, and another named Paulie. Ferro also works with the Calabazas.

=== Paulie ===
Works at Zeta and Ferro's homestead, looking after the dogs they own. He was in prison with Ferro and is now his lover.

=== David ===
A bisexual artist from San Diego. He was a former escort before Beaufrey fell for him and took care of him. Beaufrey eventually helps David become a well-known artist. David is at the core of a love triangle involving Seese, Eric, and Beaufrey. David and Seese have a child named Monte, who is kidnapped and killed by a jealous Beaufrey.

=== Eric ===
A young gay man from a conservative family in Texas. He moves to San Diego to live as he wishes, and falls in love with David. Like Seese, Eric becomes a drug addict and becomes hated by Beaufrey.

=== Jamey ===
Ferro's lover who is addicted to cocaine.

=== Root ===
A part white, Mexican, and Indian man. His mother was a German woman who married a dark mestizo man in the Army. Root is Lecha's on-and-off lover and is highly intelligent. He is involved in a serious accident that gives him brain damage and alters his motor functions. Despite his disabilities, Root is one of Calabazas' most trusted transporters.

=== Mosca ===
A dark-skinned Mexican who is also one of Calabazas' transporters. He loves to drink and do drugs. He is also fascinated with Root's accident, which he tries to mythologize.

=== Mahwala ===
The eldest of Calabazas' Yaqui tribe. She shares and communicates the land's and tribe's history to Calabazas.

=== Sarita ===
Calabazas' wife from the Brito family in Sonora. Her father married her to Calabazas to pay a gambling debt, and she is a devout Catholic.

=== Liria ===
Sarita's younger sister. She is said to have been the one to give Calabazas his name as a young girl during one of the early transports between him and their family.

=== Menardo ===
An indigenous Mexican from Chiapas. He is a self-loathing Maya man who tries to conceal any indigenous part of his self and family history. As a youth, he is teased for being fat and dark-skinned. He starts an insurance company that is small until a major earthquake hits, and he pulls off a miraculous feat that makes the community members adore him. He gains many customers, and other opportunities open up for him. Menardo's wealth grows, he marries a woman named Iliana and gains monetary connections from Tucson to Guatemala.

=== Iliana ===
A local from Tuxtla whose family claims to be direct descendants of the colonizer Juan de Oñate. She grows up spoiled, and loves expensive things. Iliana discovers she is infertile after marrying Menardo. and spends most of her time with the other wives of El Grupo. Her family hates Menardo.

=== Alegria ===
A woman from Venezuela that was educated in Spain. She is a white young architect working for a major firm in Mexico City. She is assigned to build Menardo's lavish house for Iliana. She lives with her boyfriend Bartolomeo in Mexico City. Alegria begins an affair with Menardo as she designs and constructs his home, and Iliana suspects nothing.

=== General J ===
From Guatemala and part of Menardo's inner circle. He denies he has ties to any indigenous blood. General J hates communism and is actively strategizing with Menardo to quell rising rebellions within Mexico. He is Menardo's muscle but does not behave as a subordinate to him.

=== Green Lee ===
An arms dealer from Tucson, another of Menardo's connections.

=== El Grupo ===
A group of characters including the Police Chief, The Judge, The Governor, and The Ambassador. Menardo is constantly in communication with them about their money, their wives, and the state of Mexico as a country.

=== Angelita La Escapia ===
An indigenous Maya woman from Mexico City. She is the head of a leftist rebel cell that is tracking Menardo's activities and reporting back to her indigenous community members. Her love of Karl Marx's book Das Kapital makes her suspicious in her community. Her love for Marx is rooted in the idea that he is the only white man who has ever told the truth, through rigorous research and evidence, about the savagery of white people and capitalism. She views Marx through an indigenous lens and constantly speaks of his materialist shortcomings. She is also involved in a relationship with Bartolomeo, though she is plotting against him as well, because he is a white Cuban who also thinks indigenous people are stupid.

=== Bartolomeo ===
A white Cuban who runs a communist organization in Mexico City. He is ordered to sleep with Alegria to get information for his group about Menardo and others.

=== El Feo ===
From the same indigenous community as Angelita La Escapia. He was sent to keep an eye on her, but agrees with the ways she is organizing and moving forward.

=== Tacho ===
Menardo and Iliana's indigenous chauffeur. He deals with Menardo and Iliana's constant micro-aggressions but also helps decipher Menardo's constant surreal and violent dreams. Tacho keeps Macaws in their backyard. He is depicted as observant and calculating, and is tied to the same cells as Angelita, Bartolomeo, and El Feo.

=== Max Blue ===
A Vietnam War veteran known as a mafia figure in New Jersey. During his time in the war, he survived a plane crash, which Max interprets as a good omen. The opening of Part Three has him surviving an assassination attempt that kills his brother Bill. These events change Max, and make him retire from organized crime. He moves his family to Tucson, where he spends all his time playing golf.

=== Leah ===
Max's wife. She works in real estate and constantly cheats on Max because he has no interest in having sex with her. Max knows of Leah's infidelities and does not care. Though she is not fond of Arizona, Leah does manage to hustle and obtain large amounts of valuable property in the area.

=== Trigg ===
A racist, sexist, alcoholic businessman, who lost his ability to walk in a car accident. He becomes Leah's primary lover, and builds a blood and organ bank with the help of his assistant Peaches, as well as a homeless veteran named Roy.

=== Rambo-Roy ===
A Vietnam War veteran. He works for Trigg but uses the money he makes to organize other homeless men, veterans in particular, because he has a vision to build an army to overthrow the government. He does not trust Trigg and has a crush on Peaches.

=== Clinton ===
A Vietnam War veteran, and the first central Black character of the novel. He is homeless like Roy, and they become partners in plotting a resistance. Clinton's focus is on liberating Black Americans from the shackles of American historical, religious, and economic bondage. Outside of Max Blue, Clinton is the most prominent figure of Part Three. He retells how he survived Vietnam, his days in college, the history of Black Indians, and how he looks to centre pre-colonial African spirituality in his daily life.

=== Sonny Blue ===
Max's son, but Leah is not his biological mother. He had inherited a small portion of the family's business running slots and vending machines, but does not feel it is enough for him. Sonny negotiates a gun and drug deal with criminals in Mexico. Sonny is also cruel to Leah and his younger brother, and behaves in an overtly sexist and racist manner.

=== Bingo ===
Max's other son, who is bullied by Sonny. He developed a cocaine addiction after finding out about his father's life and business. Alongside his brother, he manages the slots and vending machines.

=== Angelo ===
Max and Leah's nephew. Angelo's father did not want to be part of the family business, but Angelo does. He begins to work with his cousins Sonny and Bingo, but Bingo does not trust the woman Angelo is in love with. Angelo also believes Sonny is money-hungry and untrustworthy.

=== Marilyn ===
The woman Angelo is in love with. She also seems to have strong feelings for him, but chooses to go back to be with her husband.

=== Peaches ===
Trigg's assistant. She knows all of his secrets and hints at them to Roy. Peaches is smart and calculating.

=== Judge Arne ===
Caught up in a small scandal tied to Ferro's lover Jamey. He is not worried about it though, because Arne has found someone else on who he can place stronger blame on. Judge Arne also plays golf with Max Blue.

== Publication history ==
The print edition of Almanac of the Dead features a "Five Hundred Year Map," omitted in the e-book versions of the novel.

The map depicts Silko's stylized version of the locations featured in the novel, with lines radiating outward from Tucson, Arizona to New Jersey in the northeast, San Diego in the west, and Tuxtla Gutiérrez in the Mexican state of Chiapas in the south. Other cities and towns in the US and Mexico are accompanied by character names and notes that pertain to both the novel's narrative and historical events. Almanac of the Dead's linked narratives largely unfold within this mapped space, although events also take place in or reference previous events in other places (including Colombia and Argentina). The map names Alaska, Cuba, and Haiti as part of a graphic representation centered on Tucson. The map is described as solely a map of Mexico, with no mention of the United States of America and without showing contemporary state or national borders.

In an interview, Silko stated that she "drew that map in Almanac as a 'glyphic' representation of the narrative. This 'glyph' shows how the Americas are 'one,' not separated by artificial, imaginary 'borders.' The landscapes, the spirits of the places are known by the narratives that originate in these places."

== Reception ==
While Kirkus Reviews praised the novel calling it a "dense and occasionally dazzling saga," Publishers Weekly took a different approach writing "this meandering blend of mystical folklore, thriller-type violence and futuristic prophecy is unwieldy, unconvincing and largely unappealing."
