= Duane Niatum =

American poet

- Born: Duane McGinniss; 1938 (age 87–88); Seattle, Washington
- Citizenship: United States
- Education: BA University of Washington; MA Johns Hopkins University; PhD University of Michigan
- Occupations: Writer, teacher
- Writing career
- Genres: Poetry, fiction, plays

Duane Niatum (McGinniss) is a Native American poet, author and playwright from the Jamestown S'Klallam Tribe in the northern Olympic Peninsula of the state of Washington. Niatum's work draws inspiration from all aspects of life ranging from nature, art, Native American history and humans rights. Niatum is often cited as belonging to the second wave of what critic Kenneth Lincoln has termed the Native American Renaissance.

== Early life and education ==
Born in 1938 in Seattle, Washington to a Klallam (Salish) mother and Italian-American father, Niatum struggled with his mixed Indigenous and Italian heritage which would trouble him for years. After his parents' divorce when Niatum was four years old, Niatum's Klallam grandfather became his surrogate father, which would leave a lasting impression as he would pass on the Klallam tribe's oral tradition which would later become intertwined into his writing.

At the age of 17, Niatum enlisted in the United States Navy, which sent him to Japan. After his military service, Niatum studied with the poets Theodore Roethke and Elizabeth Bishop at the University of Washington, where he earned his B.A. in English. He went on to earn an M.A. at Johns Hopkins University and a Ph.D. from the University of Michigan, where he studied American culture. His dissertation focused on the life and art of the Aleut sculptor John Hoover.

== Career ==
Niatum established himself as one of the most influential promoters of Native American poetry when he served as editor of a Native American author series at Harper & Row Publishers, where he edited two influential anthologies: Carriers of the Dream Wheel: Contemporary Native American Poetry (1975) and Harper's Anthology of 20th Century Native American Poetry (1988). He has published numerous essays on Native American literature, and his own poetry has been translated into more than a dozen languages.

Niatum has said his greatest influences include his Klallam grandfather and literary mentors Theodore Roethke, Elizabeth Bishop, and John Keats.

In the preface to his 2000 book The Crooked Beak of Love, Niatum described the impact of his mixed ancestry on his life and work: "My aesthetic position has always been to learn and grow from whatever sources of knowledge are available...Art continues to offer the opportunity of surviving in both worlds no matter how challenging that may become at times." He also explained his grandfather's influence on his writing: "My grandfather's life and stories became the touchstones of my life and art. The center of my artistic self starts from his home and his parents' home which was almost on the beach."

Niatum has taught at Seattle-area high schools as well as colleges and universities including The Evergreen State College, the University of Washington, Pacific Lutheran University, Western Washington University, and the University of Michigan.

=== Books ===
- Earth Vowels Mongrel Empire, 2017.
- The Pull of the Green Kite Seattle, WA: Serif & Pixel Press, 2011
- Agate Songs on the Path of Red Cedar: Poems Sequim, WA : Jamestown S'Klallam Tribe, c2011
- Journeys That Criss-cross Darkness and Light: Poems [Tacoma, WA] : D. Niatum, [2004?]
- Nesting Out for Stars, and Other Stories [Bellingham, WA : D. Niatum, 2002
- The crooked beak of love Albuquerque, N.M.: West End Press (2000) ISBN 0-931122-96-1
- Stories from the land of red cedar Seattle (1999)
- Learning to Live With Darkness Like the Crows [Seattle: D. Niatum, 1994?]
- Drawings of the Song Animals: New and Selected Poems. Duluth, Minnesota: Holy Cow! Press (1991) ISBN 0-930100-43-3
- Harper's Anthology of Twentieth-Century Native American Poetry San Francisco: Harper & Row (1988)
- Stories of the Moons Marvin, SD: Blue Cloud Quarterly Press (1987)
- Raven and the Fear of Growing White Amsterdam, Holland: Bridge Press (1983)
- Pieces New York: Strawberry Press (1981)
- Songs for the Harvester of Dreams Seattle, WA: University of Washington Press (1981) ISBN 0-295-95758-1
- To Bridge the Dream Laguna, NM: A Press (1978)
- Digging out the roots: poems New York: Harper & Row (1977) ISBN 0-06-451155-3
- Turning to the Rhythms of Her Song Seattle, WA: Jawbone Press (1977)
- Carriers of the Dream Wheel: Contemporary Native American Poetry. Harper & Row (1975) ISBN 978-0-06-451151-3
- A Cycle for the Woman in the Field. Laughing Man Press (1973)
- Ascending Red Cedar Moon, New York: Harper & Row (1973) ISBN 0-06-451150-2
- Taos Pueblo and Other Poems. Greenfield Center, NY: Greenfield Review Press (1973) ISBN 0-912678-08-9
- After the Death of an Elder Klallam Phoenix, AZ: Baleen Press (1970) ISBN 0-912074-00-0
- Breathless Seattle, WA: University of Washington (1968)

=== Essays ===
- Brian Swann; Arnold Krupat, eds. (2005). I tell you now: autobiographical essays by Native American writers. University of Nebraska Press. ISBN 978-0-8032-9314-4.

=== Anthologies ===
- Jim Elledge; Susan Swartwout, eds. (1999). Real things: an anthology of popular culture in American poetry. Indiana University Press. p. 221. ISBN 978-0-253-33434-3. "Duane Niatum."
- Andrea Lerner, ed. (1990). Dancing on the rim of the world: an anthology of contemporary Northwest native American writing. Sun Tracks. ISBN 978-0-8165-1215-7.

== Awards and honors ==
Niatum has been nominated for a Pushcart Prize four times, been awarded residencies at Yaddo and Millay Colony for the Arts, and received grants from the Carnegie Fund for Authors and the PEN Fund for Writers.

He has also received the following awards:

- American Book Award (1982)
- First Prize - Poetry. Pacific Northwest Writers Conference. (1966), (1970)
- Poetry in Motion Grant Award
- Nelson Bentley Award, Department of English, University of Washington (1982)
- Lifetime Achievement Award from the Native Writers Circle of the Americas (2017)
