= Leslie Marmon Silko =

American writer

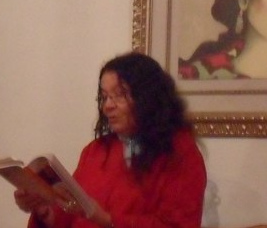
- Silko at a 2011 reading
- Born: Leslie Marmon; March 5, 1948 (age 78); Albuquerque, New Mexico
- Education: University of New Mexico
- Occupations: Writer; educator; film maker
- Writing career
- Genre: Fiction
- Notable works: Ceremony (1977); Storyteller (1981); Almanac of the Dead (1991)
- Movement: Native American Renaissance

Leslie Marmon Silko (born Leslie Marmon; born March 5, 1948) is an American writer. A woman of Laguna Pueblo descent, she is one of the key figures in the First Wave of what literary critic Kenneth Lincoln has called the Native American Renaissance.

Silko was a debut recipient of the MacArthur Foundation Grant in 1981, the Native Writers' Circle of the Americas Lifetime Achievement Award in 1994 and the Robert Kirsch Award in 2020. She currently resides in Tucson, Arizona.

== Early life ==
Leslie Marmon Silko was born in Albuquerque, New Mexico to Leland Howard Marmon, a noted photographer, and Mary Virginia Leslie, a teacher, and grew up on the Laguna Pueblo reservation. Her mixed-race family was of white American, Native American, and Mexican descent. She wrote that her paternal grandmother, who was born in Montana, had a father whose family was "part Plains Indian" but that her grandmother "never knew" which tribe she was descended from, and that her grandmother's father was "half German" with an "Indian" mother. She also wrote that her maternal grandmother was part Cherokee "through her Grandfather Wood" who was from Kentucky.

Silko grew up on the edge of Laguna Pueblo society both literally – her family's house was at the edge of the Laguna Pueblo reservation – but was not able to participate in some of the rituals because of the distance of their home. Her father's Laguna blood quantum was one-quarter and hers is one-eighth; the Laguna Pueblo blood quantum requirement for regular membership is one-quarter. She is not an enrolled citizen of the Laguna Pueblo. Calling herself a "mixed-breed," she had said that a sense of community is more important to Native identity than blood quantum: "That's where a person's identity has to come from, not from racial blood quantum levels." She has described her Marmon family history as "very controversial, even now." She is of Laguna descent through her great-grandfather, a Laguna woman named Maria Anaya/Analla, who was married to a white settler named Robert Gunn Marmon. According to Silko, the core theme of her writing is an attempt to make sense of what it means to be "neither white nor fully traditionally Indian." She identifies culturally as a Laguna woman, but does not claim to be representative of Native voices.

While her parents worked, Silko and her two sisters were cared for by their grandmother, Lillie Stagner, and great-grandmother, Helen Romero, both story-tellers. Silko learned much of the traditional stories of the Laguna people from her grandmother, whom she called A'mooh, her aunt Susie, and her grandfather Hank during her early years. As a result, Silko has always identified most strongly with her Laguna heritage, stating in an interview with Alan Velie, "I am of mixed-breed ancestry, but what I know is Laguna."

Silko's education included preschool through the fifth grade at Laguna BIA (Bureau of Indian Affairs) School and followed by a Catholic school, the latter meant a day's drive by her father of 100 miles to avoid the boarding-school experience. Silko went on to receive a BA in English Literature from the University of New Mexico in 1969; she briefly attended the University of New Mexico law school before pursuing her literary career full-time.

== Early literary work ==
Silko garnered early literary acclaim for her short story "The Man to Send Rain Clouds," which was awarded a National Endowment for the Humanities Discovery Grant. The story continues to be included in anthologies.

During the years 1968 to 1974, Silko wrote and published many short stories and poems that were featured in her Laguna Woman (1974).

Her other publications, include: Laguna Woman: Poems (1974), Ceremony (1977), Storyteller (1981), and, with the poet James A. Wright, With the Delicacy and Strength of Lace: Letters Between Leslie Marmon Silko and James Wright (1985). Almanac of the Dead, a novel, appeared in 1991, and a collection of essays, Yellow Woman and a Beauty of the Spirit: Essays on Native American Life Today, was published in 1996.

Silko wrote a screenplay based on the comic book Honkytonk Sue, in collaboration with novelist Larry McMurtry, which has not been produced.

== Literary relevance and themes ==
Throughout her career as a writer and teacher, she has remained grounded in the history-filled landscape of the Laguna Pueblo. Her experiences in the culture have fueled an interest to preserve cultural traditions and understand the impact of the past on contemporary life. A well-known novelist and poet, Silko's career has been characterized by making people aware of ingrained racism and white cultural imperialism, and a commitment to support women's issues. Her novels have many characters who attempt what some perceive a simple yet uneasy return to balance Native American traditions survivalism with the violence of modern America. The clash of civilizations is a continuing theme in the modern Southwest and of the difficult search for balance that the region's inhabitants encounter.

Her literary contributions are particularly important because they open up the Anglo-European prevailing definitions of the American literary tradition to accommodate the often underrepresented traditions, priorities, and ideas about identity that in a general way characterize many American Indian cultures and in a more specific way form the bedrock of Silko's Laguna heritage and experience.

During an interview in Germany in 1995, Silko shared the significance of her writings as a continuation of an existing oral tradition within the Laguna people. She specified that her works are not re-interpretations of old legends, but carry the same important messages as when they were told hundreds of years ago. Silko explains that the Laguna view on the passage of time is responsible for this condition, stating, “The Pueblo people and the Indigenous people of the Americas see time as round, not as a long linear string. If time is round, if time is an ocean, then something that happened 500 years ago may be quite immediate and real, whereas something inconsequential that happened an hour ago could be far away.”

== Ceremony ==
Leslie Marmon Silko's novel Ceremony was first published by Penguin in March 1977 to much critical acclaim.

The novel tells the story of Tayo, a wounded returning World War II veteran of mixed Laguna-white ancestry following a short stint at a Los Angeles VA hospital. He is returning to the poverty-stricken Laguna reservation, continuing to suffer from "battle fatigue" (shell-shock), and is haunted by memories of his cousin Rocky who died in the conflict during the Bataan Death March of 1942. His initial escape from pain leads him to alcoholism, but his Old Grandma and mixed-blood Navajo medicine-man Betonie help him through Native ceremonies to develop a greater understanding of the world and his place as a Laguna man.

Ceremony has been called a Grail fiction, wherein the hero overcomes a series of challenges to reach a specified goal; but this point of view has been criticized as Eurocentric, since it involves a Native American contextualizing backdrop, and not one based on European-American myths. Silko's writing skill in the novel is deeply rooted in the use of storytelling that pass on traditions and understanding from the old to the new. Fellow Pueblo poet Paula Gunn Allen criticized the book on this account, saying that Silko was divulging secret tribal knowledge reserved for the tribe, not outsiders.

Ceremony gained immediate and long-term acceptance when returning Vietnam War veterans took to the novel's theme of coping, healing and reconciliation between races and people that share the trauma of military actions. It was largely on the strength of this work that critic Alan Velie named Silko one of his Four Native American Literary Masters, along with N. Scott Momaday, Gerald Vizenor and James Welch.

Ceremony remains a literary work featured on college and university syllabi, and one of the few individual works by any author of Native American heritage to have received book-length critical inquiry.

== 1980s ==
=== Storyteller ===
In 1981, Silko released Storyteller, a collection of poems and short stories that incorporated creative writing, mythology, and autobiography, which garnered favorable reception as it followed in much the same poetic form as the novel Ceremony.

=== Delicacy and Strength of Lace ===
In 1986, Delicacy and Strength of Lace was released. The book is a collected volume of correspondence between Silko and her friend James Wright whom she met following the publication of Ceremony. The work was edited by Wright's wife, Ann Wright, and released after Wright's death in March 1980.

== 1990s ==
=== Almanac of the Dead ===
The novel Almanac of the Dead was published in 1991. This work took Silko ten years to complete and received mixed reviews. The vision of the book stretches over both American continents and includes the Zapatista Army of National Liberation revolutionaries, based in the southern Mexican state of Chiapas, as just one group among a pantheon of characters. The theme of the novel, like that of Ceremony, focuses on the conflict between Anglo-Americans and Native Americans.

Several literary critics have been critical of the novel's depiction of homosexuality, based on the fact that the novel features male gay and bisexual characters who are variously abusive, sadistic, and cruel. Almanac of the Dead has not achieved the same mainstream success as its predecessor.

=== Sacred Water ===
In June 1993, Silko published a limited run of Sacred Water under Flood Plain Press, a self-printing venture by Silko. Each copy of Sacred Water is handmade by Silko using her personal typewriter combining written text set next to poignant photographs taken by the author.

Sacred Water is composed of autobiographical prose, poetry and pueblo mythology focusing on the importance and centrality of water to life.

Silko issued a second printing of Sacred Water in 1994 in order to make the work more accessible to students and academics although it was limited. This edition used printing methods suited for a greater production distribution.

=== Yellow Woman and a Beauty of the Spirit: Essays on Native American Life Today ===
Yellow Woman and a Beauty of the Spirit: Essays on Native American Life Today was published by Simon & Schuster in March 1997.

The work is a collection of essays on various topics; including an autobiographical essay of her childhood at Laguna Pueblo and the racism she faced as a mixed blood person; stark criticism directed at President Bill Clinton regarding his immigration policies; and praise for the development of and lamentation for the loss of the Aztec and Maya codices, along with commentary on Pueblo mythology.

As one reviewer notes, Silko's essays "encompass traditional storytelling, discussions of the power of words to the Pueblo, reminiscences on photography, frightening tales of the U.S. border patrol, historical explanations of the Mayan codices, and socio-political commentary on the relationship of the U.S. government to various nations, including the Pueblo."

The essay "Yellow Woman" concerns a young woman who becomes romantically and emotionally involved with her kidnapper, despite having a husband and children. The story is related to the traditional Laguna legend/myth of the Yellow Woman.

=== Rain ===
In 1997, Silko ran a limited number of handmade books through Flood Plain Press. Like Sacred Water, Rain was again a combination of short autobiographical prose and poetry inset with her photographs.

The short volume focused on the importance of rain to personal and spiritual survival in the Southwest.

=== Gardens In The Dunes ===
Gardens in the Dunes was published in 1999. The work weaves together themes of feminism, slavery, conquest and botany, while following the story of a young girl named Indigo from the fictional "Sand Lizard People" in the Arizona Territory and her European travels as a summer companion to an affluent White woman named Hattie.

The story is set against the back drop of the enforcement of Indian boarding schools, the California Gold Rush and the rise of the Ghost Dance Religion.

== 2000s ==
=== The Turquoise Ledge: A Memoir ===
In 2010, Silko released The Turquoise Ledge: A Memoir. Written using distinctive prose and overall structure influenced by Native American storytelling traditions, the book is a broad-ranging exploration not only of her Laguna Pueblo, Cherokee, Mexican and European family history but also of the natural world, suffering, insight, environmentalism and the sacred. The desert southwest setting is prominent. Although non-fiction, the stylized presentation is reminiscent of creative fiction.

== Essays ==
A longtime commentator on Native American affairs, Silko has published many non-fictional articles on Native American affairs and literature.

Silko's two most famous essays are outspoken attacks on fellow writers. In "An Old-Fashioned Indian Attack in Two Parts," first published in Geary Hobson's collection The Remembered Earth (1978), Silko accused Gary Snyder of profiting from Native American culture, particularly in his collection Turtle Island, the name and theme of which was taken from Pueblo mythology.

In 1986, Silko published a review entitled "Here's an Odd Artifact for the Fairy-Tale Shelf," on Anishinaabe writer Louise Erdrich's novel The Beet Queen. Silko claimed Erdrich had abandoned writing about the Native American struggle for sovereignty in exchange for writing "self-referential," postmodern fiction.

In 2012, the textbook, Rethinking Columbus, which includes an essay by her, was banned by the Tucson Unified School District following a statewide ban on Ethnic and Cultural Studies.

== Personal life ==
In 1965, she married Richard C. Chapman, and together, they had a son, Robert Chapman, before divorcing in 1969.

In 1971, she and John Silko were married. They had a son, Casimir Silko. This marriage also ended in divorce.

== Bibliography ==
=== Novels ===
- Ceremony. 1977. / reprint. San Val, Incorporated. 1986. ISBN 978-0-613-03297-1.
- Almanac of the Dead. 1991. / reprint. Penguin. 1991. ISBN 978-0140173192.
- Gardens in the Dunes. Simon and Schuster. 2000. ISBN 978-0-684-86332-0.

=== Poetry and short story collections ===
- Laguna Women: Poems (1974)
- Western Stories (1980)
- Storyteller. Henry Holt & Company. 1981. ISBN 978-0-8050-0192-1.
- Sacred Water: Narratives and Pictures. Flood Plain Press. 1994. ISBN 978-0-9636554-0-0.
- Rain (1996)
- Love poem and Slim Canyon (1996)
- Oceanstory (2011) Published as a Kindle Single and available for digital download on Amazon.com

=== Other works ===
- The Turquoise Ledge: A Memoir (2010)
- Ellen L. Arnold, ed. (2000). Conversations with Leslie Marmon Silko. University Press of Mississippi. ISBN 978-1-57806-301-7.
- Yellow Woman and a Beauty of the Spirit: Essays on Native American Life Today. Simon and Schuster. 1997. ISBN 978-0-684-82707-0. "Leslie Marmon Silko."
- Melody Graulich, ed. (1993). Yellow woman. Rutgers University Press. ISBN 978-0-8135-2005-6.
- Delicacy And Strength of Lace Letters (1986)
- "Indian Song: Survival", Chicago Review, Vol. 24, No. 4 (Spring, 1973), pp. 94–96

== See also ==
- List of writers from peoples Indigenous to the Americas
- Native American Studies
