= N. Scott Momaday =

Native American author and academic (1934–2024)

- Ts’òâitàlyì
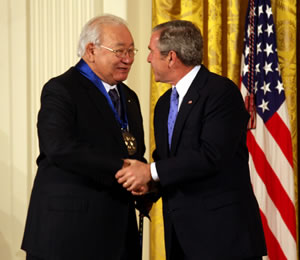
- Momaday receiving the National Medal of Arts from George W. Bush, 2007
- Born: Novarro Scotte Mammedaty; February 27, 1934; Lawton, Oklahoma, U.S.
- Died: January 24, 2024 (aged 89); Santa Fe, New Mexico, U.S.
- Education: University of New Mexico (BA); Stanford University (MA, PhD)
- Occupation: Writer
- Writing career
- Genre: Fiction
- Notable work: House Made of Dawn (1968)
- Movement: Native American Renaissance

Navarre Scott Momaday (February 27, 1934 – January 24, 2024) was a Kiowa and American novelist, short story writer, essayist, and poet. His novel House Made of Dawn was awarded the Pulitzer Prize for Fiction in 1969, and is considered the first major work of the Native American Renaissance.

In a tribute published upon his death, Joy Harjo (Mvskoke), 23rd Poet Laureate of the United States, noted that in House Made of Dawn, "Momaday found a way to move eloquently between oral storytelling forms and the written English novel form. The trajectory of the book moves from sunrise to sunrise, making a circle - a story structure recognizable in Indigenous oral history, yet following traditional American literary shape and expectations of a novel. The title is drawn directly from the traditional literature of the Diné people."

Momaday received the National Medal of Arts in 2007 for his work's celebration and preservation of Indigenous oral and art tradition. He held 20 honorary degrees from colleges and universities, the last of which was from the California Institute of the Arts in 2023, and was a fellow of the American Academy of Arts and Sciences.

== Background ==
Navarre Scotte Momaday, also written Novarro Scotte Mammedaty. was born on February 27, 1934, in Lawton, Oklahoma. He was delivered in the Kiowa and Comanche Indian Hospital, registered as having seven-eighths Indian blood. N. Scott Momaday's mother was Mayme 'Natachee' Scott Momaday (1913–1996), who Momaday stated was to be of English, Irish, French, and "some degree of Cherokee" descent, born in Fairview, Kentucky, while his father was Alfred Morris Momaday, who was a full-blooded Kiowa. His mother was a writer and his father a painter. His grandfather John spelled the name Mammeday. In addition, the etymology of Momaday appears in John Peabody Harringon's Vocabulary of the Kiowa language, Washington: U.S. Government Printing Office, 1928, as an unambiguous entry on page 121: mῌm-dei ‘up, upper; roof’. Harrington used a small-capital Greek eta H to represent the sound of “ǎ” in land /lænd/ and iotacized it (subscript iota, as a right-turning curl) to represent that nasalized vowel: [æ˜], thus [mæ˜m-dei], corresponding to “original” Mammeday and then Momaday.

As an infant, Momaday was taken to Devils Tower and given the Kiowa name Tsoai-talee (Rock-Tree Boy). In 1935, when N. Scott Momaday was one year old, his family moved to Arizona, where both his father and mother became teachers on a reservation. In 1946, a 12-year-old Momaday moved to Jemez Pueblo, New Mexico, living there with his parents until his senior year of high school. Growing up in Arizona and New Mexico allowed Momaday to experience not only his father's Kiowa traditions but also those of other Southwest Native Americans including the Navajo, Apache, and Pueblo traditions.

To challenge himself, Momaday spent his final year of high school at the Augusta Military Academy in Virginia. He then enrolled at the University of Virginia, where he met William Faulkner and John Dos Passos. Momaday subsequently transferred to the University of New Mexico, graduating in 1958 with a Bachelor of Arts degree in English. He continued his education at Stanford University where, in 1963, he earned a Ph.D. in English literature.

In a 2022 interview for the PBS show American Masters, the director Jeff Palmer asked Momaday what knowledge would he want to pass on to younger generations. He responded: "I would want them to be mindful of that fact that at the beginning of the 20th Century say, I was born in a house in Oklahoma, which had no electricity, no plumbing. We would be considered at the very bottom of the scale in terms of land and poverty. I came from that by the virtue of good luck and perseverance into a kind of existence that has been visible.

"I have achieved a kind of reputation and I think the legacy has to do with what is possible. It is possible to overcome great disadvantage. You know the Indian people, at the turn of the 20th Century, were terribly defeated. They had a sense of defeat. They had been conquered and put down and held down. And it was terribly hard for them to come out of that, to survive that kind of poverty of the morale, let’s say. But they have done it to a large extent. There’s still a ways to go. I want my legacy to be the example of how one can survive against those odds. I think it gets easier all the time..."

== Literary career ==
After receiving his Ph.D. in 1963 from Stanford University, Momaday's first book publication was The Complete Poems of Frederick Goddard Tuckerman, which he edited and prefaced with an introduction. Momaday's doctoral dissertation was on Tuckerman.

His novel House Made of Dawn led to the breakthrough of Native American literature into the American mainstream after the novel was awarded the Pulitzer Prize for Fiction in 1969.

House Made of Dawn was the first novel of the Native American Renaissance, a term coined by literary critic Kenneth Lincoln in the Native American Renaissance. The novel is a seminal work of contemporary Native American literature. His follow-up work The Way to Rainy Mountain blended folklore with memoir.

As other Indigenous American writers began to gain recognition, Momaday turned to poetry, releasing a small collection called Angle of Geese. Writing for The Southern Review, John Finlay described it as Momaday's best work, and that it should "earn him a permanent place in our literature." The Gourd Dancer, which was finished while Momaday taught in the USSR, was released in 1976.

According to Matthias Schubnell, Momaday's memoir The Names "is best described as an extension of The Way to Rainy Mountain: while the earlier work conveys the mythic and historical precedents to Momaday's personal experiences in story fragments within an associative structure, The Names is a chronological account of his childhood and adolescence."

== Academic career ==
Momaday was tenured at Stanford University, the University of Arizona, the University of California-Berkeley, and the University of California-Santa Barbara. Momaday was a visiting professor at places such as Columbia and Princeton, while also being the first professor to teach American Literature in Moscow, Russia at Moscow State University.

In 1963, Momaday began teaching at the University of California–Santa Barbara as an assistant professor of English. From 1966 to 1967, he focused primarily on literary research, leading him to pursue the Guggenheim Fellowship at Harvard University. Two years later, in 1969, Momaday was named professor of English at the University of California-Berkeley. Momaday taught creative writing, and produced a new curriculum based on American Indian literature and mythology. In 1981, he settled at the University of Arizona in Tucson, where he retired in 2005.

During the 35-plus years of Momaday's academic career, he built up a reputation specializing in American Indian oral history and sacred concepts of the culture itself. Momaday's contributions to the field resulted in 21 honorary degrees from universities including Yale, the University of Massachusetts, the University of Wisconsin, Dartmouth and Oklahoma City University.

Momaday was a visiting professor at the University of New Mexico during the 2014–15 academic year to teach in the Creative Writing and American Literary Studies Programs in the Department of English. Specializing in poetry and the Native oral tradition, he taught The Native American Oral Tradition.

== Awards and recognition ==
In 1969, Momaday won the Pulitzer Prize for his novel House Made of Dawn.

In 1992, Momaday received the first Lifetime Achievement Award from the Native Writers' Circle of the Americas.

In 1993, Momaday received the Golden Plate Award of the American Academy of Achievement.

Momaday was featured in the Ken Burns and Stephen Ives documentary, The West (1996). He was also featured in PBS documentaries concerning boarding schools, Billy the Kid, and the Battle of the Little Bighorn.

In 2000, Momaday received the St. Louis Literary Award from the Saint Louis University Library Associates.

In July 2007, Momaday was honored as the Oklahoma Centennial Poet Laureate Later that year, in November, he was awarded the National Medal of Arts by President George W. Bush.

Momaday received an honorary Doctor of Humane Letters from the University of Illinois at Chicago on May 9, 2010.

In 2018, Momaday won a Lifetime Achievement Award from the Anisfield-Wolf Book Awards, the only juried prize to honor the best books addressing racism and questions of equity and diversity. The same year, Momaday became one of the inductees in the first induction ceremony held by the National Native American Hall of Fame.

In 2019, Momaday was awarded the Ken Burns American Heritage Prize.

In 2019 Momaday received the Richard C. Holbrooke Distinguished Achievement Award of the Dayton Literary Peace Prize.

Momaday appeared in the 2023 Ken Burns documentary The American Buffalo.

== Later activities ==
In 2007, Momaday returned to live in Oklahoma for the first time since his childhood. Though initially he moved back to Oklahoma for his wife's cancer treatment, Momaday's relocation coincided with the state's centennial, and Governor Brad Henry appointed him as the 16th Oklahoma Poet Laureate, succeeding Nimrod International Journal editor Francine Leffler Ringold. Momaday held the position for two years.

Momaday was the founder of the Rainy Mountain Foundation and Buffalo Trust, a nonprofit organization working to preserve Native American cultures. Momaday, a known watercolor painter, designed and illustrated the book, In the Bear's House.

== Death ==
He died on January 24, 2024, at the age of 89 at his home in Santa Fe, New Mexico.

== Selected bibliography ==
=== Nonfiction ===
- The Journey of Tai-me (1967), folklore & memoir, ISBN 9780826348210, OL 23935855M revised and published as The Way to Rainy Mountain (1969) (illustrated by his father, Alfred Momaday), folklore & memoir; ISBN 9780826304360
- The Names: A Memoir (1976), memoir

=== Long Fiction ===
- House Made of Dawn (1968), novel
- The Ancient Child (1989), novel

=== Poetry ===
- Angle of Geese (1974), poetry chapbook
- The Gourd Dancer (1976), poetry
- Again the Far Morning: New and Selected Poems (2011), poetry
- The Death of Sitting Bear (2020), poetry
- Earth Keeper: Reflections on the American Land (2020), poetry
- Dream Drawings: Configurations of a Timeless Kind (2022), poetry, ISBN 9780063218123, OL 35857827M

=== Drama ===
- The Indolent Boys (Play) Premiered on the Syracuse Stage during the 1993–94 season.
- Three Plays: The Indolent Boys, Children of the Sun, and The Moon in Two Windows (2007), plays

=== Children's literature ===
- Circle of Wonder: A Native American Christmas Story (1994), children's book
- Four Arrows & Magpie: A Kiowa Story (2006), children's book

=== Miscellaneous ===
- In the Presence of the Sun (1992), stories and poetry
- The Native Americans: Indian County (1993)
- The Man Made of Words: Essays, Stories, Passages (1997), stories and essays
- In the Bear's House (1999), mixed media

== See also ==
- Poet Laureate of Oklahoma
- List of writers from peoples Indigenous to the Americas
- Native American Renaissance
- Native American studies
