= Lee Marmon =

American photographer (1925–2021)

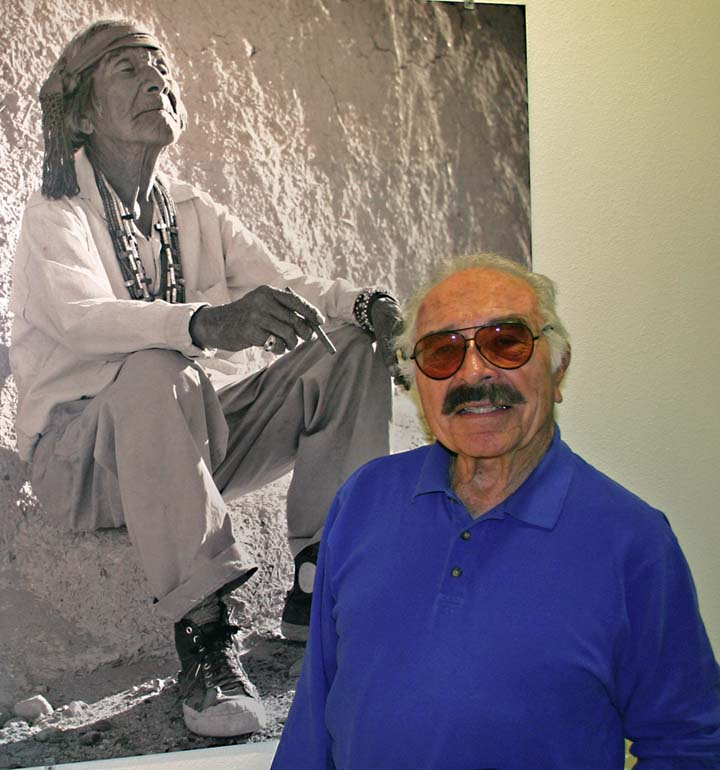
- Lee Marmon standing next to an enlarged image of his signature photograph, "White Man's Moccasins" at the Indian Pueblo Cultural Center in Albuquerque, New Mexico
- Born: September 20, 1925; Laguna Pueblo, New Mexico, U.S.
- Died: March 31, 2021 (aged 95)
- Known for: Photography
- Notable work: "White Man's Moccasins"

Leland Howard Marmon (September 20, 1925 – March 31, 2021) was a Native American photographer and author. Marmon is known for his black-and-white portraits of tribal elders.

Marmon's works have appeared in galleries, books, and magazines, including The New York Times, The Saturday Evening Post, and Time. His works were also featured in the Peabody Award-winning PBS series, "Surviving Columbus". A collection of Marmon's best-known works are featured in his award-winning 2004 book, "The Pueblo Imagination", which he wrote in collaboration with poets Joy Harjo and Simon Ortiz, and his oldest daughter, novelist Leslie Marmon Silko.

== Biography ==
Marmon's blood quantum was one-quarter Laguna, but his one-eighth Laguna children did not meet the blood quantum requirements of the Laguna Pueblo. Lee Marmon was born into circumstances that made him uniquely positioned among beings to create this great visual tapestry. The thousands of photographs he has taken are the product of the rare confluence of Lee's ethnic identity, generational positioning, artistic talent, technological vision, and his own cultural awareness.

Marmon took his first photograph in 1936 at age 11, of a motor vehicle accident on the old U.S. Route 66 in Laguna. However, it was 11 years later when Marmon began to embrace photography on a professional level.

Lee Marmon's photography career began as a youthful, creative pursuit in 1947, shortly after he returned home to New Mexico from his World War II tour of duty in the US Army on remote Shemya Island in the far western Aleutians. His father, Henry Marmon, put a professional quality Speed Graphic camera in 22-year-old Lee's hands, and suggested that he take photographs of the tribal elders, "so we'll have something to remember them by." Photography lessons were scarce on the high desert in the 1940s but it was a practice that young Lee embraced with commitment and enthusiasm. While delivering groceries across the pueblo in his 1930 Model A, young Lee would come across the pueblo's elder members sunning themselves on the tribal plaza. Despite their lack of familiarity with a camera, most were happy to oblige Lee's requests for a pose.

Marmon's most famous portrait is "White Man's Moccasins" (1954), which has become his signature photograph. In that image, tribal elder Jeff Sousea, the old caretaker, about 85, of the Laguna mission, is sitting in the afternoon sun sporting a traditional headband, traditional beaded necklaces, and a well-worn pair of Keds brand high-top sneakers on his feet. This curious juxtaposition of both traditional tribal and western wear in "White Man's Moccasins" has come to symbolize the great cultural transition that Marmon's works documented on the pueblos in the mid 20th century, as ancient tribal traditions and practices gradually gave way to more modern, western-oriented practices.

Marmon's varied and notable career has extended beyond photography. He ran the Marmon Trading Post with his father, Henry "Hank" Marmon, from 1949 to 1966. Lee Marmon's wife, Virginia, served as the Laguna Postmaster from 1950 to 1956. The Marmon family have had a presence in New Mexico since about 1868, after the Civil War. Brothers Walter and Robert Marmon married Laguna women and settled there. Robert's son "Hank", born in 1895, was Lee's father. Lee Marmon's daughter, Leslie Marmon Silko, is a well-known author.

From 1966 to 1982, Marmon lived and worked in southern California, where he served as the official photographer for the Bob Hope Desert Classic Golf Tournament from 1967 to 1973. He returned to live at Laguna Pueblo in 1982.

In 1972, Marmon was commissioned by then President and Mrs. Richard Nixon for a White House photo collection of tribal pottery from New Mexico.

In May and June 2006, a collection of Marmon's best-known images was on display at the Oliver Wendell Holmes Library on the campus of Phillips Academy in Andover, Massachusetts.

In June, 2006, Marmon was the recipient of the Lifetime Achievement Award from the Santa Fe–based Southwestern Association for Indian Arts for the "legacy of integrity" his works have inspired during the 59 years that Marmon has been practicing his craft.

Marmon died in March 2021 at the age of 95.
