= The Heirs of Columbus =

1991 novel by Gerald Vizenor

- Cover of the 2014 Wesleyan University Press edition
- Author: Gerald Vizenor
- Language: English
- Publication date: 1991

The Heirs of Columbus is a 1991 novel by Gerald Vizenor that, in the face of the 500th anniversary of Christopher Columbus' arrival in America, inverts the historical record by re-imagining Columbus as a descendant of Mayans and Sephardic Jews who now wants to return home, that is, to America. Meanwhile, his modern-day descendants, the heirs of the title, are trying to bring his bones home. Critic Louis Owens considers this novel to be Vizenor "[i]n his best trickster-satirist mode" as he accomplishes "a brilliant appropriation of the master symbol of Euroamerican history".

== Plot ==
The concept behind the novel is that the Mayans were the first civilization in the world and that they had taken their civilization to Europe during the time of Antiquity. Columbus was a descendant of the Mayans through his secret Sephardic Jewish ancestry, and his ancestral memories called him to return to the ancestral homelands in America. During his first landing in the Americas, he was visited by a Native American healer named Samana, who took him to bed and became pregnant by him. The heirs of the title are the present-day (1990s) descendants of Samana and Columbus.

The plot of the novel involves the attempts by the heirs to bring home and re-bury two sets of remains: Columbus's and Pocahontas's. The retrieval of Columbus's remains is accomplished through a heist designed by Felipa Flowers, the heir who repatriates Native American remains from museums, and is carried out with the help of a young shaman named Transom. The rescue of Columbus's remains allows the heirs not just to verify their genetic link to Columbus, but to isolate the genetic code for scientific purposes; employing genetic scientists from around the world, the heirs create the Dorado Genome Pavilion, a medical center dedicated to healing tribal youth. The second retrieval, that of the remains of Pocahontas, results in the death of Filipa Flowers and is revealed to be a plot by the original "owner" of the Columbus remains, Doric Michéd, to regain custody. Important subplots include court hearings regarding tribal sovereignty and the ownership of sacred items, political intrigue against the heirs by both U.S. and tribal politicians, and spiritual conflict with the Wendigo.

The novel is also centered on two locations created by the heirs. The first, the Santa María Casino, a barge for gambling anchored in Lake of the Woods, a lake that sits on the border of the United States and Canada and that separates the Northwest Angle exclave, held mostly by the Red Lake Indian Reservation, from the rest of Canada. Within the novel, the Casino and its neighboring ships—the restaurant Niña and the tax-free market Pinta—are declared by a federal judge to be a sovereign tribal territory, "the first maritime reservations in international waters". After the Casino is destroyed in a storm, the heirs move west and form a new nation, named Point Assinika, at Point Roberts, Washington, a location that, like the Northwest Angle, is an exclave, belonging to the United States but situated on the tip of a Canadian peninsula.

== Analysis ==
The novel employs many of Vizenor's themes and stylistic devices: the use of mixedblood central characters, the use of parody, the deliberate, playful revision of history (as one reviewer describes it, "History jousts with myth", with history coming in "a poor second"), and the emphasis on the healing power of stories. This novel also includes characters from Vizenor's other books, including Bearheart, Griever de Hocus, Nanabozho, Almost Browne, and the Trickster of Liberty, as well as numerous references to such historical figures as Louis Riel and Black Elk and to figures from contemporary Native American literary culture, including Arnold Krupat, N. Scott Momaday, Leslie Marmon Silko, Louise Erdrich, Thomas King, and James Welch.
