= A Good Day to Die =

A good day to die is an expression of unclear historical origin signifying bravery.

A Good Day to Die, It Is a Good Day to Die, or Today Is a Good Day to Die may also refer to:

== Music ==
- A Good Day to Die (album),by Absinthe
- "Good Day to Die", a song by Godsmack from The Oracle
- "Good Day to Die", a song by Hot Hot Heat from Happiness Ltd.
- "Today Is a Good Day to Die", a song by Manowar from Louder Than Hell
- "It Is a Good Day to Die", a song by Robbie Robertson from Music for The Native Americans
- "Good Day to Die", a song by Travis from Good Feeling
- "A Good Day to Die", a song by Venom from Metal Black
- "Good Day to Die", a song by Wednesday 13 from Fang Bang
- "It's a Good Day to Die", a song from Starship Troopers 3: Marauder
- "Good Day to Die", a song by Exodus from Force of Habit

== Other uses ==
- "A Good Day to Die" (episode), a 2007 episode of Robin Hood
- A Good Day to Die (film), a 2010 American documentary film about American Indian Movement activist Dennis Banks
- Children of the Dust (miniseries) or A Good Day to Die, a 1995 television miniseries starring Sidney Poitier
- A Good Day to Die, a novel by Jim Harrison
- A Good Day to Die, a novel by Simon Kernick

== See also ==
- Crazy Horse (c. 1840–1877), Lakota leader to whom the quotation is often inaccurately attributed
- "A Fine Day to Die", a song by Bathory from Blood Fire Death
- A Good Day to Die Hard, a 2013 film starring Bruce Willis
- Life: Today Is a Very Good Day to Die, an album by Kra
- Little Big Man (film), a 1970 film notably featuring the line
- Not a Good Day to Die, a book by Sean Naylor
