= Jamake Highwater =

American writer and journalist (1931–2001)

- Born: Jackie Marks; February 13, 1931; Los Angeles, California, US
- Died: June 3, 2001 (aged 70); Los Angeles, California, US
- Occupation: Writer
- Awards: Newbery Honor

Jamake Mamake Highwater (born Jackie Marks; February 13, 1931 – June 3, 2001), also known as "J Marks", was an American writer and journalist of Eastern European Jewish ancestry who mispresented himself as Cherokee.

In the late 1960s, Marks assumed a false Native identity, claiming to be Cherokee, and used the name "Jamake Highwater" for his writings. As Highwater, he wrote and published more than 30 fiction and non-fiction books on music, art, poetry, and history. His children's novel Anpao: An American Indian Odyssey (1973) received a Newbery Honor. His book The Primal Mind: Vision and Reality in Indian America (1981) was the basis of a PBS film documentary about Native American culture.

Marks was exposed as an impostor in 1984 by Assiniboine activist Hank Adams and reporter Jack Anderson in separate publications. Despite this, Marks continued to be widely perceived by the general public as Native American.

== Early life, education, and career ==
Jackie Marks was born on February 13, 1931, in Los Angeles to parents Martha (Turetz) Marks, then 27, and Alexander Marks, then 49; they were born in Philadelphia and New York City respectively. His parents each had immigrant grandparents of Eastern European Jewish ancestry. His family requested the Jewish Star of David for his father's military gravestone. Alexander Marks was a veteran of World War I.

While living in San Francisco, Marks started a small dance company, the San Francisco Contemporary Dancers. He was the principal director and choreographer from 1954 to 1967. Marks moved to New York City around 1969 and started publishing professionally as J. Marks. In New York, he started using the name Jamake Highwater and claiming to be Cherokee. At various times he said his father was Eastern Cherokee and his mother, whom he called Marcia Highwater, was Blackfoot/French.

== Career ==
As Jamake Highwater, Marks wrote and published more than 30 fiction and non-fiction books, including children's books, and works about music, art, poetry, and history. His pseudonym "Jamake Highwater" appeared on Anpao: An American Indian Odyssey (1973), a children's book; and The Sun, He Dies: A Novel About the End of the Aztec World (1980).

In 1981, Marks (as Highwater) published a non-fiction book, The Primal Mind: Vision and Reality in Indian America. By this time, he had made many connections in the media world. PBS adapted this book as the basis of a documentary about Native American culture, The Primal Mind (1984). Marks served as the host of the documentary.

Marks "gained wide public exposure" as Jamake Highwater through making several documentaries on Native American culture for PBS television, and serving as host. In the 1980s, he was known nationally as a Native American figure. In 1993, Marks was a consultant on the TV series Star Trek: Voyager for the character Chakotay. Marks was responsible for verifying each script for accuracy concerning Native American issues.

Marks also wrote for The New Grove Dictionary of Music and Musicians and the Los Angeles Free Press under the Highwater name.

== False ancestry claims ==
Following his move to New York in 1969, Marks claimed his new identity as Jamake Highwater. He said that he had been adopted as an Indian child from Montana by a Greek-American family and raised in Los Angeles (a variation he told was that the family was Armenian). Another time, he said that the Marks family had adopted him as a child. In yet another version he said both his parents were Cherokee. He reportedly graduated from North Hollywood High School, attended college in Los Angeles, and gained a PhD degree by the age of 20; this information was never documented.

Marks gave conflicting accounts of his purported Native American background. He never said that he was enrolled in a Cherokee tribe, but that he had "recovered" his Native identity.

Marks's false claims to American Indian ancestry were explored and documented by Hank Adams (Assiniboine) in a 1984 Akwesasne Notes article. He identified Marks's inconsistencies about birthplace and date, parents, college, and other biographical details. Between 1982 and 1983, Marks and his Primal Mind Foundation had received more than $825,000 in federal grant money from the Corporation for Public Broadcasting (CPB), based on his claimed identification as Native American. His claims of Native ancestry were strongly disputed by American Indian activists and intellectuals, who argued that his works were inauthentic and stereotypical. They said that he had illegally received the grant money by misrepresenting material facts about his life.

Investigative journalist Jack Anderson followed up on Marks in 1984, revealing the inconsistencies in the writer's biography and ultimately, his pose. His column, "A Fabricated Indian?", was published in The Washington Post. Following the major exposé by Anderson, Marks stopped claiming Cherokee heritage in his promotional literature; however, he continued to take advantage of having become publicly established as an "Indian" figure. When questioned by Anderson about why he had assumed a Cherokee identity, Marks said that he had thought he could not break into the writing world otherwise.

Two years after Anderson's exposé, Marks published Shadow Show: An Autobiographical Insinuation (1986), in which he wrote: "the greatest mystery of my life is my own identity." Native American intellectual Gerald Vizenor (Anishinaabe) commented on this that the "impostor" was an artist, and his "insinuations are clever simulations, but surely not a great mystery".

== Death and aftermath ==
Marks died of a heart attack at home on June 3, 2001. Mainstream press such as the New York Times and Los Angeles Times carried obituaries that repeated his false claims about his Native American background. Through his attorney, Marks had blocked access to his papers for at least 50 years.

In response to the published mainstream obituaries, Hank Adams published an open letter that detailed Marks's many falsehoods:

This man was the Golden Indian … he made gold, he made money. It's about stolen voices … he blocked millions of dollars in funding to real Indian writers. We ended his federal funding and TV contracts, but he's still an Indian author, he sold more books than Vine Deloria, his work is still taught in schools and universities to Native and non-Native students. He died an Indian, his lawyer handles his estate and all its Indian royalties. At least this ends it for sure … it finishes his career as an Indian and an Indian expert. He's Jack Marks…not Jamake Highwater. Remember that. He's Jack Marks … not Jamake Highwater. There never was a Jamake Highwater.

Gerald Vizenor described individuals such as Marks, who take on false Native American identities, as "varionatives" in his 2000 book Fugitive Poses.

In 2015, Indian Country Today reported additional findings about Marks's elaborate ruse. It published a copy of his 1931 birth certificate from Los Angeles, and a photograph of his father's military gravestone, marked with the Jewish symbol, a Star of David.

== Honors and legacy ==
- Marks's children's novel, Anpao: An American Indian Odyssey (1973), received a Newbery Honor.
- Marks's children's books received "a half-dozen Best Book for Young Adults awards from the American Library Association and School Library Journal."
- Marks's book The Primal Mind: Vision and Reality in Indian America (1981) was the basis of a PBS documentary, The Primal Mind (1984).

== Representations in other media ==
According to Alex Jacobs, Gerald Vizenor (Anishinaabe) in his 1988 novel, The Trickster of Liberty, based his character Homer Yellow Snow on Jamake Highwater. Jacobs notes that Yellow Snow says to his Native audience:

If you knew who you were, why did you find it so easy to believe in me? … because you want to be white, and no matter what you say in public, you trust whites more than you trust Indians, which is to say, you trust pretend Indians more than real ones.

== Discography ==
- Rock and Other Four Letter Words (1968)

== See also ==
- Plastic shaman
- Pretendian
