= Gloria Bird =

American poet

- Born: 1951 (age 74–75); Yakima Valley, Washington, U.S.
- Education: Portland Community College Cascade Lewis & Clark College (BA) University of Arizona (MA)

Gloria Bird (born 1951) is a Native American poet, essayist, teacher and a member of the Spokane Tribe in Washington State. In her work, Bird’s main priority is to question and diminish harmful stereotypes placed on Native American people. Her focus in on educating about her community in accurate scripts without exploiting the culture.

== Early life ==
Bird was born in 1951 in Yakima Valley, Washington. Growing up, Bird was always in between two reservations, Spokane and Colville, attending American Indian boarding schools. Bird grew up with sisters, mothers, grandparents, and remembers from this time that her sister taught her "how to peel and eat sunflower stalks with a little bit of salt." While in high school, Bird attended the Institute of American Indian Arts in New Mexico. After high school, Bird attended Portland Community College, and went on to Lewis and Clark College in 1990 receiving her bachelors in English and receiving her masters in literature at the University of Arizona in 1992.

== Development as a writer ==
Bird started writing at a young age on the reservation as she was in isolation, and writing her first few poems was a beginning for her. Bird wrote and got her first poetry book published, Full Moon on the Reservation where she landed her first award as a writer in 1993, and in 1997 published her second book The River of History. Bird’s writing has appeared in many anthologies like Speaking for Generations, Reinventing the Enemy's Language and more (see Anthologies below).

== Ongoing themes ==
Bird’s writing describes her life on a reservation not only as a Native American but also a woman. Her work is very much motivated by her agenda to politically educate others about how Native Americans are being stereotyped by not only themselves but others too, and that these standardization can be very harmful to the Native population. Bird also wants to spread her poems in a theme of relations about gender, also writing with passion about the idea of Birth, Death and Rebirth.

== Teaching ==
After graduating from the University of Arizona, Bird worked as a creative writing teacher at her former arts school in New Mexico for five years while being a co-editor for the Wíčazo Ša Review. While teaching, Bird led a "Subversive Literary Strategy" workshop at the Fishtrap Gathering in Joseph, Oregon. Bird is also a founding member of the Northwest Native Writers Association and today is a part time teacher at the Salish Kootenai College and is working for the Spokane tribe. Bird also works for the Wíčazo Ša Review as an associate editor.

== Awards ==
- Diane Memorial Award for Poetry (1992).
- Witter-Bynner Foundation Grant for Individual Writers (1993).
- Oregon Institute of Literary Arts, Oregons Writers Grant (1988).

=== Poetry ===
- The River of History, Trask House Press.
- Full Moon on the Reservation, Greenfield Review Press.
- Reinventing the Enemy's Language: Contemporary Native Women's Writing of North America, Joy Harjo and Gloria Bird (editors), W.W. Norton.

=== Anthologies ===
- River of Memory: The Everlasting Columbia, William D. Layman (editor), Washington Univ. Pr.
- Without Reservation: Indigenous Erotica, Kateri Akiwenzie-Damm (Editor), Kegedonce Press.
- Getting over the Color Green: Contemporary Environmental Literature of the Southwest, Scott Slovic (Editor), Univ. AZ Press.
- First Fish, First People: Salmon Tales of the North Pacific, Judith Roche and Meg McHutchison (Editors), University of Washington Press.
- Speaking for the Generations: Native Writers on Writing (Sun Tracks, Vol. 35), University of Arizona Press.
- Reinventing the Enemy's Language: Contemporary Native Women's Writing of North America, Joy Harjo and Gloria Bird (editors), W.W. Norton.
- The Indian Summer issue of phati’tude Literary Magazine
- Dancing on the Rim of the World: An Anthology of Contemporary Northwest Native American Writing (Sun Tracks, Vol 19), Andrea Lerner (Editor), Univ of Arizona Press.
- Blue Dawn, Red Earth: New Native American Storytellers, Clifford E. Trafzer (Editor), Anchor Books
- Writing the Circle: Native Women of Western Canada: An Anthology, Jeanne Perreault, Sylvia Vance (Editor), Univ of Oklahoma Press.
- Returning the Gift: Poetry and Prose from the First North American Native Writers' Festival (Sun Tracks Books, No 29), University of Arizona Press.
- Talking Leaves: Contemporary Native American Short Stories, Craig Lesley, Katheryn Stavrakis (Editor) Dell Books

=== Interviews and autobiographical essays ===
- Here First, Arnold Krupat (Editor), Brian Swann (Editor), Random House
- Speaking for the Generations: Native Writers on Writing (Sun Tracks, Vol. 35), University of Arizona Press.

== Sources ==
- Oregon Encyclopedia
- Wicazo Sa Review
- The Spokane Tribe from the Wellpinet School System
- A short biography from the Internet Public Library's Native American Authors Project
