= Earthdivers (disambiguation) =

Earthdivers, plural of earthdiver, may refer to:

- Earthdivers: Tribal Narratives on Mixed Descent, a 1981 book by Gerald Vizenor
- Earthdivers, a comic book series by Stephen Graham Jones that started in 2022
