= Charlie Hill =

Native American actor and comedian (1951–2013)

- Hill on The Richard Pryor Show in 1977
- Born: Charles Allan Hill; July 6, 1951; Detroit, Michigan, U.S.
- Died: December 30, 2013 (aged 62); Oneida, Wisconsin, U.S.
- Education: University of Wisconsin–Madison
- Occupations: Comedian, writer, actor
- Years active: 1969–2013
- Spouse: Lenora Hatathlie
- Children: 2 sons, 2 daughters

Charles Allan Hill (July 6, 1951 – December 30, 2013) was a comedian and actor. Hill was one of the first Native American stand-up comedians to appear on major television shows such as The Richard Pryor Show, The Tonight Show with Jay Leno, Late Show with David Letterman, Roseanne, and Moesha. He was a member of the Oneida Nation of Wisconsin, with heritage from the Mohawk and Cree Nations, and belonged to the Turtle Clan. He also wrote for the television series Roseanne and co-produced and hosted a Showtime special called The American Indian Comedy Slam: Goin Native No Reservations Needed. Charlie Hill was the first Native stand-up comedian ever to perform on national television, making his network debut on The Richard Pryor Show in 1977. He then went on to become the first Native comedian to perform on The Tonight Show Starring Johnny Carson among many other national late-night talk shows. Charlie performed across North America for hundreds of Tribal communities and Nations throughout his career.

== Early life and education ==
Born in Detroit, Michigan in 1951, he moved as a child with his family when they returned to their homestead on the Oneida Nation reservation in 1962.

In 1969, he graduated from West De Pere High School and enrolled at University of Wisconsin–Madison, where he majored in speech and drama. He was involved in the Broom Street Theatre Group in Madison, WI.

During the early 1970s, he was a member of the Native American Theatre Ensemble. Among other productions, the ensemble performed Coyote Tracks and Foghorn at La MaMa Experimental Theatre Club in the East Village of Manhattan, where the ensemble was in residence. The ensemble also toured Germany in 1973 and the United States in 1974.

After college, Hill moved to New York City to study acting and later to Los Angeles to pursue his dream of becoming a professional stand-up comedian.

== Career ==
In the 1970s, Hill earned a spot to perform at Hollywood's famous Comedy Store, a scouting ground for major network TV. There, he became fast friends with some of the top comedians at the time. Having made a name for himself at the age of 26, Hill received a once in a lifetime opportunity to debut on The Richard Pryor Show. Hill's first network appearance was on The Richard Pryor Show in 1977. He also appeared on The Tonight Show with Johnny Carson, The Tonight Show with Jay Leno, and made multiple appearances on Late Night with David Letterman.

Hill appeared on the Mike Douglas Show and The Merv Griffin Show several times.

Hill appeared on many television shows, and hosted an evening of Native American comedians on a Showtime special. He was the subject of the PBS documentary On and Off The Res' with Charlie Hill (1999), directed by Sandra Osawa.

Hill was interviewed about American Indian Movement activist Dennis Banks in the documentary A Good Day to Die.

Hill starred in the 1984 film Harold of Orange, written by Gerald Vizenor.

== Awards and recognition ==
- 2009: Ivy Bethune Tri-Union Diversity Award
- 2010: "Native America on the Web" honored Hill for his "lifetime of promoting positive images of Native Peoples and bridging cultural differences through the healing power of humor"
- 2012: Jennifer Easton Community Spirit Award for his exceptional work as a Native artist.
- 2022: On July 6, the Google Doodle was dedicated to Hill in recognition of his challenging harmful stereotypes in the entertainment industry as well as being the first Native comedian to be on national television.

== Selected film and television credits ==
- 2010: A Good Day to Die (Hill is interviewed about Dennis Banks)
- 2009: Reel Injun (documentary; comedy routine by Hill)
- 2009: Goin' Native: The Indian Comedy Slam – No Reservations Needed (television film
- 2004–2006: Late Show with David Letterman
- 2005: CBC Winnipeg Comedy Festival (television series)
- 2004: City Confidential (television documentary)
- 1999: On and Off the Res with Charlie Hill (documentary)
- 1996: White Shamans and Plastic Medicine Men (documentary short)
- 1996: Moesha (television series)
- 1995: Roseanne
- 1993: North of 60 (television series)
- 1992: The Tonight Show with Jay Leno
- 1986: Impure Thoughts
- 1985: MacGruder and Loud (television series)
- 1985: Late Night with David Letterman
- 1984: Earthlings (television film)
- 1984: Harold of Orange (short film)
- 1980: The Big Show (television series)
- 1978: The Bionic Woman (television series)
- 1977: The Richard Pryor Show

== Death ==
Hill died on December 30, 2013, in Oneida, Wisconsin, of Non-Hodgkins lymphoma.
