= Griever =

Griever could refer to

- A mourner
- Squall Leonhart, the lead character in Final Fantasy VIII
- Griever de Hocus, the lead character in Gerald Vizenor's novel Griever: An American Monkey King in China
- Griever, a creature in The Maze Runner by James Dashner
