= Sandra Osawa =

American poet

Sandra Sunrising Osawa is a Makah filmmaker and poet. She is best known for her films Lighting the Seventh Fire (1995) and On and Off the Res with Charlie Hill (1999).

== Early life and education ==
Osawa is a member of the Makah nation of Washington state. She grew up in a family of six on the Makah Reservation in summers and Port Angeles, Wa., during the school years. Her father was a commercial fisherman. She studied at Lewis & Clark College where she got her B.A. in both Political Science and English in 1964. She studied with the poets William Stafford and Vern Rutsala while at Lewis & Clark. After she graduated, she worked on the Makah Reservation as Community Action Director and created her tribe's first Head Start Program. In 1971, she edited The Talking Leaf for the Los Angeles Indian Center as a part of their public information department. She attended film school at University of California, Los Angeles. And just prior to film school she worked on UCLA's high potential program as an English instructor.

== TV work ==
Osawa directed, wrote, and produced the Native American Series for NBC in 1974. The series focused on Native American issues and featured both Native guests, like Buffy Sainte-Marie, and non-Native guests who were concerned with Native issues, like Marlon Brando. By 1975, series became popular and aired before the Today Show. Despite the fact that the series would air at 6:30 AM, it still had a following; Osawa would receive letters asking that the program be played at a "decent hour" She was the first Native American to produce a TV series for NBC. She also was the first Native filmmaker to produce a POV program with PBS. Osawa also worked with her husband for the Seattle-based KSTW-11 public affairs program, Native Vision. Under a grant from the Washington State Commission for the Humanities, she created the documentary, Eagles Caged. Eagles Caged focused on the female Native American inmates incarcerated in the women's prison in Purdy, Washington.

== Film career ==
In 1980, she formed Upstream productions with her husband, Yasu Osawa. She met Osawa while at UCLA. Her first documentary, In the Heart of Big Mountain focuses on Kathrine Smith, a Navajo matriarch and the relocation of her tribe. She worked on The Eight Fire for NBC which examined treaty rights in three different parts of the U.S. She then, worked on her film Lighting the Seventh Fire, a film about Chippewa spearfishing rights in Wisconsin. The film's title refers to the Chippewa Seven fires prophecy. In 1995, she released Pepper's Pow Wow, a documentary that focused on the life of Kaw-Muscogee jazz saxophonist Jim Pepper. The first part of her film Usual and Accustomed Places aired at Sundance in 1997. In 1999, she made the documentary On and Off the Res with Charlie Hill about Oneida comedian Charlie Hill. Her 2007 film, Maria Tallchief, examined the life of the first Native American ballerina Maria Tallchief.

== Awards ==
Osawa has received many awards for her work including best documentary in 1994 for Lighting the Seventh Fire at the American Indian Film Festival and the Taos American Indian Filmmaker of the Year in 1996.

== Selected filmography ==
- Goin' Back (1975, released in 1995)
- In the Heart of Big Mountain (1988)
- Lighting the Seventh Fire (1995)
- Pepper's Pow Wow (1996)
- On and Off the Res with Charlie Hill (1999)
- Usual and Accustomed Places (Part 1 1997, 2000)
- Maria Tallchief (2007)
- Princess Angeline (2010)
