= The Sun, He Dies =

1980 novel by Jamake Highwater

The Sun, He Dies is a 1980 novel written by Jamake Highwater.

== Plot summary ==
The Sun, He Dies is a novel in which life is depicted in the Aztec capital Tenochtitlan, as well as the Spanish conquest.

== Reception ==
Ernest Hogan reviewed The Sun, He Dies for Different Worlds magazine and stated that "It is a vision that will teach you things about magic and reality that will cause your own imagination to burn brighter, and make your fantasies more fantastic and real."

== Reviews ==
- Multiple reviews listed in the Children's Literature Review
