= Harold of Orange =

1984 film

- Directed by: Richard Weise
- Screenplay by: Gerald Vizenor
- Produced by: Dianne Brennan
- Starring: Charlie Hill; Cathleen Fuller; Bruce Murray; Deforest White Eagle; Michael Anthony Hall; James Noah; Edward W. Noreen
- Narrated by: Charlie Hill
- Cinematography: Gregory M. Cummins, Sandra Maliga, Melinda Ward
- Edited by: Stephen E. Rivkin
- Music by: Buffy Sainte-Marie, Floyd Red Crow Westerman, Leo Kottke, James Quill Band
- Production company: FILM in the CITIES
- Distributed by: VisionMaker Video
- Release date: May 17, 1984 (Minneapolis, Minnesota)
- Running time: 33min 21 sec
- Country: United States
- Language: English

Harold of Orange is a comedy short film directed by Richard Weise and produced by Dianne Brennan, with a screenplay by Gerald Vizenor.

== Plot ==
Tribal tricksters Harold Sinseer (Charlie Hill) and the Warriors of Orange, embark on a mission to give a proposal to the Bily foundation. Harold and company are looking to obtain a grant to produce miniature oranges and pinch beans. In the story, Harold's proposal is presented in a way that he states will "revolutionize the reservation way of life". Harold convinces both the Warriors of Orange and the foundation, that the miniature oranges and pinch beans will diminish alcoholism, spark political discussions and open the market for coffee shops across the reservation he lives.

== Production ==
The original screenplay done by Gerald Vizenor, is an example of Native American comedy and examines different types of humor. There are three types of humor involved in both the screenplay and the film. Indians making fun of themselves, making fun of historical events and the most controversial, making fun of whites. Through subversive satire, Harold sheds light on the irony of the bureaucracy of business between whites and the Native people. The film also touches on key issues such as the treatment of Indian remains, the Bureau of Indian Affairs and how Native Americans and whites are viewed stereotypically. Through its humorous treatment, applied to both Indians' and whites' behavior motives, the film makes an unusual multifaceted comment on contemporary Native American life.

== Cast ==
The film cast includes:

- Charlie Hill
- Barbara Davidson
- Cathleen Fuller
- Michael Anthony Hall
- Bruce Murray
- James Noah
- Edward W. Noreen
- Deforest White Eagle
- Alan Woodward
- Neil Buckanaga
- William R. Laroque
- William Pensoneau

== Personnel ==
The personnel of the film are:

- Production Manager-Kirk Hokanson
- Casting Director- Sherry Virsen
- Production Sound Mixer- Matthew Quast
- Costumes- Sonya Berlovitz
- Make-up Advisor- Gary Boham
- Assistant Camera- Jerry Pope
- Field Production- Sheryl Mousley
- Set Decorator- Laila Schirrmeister
- Editing Assistant- Therese Kunz
- Location Scouts- David Dancyger/Curtis Wenzel
- Production Equipment- Lighthouse Inc.
- Music Recording Studio- The Village Recorder.

== Soundtrack ==
The film's soundtrack consists of the following tracks:

| Title | Credits |
|---|---|
| "Trickster" and "Fast Bucks" | Written and Performed by: Buffy Sainte-Marie |
| "49-Song" | Arranged and Performed by: Buffy Sainte-Marie & Floyd Red Crow Westerman |
| "When Shrimps Learn to Whistle"; "June Bug"; "Machine #2" | Written and Performed by: Leo Kottke Published by: Round Wound Inc. |
| "Cripple Creek" | Traditional, Arranged and Performed by: Leo Kottke Published by: Round Wound Inc. |
| "How Long Have You Been Blind?" | Written by: Floyd Red Crow Westerman and the James Quill Band Published by: Clara Music |
| "BIA Blues" | Written by- Floyd Red Crow Westerman and the James Quill Band Published by: RedCrow Publishing |

== Funding ==
The film received funding from the Northwest Area Foundation, National Endowment for the Arts, the Archie D. and Bertha B. Walker Foundation, and assistance from: The Sundance Institute.
