= Anpao: An American Indian Odyssey =

1977 children's book

- Author: Jamake Highwater
- Illustrator: Fritz Scholder
- Language: English
- Genre: Children's literature
- Publisher: Lippincott
- Publication date: 1975
- Publication place: United States
- Media type: Hardback (Lippincott) / Paperback (Trophy)

Anpao: An American Indian Odyssey is a 1977 novel written by Jamake Highwater and illustrated by Fritz Scholder. Styled after Homer's Odyssey, the holy man Wasicong narrates the story of the hero Anpao and his quest to secure the Sun's permission to marry Ko-ko-mik-e-is. Highwater said he developed the story “out of the many stories of the boyhood of early Indians ... in order to make an Indian ‘Ulysses’ who could become the central dramatic character in the saga of Indian life in North America." The book was awarded a Newbery Honor in 1978.

== Controversy ==
Highwater, whose real name was Jackie Marks, claimed Blackfoot and Cherokee ancestry. He was exposed as a fraud with no native American ancestry in 1984. Scholar Debbie Reese criticized the American Library Association's decision to award Anpao with a Newbery Honor, accusing them of perpetuating stereotypes by overlooking Marks' "collapsing distinct stories into a singular “American Indian” existence [which] contributed to the stereotypical idea that Native peoples are a monolith."
