= Low Dog =

Chief of the Oglala Lakota

- Šúŋka Khúčiyela
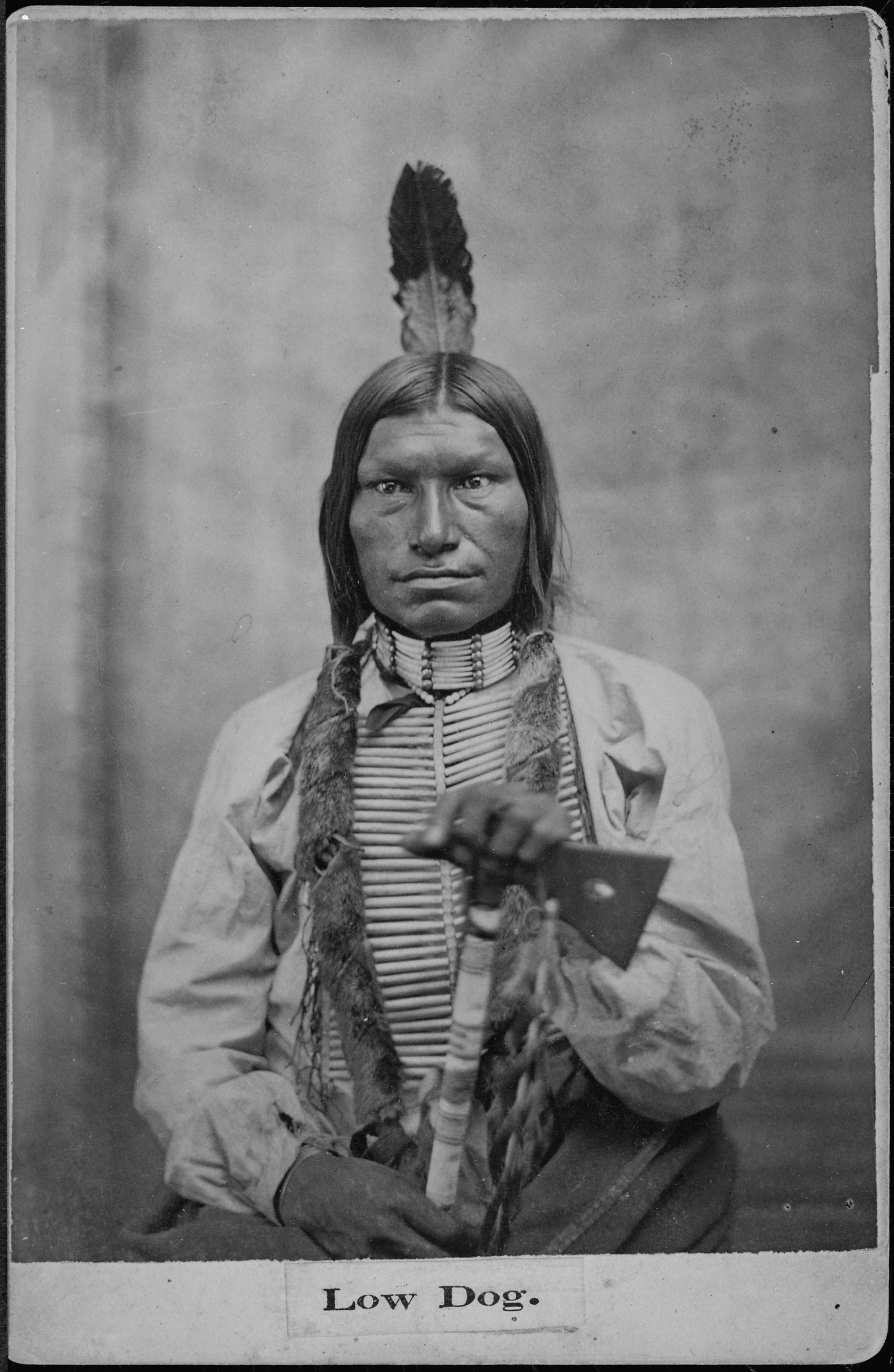

Oglala Lakota leader

Personal details
- Born: c.1846
- Died: November 14, 1894

Military service
- Battles/wars: Little Bighorn

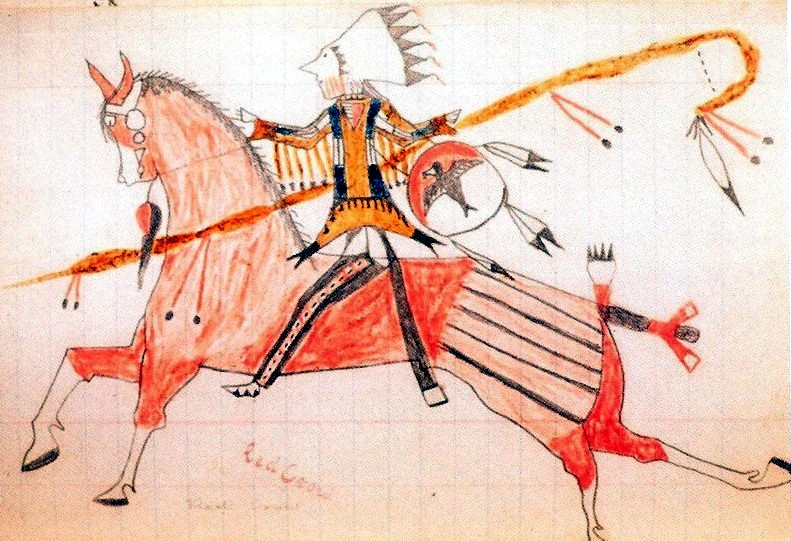
1884 crayon ledger drawing by Lakota artist Red Dog honoring the valor of Low Dog

Low Dog (Lakota: Šúŋka Khúčiyela) (c. 1846–1894) (aka. Phil Cosgrove) was an Oglala Lakota chief who fought with Sitting Bull at the Battle of the Little Bighorn.

He became a war chief at age 14. Low Dog provided an account of the Battle of Little Bighorn that was published in the Leavenworth, Kansas Weekly Times of August 18, 1881. After surrendering in 1881, he lived at Standing Rock Agency.

Low Dog is credited with the quotation "This is a good day to die. Follow me."
