= Rock and Other Four Letter Words =

Studio album by Marks and Lebzelter
- Released: December 1968
- Studios: 30th Street Studio, New York
- Genres: Electronic; rock; sound collage; avant-garde; musique concrète; free jazz; psychedelia
- Length: 49:39
- Label: Columbia Masterworks
- Producer: John McClure

Rock and Other Four Letter Words is a collaborative album by American writer J Marks and composer Shipen Lebzelter (credited together as Marks and Lebzelter), released in December 1968 by Columbia Masterworks. Produced by John McClure, it is the companion to Marks' paperback book of the same name, which profiled the writer's interviews with many major rock musicians and personalities. He and Lebzelter created the album using the Moog III synthesizer and cut-up excerpts of the interview tapes, which featured 27 hours of conversation with 53 musicians.

The record has been described as a work of electronic, psychedelic and avant-garde music, using a sound collage approach that mixes snippets of interviews and musical contributions from a large personnel, including the Gregg Smith Singers and a baptist choir directed by Alex Bradford. It was one of three albums used to launch Columbia's "Bach to Rock" campaign, which drew links between rock and the music of Johann Sebastian Bach; although it was expected to be the biggest commercial success of the three releases, it underperformed and reportedly only sold several thousand copies. Music critics discussed the album's unusual concept and experimentation. In 2012, the album was re-released by Paradigm Discs.

== Background and recording ==
Rock and Other Four Letter Words is the companion album, or "auditory extension", of a paperback book of the same name, also authored by J Marks. Published in 1968 by Bantam Books, with photography from Linda Eastman, the book is a stylized pop encyclopedia that compiles pictures and quotations from rock musicians interviewed by Marks, alongside fold-out pages, large typography and humour, in a manner comparable to the work of Marshall McLuhan. It was one of several breakthrough 1968 books on rock and pop music authored by the first generation of writers and journalists to, according to Doug Thompson of the Tribune, "[concern] themselves with serious literary studies of the social phenomenon called pop music." Ritchie Yorke grouped Marks' book with The Poetry of Rock (compiled by Richard Goldstein and also published by Bantam), in that both exemplified the emergence of young people responding to rock music via writing and prose and creating an audience for rock books, which helped evidence how rock and pop were becoming culturally legitimized. (Note: In his review of the paperback, Jenkin Lloyd Jones praised Marks' rock interviews, describing them as capturing "the essence of the wonderful new age of honesty. Best of all, it's a sort of easy honesty.")

For the album, also titled Rock and Other Four Letter Words, Marks collaborated with composer and filmmaker Shipen Lebzelter, with production from John McClure of Columbia Records. As the basis for the record, Marks used his interviews with major rock bands and personalities, which he had captured with a tape recorder; the author had travelled around the world to hold these meetings, in which rapport was established. According to writer Scott G. Campbell, the tapes included "such rarely interviewed people as Donovan and George Martin, musical director of the Beatles." After returning to Columbia's 30th Street Studio in New York, Marks and Lebzelter took the tapes and cut, spliced, sliced, chopped and fed them into a "hungry" Moog III synthesizer to create the album. Overall, the record incorporates outtakes from "27 hours of interviews ... with 53 rock stars". In addition to the interviews, the album includes musical contributions from "the Gregg Smith Singers, the Greater Abyssinian Baptist Choir directed by Alex Bradford and an estimated three dozen solo singers and instrumentalists." The liner notes credit "a cast of thousands, Including the voices, comments, yawns and blurbs of bunches of international rock stars and various other good people". The recording was created as a stereo LP.

== Composition ==
Rock and Other Four Letter Words is described by author Amanda Sewell as "an album of free jazz and psychedelic music mixed with audio clips of rock musicians", while writer Thom Holmes calls it a rock album that comprises a collage, mixing free jazz and psychedelia with "snippets of rock notables". Albert Glinsky calls it an "aural grab bag", combining snippets from Marks' rock interviews with "excerpted recordings of rock bands, the Gregg Smith Singers, the Greater Abyssinian Baptist Choir, and electronic sounds", further deeming the tracks to be "generally chaotic sound collages". Among the interviewed rock musicians whose voices are heard are Ginger Baker, Brian Wilson, Tim Buckley, Jefferson Airplane, Pete Townshend, Janis Joplin, Judy Collins, John Sebastian, Phil Everly, Dave Clark, Jimmy Page and producer Mickey Most, with the musicians' personalities highlighted.

The album has also been described as a work of avant-garde, and electronic, or "electronic, rock-oriented" music. The original musical content is heavy and highly eclectic; according to critic Charles McKinney, it ranges from "gospel to protest to zook sounds to electronic efforts". Music critic Oregano Rathbone highlights the record's Moog work, atonal experimentation with musique concrète and tape manipulation, while David F. Wagner compared the album's combination of 'salon rock' ("both orchestrated and choral") with Marks' interview outtakes to the Mothers of Invention, likening it to what the group "might come up with if they were asked to dedicate an entire album to plugging a book by Frank Zappa." Delaware County Daily Times deemed the recording to be "based on the standard 32 bar rock melody, arranged in sequences which build to crescendi."

"Other Four Letter Words", with its chorus of four-letter words, is built around eerie whispering which segues into a deluge of soundbites from artists including Wilson and Townshend, treated with "heavy, hallucinogenic echo." "Essence of Its Own" was described by McKinney as "pop-based electronic weirdness" reminiscent of the film 2001: A Space Odyssey (1968). The title, a quotation from Frederic Henry Hedge, is repeated throughout the track, such that it becomes a "narcotic mantra". "Baked Beans" is a joke song with an uplifting gospel chorus that segues into the spiritual "Down by the Riverside", while "They're Through" is a protest number denouncing The Establishment; according to Wagner, it can be interpreted as "a revolutionary call to arms or a parody of same". "Eine Kleine Hayakwa" was described by Rathbone as "a paroxysm of stuttering, stitched into a collage – and painstakingly transcribed on the sleeve". One part of the track is an abstraction of Marks' discussions with Everly and Felix Pappalardi. Wagner says that the song, coupled with the following "Do You Understand What I'm Trying to Say?", make for "a terse statement on communication". Sung by Carol Miller and Hilda Harris, the lyrics of "Poop for Sopranos and Orchestras" were arbitrarily chosen from various sportscasts.

== Release and promotion ==
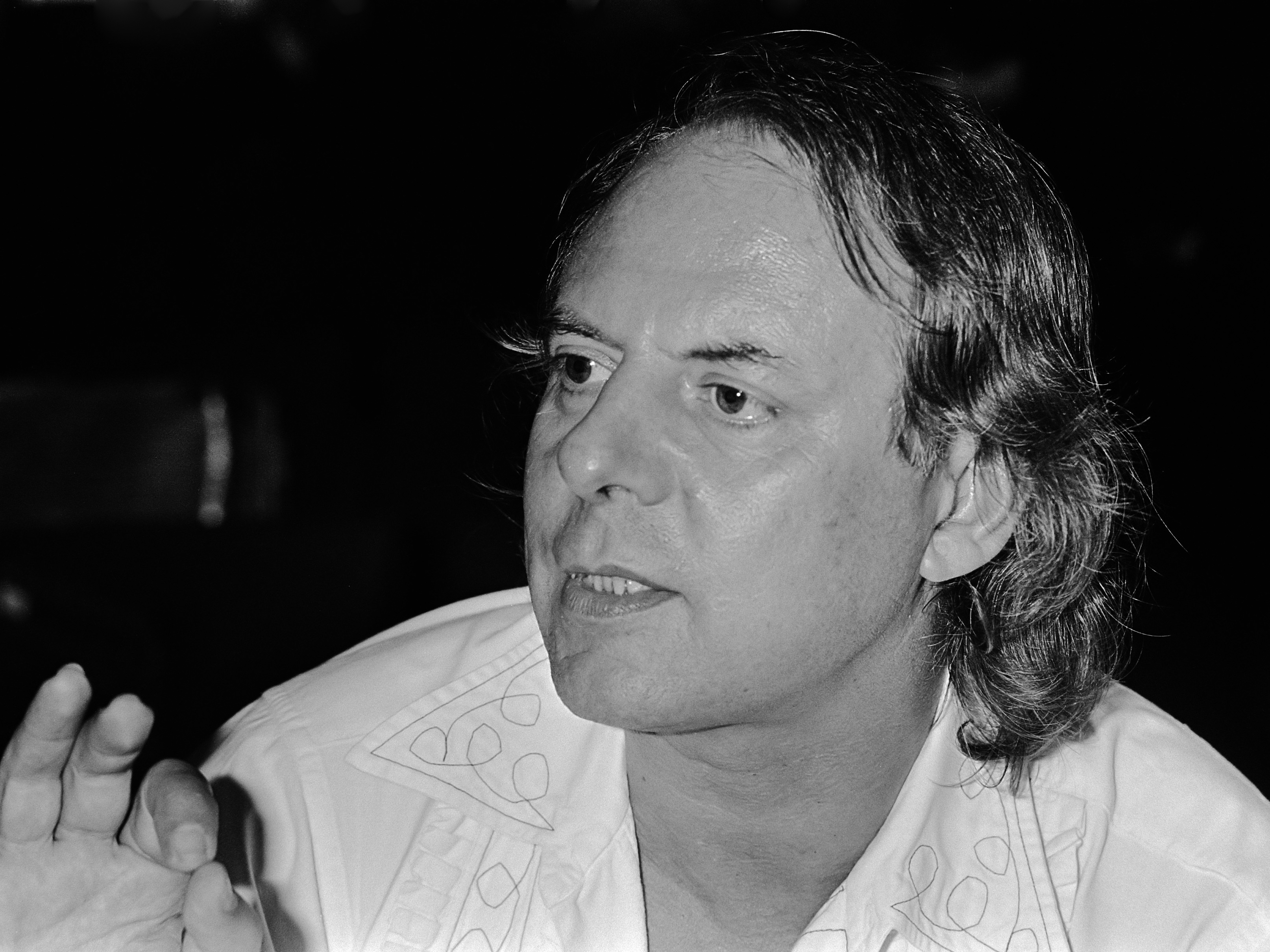
Karlheinz Stockhausen (1980), whom the album is dedicated to

Released in December 1968, Rock and Other Four Letter Words appeared on Columbia Masterworks, an imprint of Columbia Records that, according to Rathbone, "merely added an intimidating veneer of high-mindedness" to the album, thus compounding "the avant-garde felony". The artwork features an arrangement of text, described by Glinsky as comprising "mostly hip snark or impenetrable jumbles of interview outtakes." For instance, Judy Collins is quoted as commenting "Ta'a-nita'nit Exi-fit's-if' it's-of-ahah-if' it's-ah-", and Marks responds with "Yeahof' of' of' of'." The album is dedicated to Karlheinz Stockhausen, "who destroyed our ears so we could hear." Wagner criticised Marks for using Stockhausen's name to promote the album.

The album was one of three simultaneously released to launch Columbia's "Bach to Rock" campaign, alongside Wendy Carlos' Moog project Switched-On Bach and Terry Riley's minimalist work In C. The campaign sought to link rock with the music of composer Johann Sebastian Bach, with the angle that progressive rock was "taking the classics out of the concert hall and bringing them to the rock generation." (Note: According to Riley, the three albums were intended "to capture the imagination of the young audience".) The three records were announced in Billboard, and on December 4, Columbia Masterworks hosted a release party for them at their 30th Street Studio in Manhattan. Described as a "total environment program", the event included Marks' performance of a theatre work with his troupe; he wore attached amulets down his exposed chest. To promote the campaign, Masterworks distributed a 12-page underground-style newspaper to Columbia's distribution staff, key radio stations and trade and consumer press.

Of the three albums, Rock and Other Four Letter Words was expected to achieve the biggest commercial success, but it sold very poorly. According to Robert Moog, Rock merely sold "a few thousand records", whereas In C sold several tens of thousand copies and Switched-On Bach sold over a million copies. He described Marks' effort as an "abysmal record" and criticised Columbia for undervaluing Switched-On Bach with the joint release campaign. Although Marks' LP sold poorly in the United States, it was more successful in Europe and also received fan mail from Stockhausen and Zappa. In 1969, it was reported that some of Marks' interview tapes would form the basis of a radio program; hosted by Marks, it was for the ABC-FM radio network and also named Rock and Other Four Letter Words. As of late 1968, a film based on part of the album had also reached the preparation stage. In 2012, the album was re-released in the United Kingdom as an LP by Paradigm Discs.

== Critical reception ==
Professional ratings
Review scores
Source	Rating
Record Collector	4/5 stars

In a contemporary review for The Indianapolis News, Charles McKinney wrote that Rock and Other Four Letter Words uses "the very sounds" of pop culture to create "a kind of music, or language, or environment, however one wishes to categorize it." He noted the controversial nature of many of the interview excerpts and praised the record as "a fascinating, integrated conglomerate of words, coughs, sniffs, serious asides, howls, put downs, sighs and songs." In an article for The Arizona Republic, Scott G. Campbell called it "one of the most unusual and original record albums of the year." He wrote that it was unlike any album he had heard before and advised readers to "get a chance to listen to it", regardless of whether they decide to purchase a copy. He quoted Marty Balin of Jefferson Airplane to conclude that pop music was innovating new ideas.

Record World described the album as a "rock novelty" and an intriguing attempt to "create an impressionistic portrait of the sounds, musical and otherwise, of the time." In their review, Billboard wrote: "If you're tuned in to the electronics, the narrative and the other hallucinatory gimmicks, it could provide unusual and interesting fare." They further praised the engineering work and contended that the album could receive heavy airplay on underground radio stations. In The Post-Crescent, David F. Wagner wrote that the record is boring at worst and "quite amusing" at best, deeming it to be "most enjoyable when heard in small sections at several sittings." Reviewing the Paradigm Discs reissue for Record Collector, Oregano Rathbone wrote that the original release was, until the mid-1970s, an album that "everyone seemed to have heard of" but very few people had actually heard, and even fewer enjoyed. He added that the magazine "love" the album, naming it "an early masterpiece of tape manipulation, Moog scribbles and musique concrète atonality." Though noting that the album is often compared to Zappa's Lumpy Gravy (1968), he added its "closer cousin" is We're Only in It for the Money (also 1968).

== Track listing ==
All songs written by J Marks except where noted.

=== Side one ===
1. "Other Four Letter Words" (Marks, Shipen Lebzelter) – 6:24
2. "Essence of Its Own" – 5:44
3. "It's True" (Gustav Marks) – 3:17
4. "Greatest Hits – Love Your Navel" (Marks, Lebzelter) – 2:24
5. "In the Middle of Nothing" (Lebzelter) – 4:12
6. "Baked Beans" (Marks, Lebzelter) – 3:38

=== Side two ===
7. "They're Through" – 5:54
8. "Today" – 1:26
9. "Eine Kleine Hayakawa" (Marks, Lebzelter) – 1:25
10. "Do You Understand What I'm Trying to Say?" (Lebzelter) – 3:19
11. "Trouble" – 2:18
12. "Poop for Sopranos and Orchestra" (Marks, Lebzelter) –7:57
13. "This is the Word" (Marks; words by Woody Guthrie) – 1:43

== Personnel ==
Adapted from the liner notes of Rock and Other Four Letter Words.

- J Marks – creator, Moog III synth, rock riff ("Other Four Letter Words"), vocals ("Greatest Hits – Love Your Navel", "Today", "Do You Understand What I'm Trying to Say?"), soloist ("Greatest Hits – Love Your Navel", "Today", "Do You Understand What I'm Trying to Say?")
- Shipen Lebzelter – creator, Moog III synth, vocals ("Essence of Its Own", "Greatest Hits – Love Your Navel", "Do You Understand What I'm Trying to Say?"), soloist ("Essence of Its Own", "Greatest Hits – Love Your Navel", "Do You Understand What I'm Trying to Say?")
- Gerri Kuczynski – vocals ("Other Four Letter Words"), soloist ("Other Four Letter Words")
- William Graf – vocals ("Other Four Letter Words"), soloist ("Other Four Letter Words")
- Carol Miller – alto vocals, vocals ("It's True", "Greatest Hits – Love Your Navel", "Today", "Do You Understand What I'm Trying to Say?", "Poop for Sopranos and Orchestra"), soloist ("It's True", "Greatest Hits – Love Your Navel", "Today", "Do You Understand What I'm Trying to Say?", "Poop for Sopranos and Orchestra")
- Hilda Harris – soprano vocals, vocals ("It's True", "Greatest Hits – Love Your Navel", "Today", "Do You Understand What I'm Trying to Say?", "Poop for Sopranos and Orchestra"), soloist ("It's True", "Greatest Hits – Love Your Navel", "Today", "Do You Understand What I'm Trying to Say?", "Poop for Sopranos and Orchestra")
- Mickey Most – vocals ("Baked Beans"), soloist ("Baked Beans")
- Janet Graham – vocals ("They're Through"), soloist ("They're Through")
- Alex Bradford – director ("Baked Beans"), gospel piano ("Baked Beans"), baritone vocals ("Baked Beans"), vocals ("Trouble"), soloist ("Trouble")
- Bruce A. Johnson – bass guitar
- Alan Silva – cello, contractor
- Greater Abyssinian Baptist Choir – choir ("Baked Beans")
- The Gregg Smith Singers – chorus ("Other Four Letter Words", "Essence of Its Own", "In the Middle of Nothing", "They're Through", "Eine Kleine Hayakawa", "This Is the Word")
- Gregg Smith – conductor ("Other Four Letter Words", "Essence of Its Own", "In the Middle of Nothing", "They're Through", "Eine Kleine Hayakawa", "This Is the Word")
- Cecil Garrett – gospel drums
- Nick Gefron – drums, leader
- Art Kendy – engineer
- Fred Plaut – engineer
- Glen Kolotkin – engineer
- Larry Packer – electric fiddle
- Clarence Drayton – gospel guitar
- Jake Jacobs – lead guitar
- Alberta Bradford – gospel organ
- Burton Greene – organ, piano, celeste
- Andrew Cyrille – percussion
- Laurence Cook – percussion
- Warren Smith – percussion
- Blaine Farris – piano, organ, celeste
- John McClure – producer
- Gerard Hayes – reeds
- Martin Atler – reeds
- William Draper – reeds
- Jonathan Sachs – rhythm guitar
- Michael Berdardi – rhythm guitar
- Bob Walker – rhythm guitar
- Roswell Rudd – trombone
- Jimmy Owens – trumpet
- Michael Ripley – trumpet
- Steve Furtado – trumpet
