= The Trickster of Liberty =

Novel by Gerald Vizenor

- Author: Gerald Vizenor
- Language: English
- Publisher: University of Minnesota Press
- Publication date: 1988
- Dewey Decimal: 813.54
- LC Class: PS3572.I9 T7

The Trickster of Liberty is a 1988 novel by Gerald Vizenor that acts as a prequel to his earlier novels Bearheart: The Heirship Chronicles and Griever: An American Monkey King in China. The novel is a collection of stories about the mixedblood descendants of Luster Browne and their lives on the White Earth Indian Reservation. The novel continues Vizenor's focus on mixedbloods and tricksters and includes characters from the previous novels, including Griever de Hocus and China Brown from Griever and Eternal Flame from Bearheart.

The novel develops Vizenor's rejection of social science theories that claim the trickster figure reflects an idea or model; to the contrary, Vizenor argues that the trickster is a purely linguistic phenomenon. The novel also develops Vizenor's attack on the "invented Indian", including a commentary on the fate of Ishi and a satire on Native American scholars who perpetuate stereotypes of Indian-ness.

The novel was republished under the title The Trickster of Liberty: Native Heirs to a Wild Baronage in 2005.
