= A good day to die =

Phrase associated with Native Americans

"A good day to die" (or "today is a good day to die") is a phrase historically associated with certain Native American cultures, although it appears to mischaracterize the historical sources, and its actual origin is unclear.

== Usage ==
The phrase has since been used in other cultural contexts. For example, in the Star Trek franchise, it occurs several times as a Klingon saying, with Star Trek writer Marc Okrand proposing several ways to say the phrase in the Klingon language. Starship Troopers 3: Marauder also features a patriotic song called by the phrase. In another example, Jun Guevaru from the anime Baki Hanma always says the phrase before a fight. The film A Good Day to Die Hard also appropriates the phrase in its title.

== History ==
In 1849, the phrase was reported to have been said by Willbur Fisk, a Methodist minister who had actively proselytized among Native Americans and helped secure a translation of the Bible into Mohawk, twelve days before his death (in 1839): "In the morning he asked Mrs. Fisk what day it was. On ascertaining, he observed, 'This would be a good day to die'".

An 1879 newspaper account relayed a story of Húŋkpapȟa chief Running Antelope using the phrase to save trapper Fred Gerard ("Girard" in the account) from being executed on the orders of Sitting Bull, stating that:

In the presence of fourteen hundred Indians he mounted a little knoll and electrified the camp with the exclamation: "This is a good day to die. Who will die with me?" The grand courage of the chief and his thrilling eloquence broke the solid phalanx of warriors. In squads they came over and gathered close around the fearless insurgent. The rebellion was a success. To avoid a doubtful civil war Sitting Bull concluded to spare the lives of his prisoners.

In "Campaigns of General Custer in the North-west, and the Final Surrender of Sitting Bull" published in 1881, author Judson Elliott Walker relates an account from Low Dog, as told to Captain Howe of the Standing Rock Agency: "I [Low Dog] called to my men: 'This is a good day to die; follow me'".

In "Black Elk Speaks" published in 1932, recounting the Battle of the Little Bighorn described the warriors under Crazy Horse: "off toward the west and north they were yelling 'Hokahey!' like a big wind roaring, and making the tremolo; and you could hear eagle bone whistles screaming". Hokahey is simply an exclamation to draw attention, similar to a coach saying, "Let's do it!" It is likely neither Low Dog nor Crazy Horse ever said "Today is a good day to die", which is the English bastardization of a common Oceti Sakowin battle-cry: Nake nula wauŋ welo! (nake nula waung). This phrase means, 'I am ready for whatever comes'. It was meant to show the warriors were not afraid of the battle or dying in it.

Native American Activist Dennis Banks quoted the phrase during a 1973 speech in Custer, South Dakota, against judicial proceedings that had resulted in reduced charges for a white man to a second degree offense for killing a Native American man. Dennis Banks cofounded the American Indian Movement and a documentary about him is also called A Good Day to Die.

Another author describes it as the ending of a Lakota prayer.

Regarding the war cry "today is a good day to die", most presume the now-popular statement refers to patriotic sentiment. That is, warriors should always be willing to die while proudly defending their families and home territory. Indeed, such was probably at the heart of the phrase when skirmishing the cavalry. An unsolicited interpretation offered by an Ottawa woman, however, carried a different meaning. "We Indians have an expression 'today is a good day to die'. It means that we should be ready to die on any given day. We should always be prepared to die, and have no regrets. That's why it's important to begin each day fresh, and not let past problems or present distractions cloud how God wants us to live".

The film Smoke Signals (1998) plays with this concept:

Hence, the film self-consciously references other westerns, most notably Little Big Man, with its line "It's a good day to die" refigured in three different ways in Smoke Signals: "Sometimes it's a good day to die and sometimes it's a good day to play basketball", "It's a good day to be indigenous", and "Sometimes it's a good day to die and sometimes it's a good day to have breakfast".
