= Bearheart =

1990 novel by Gerald Vizenor

- The cover from Bearheart's 1990 publication.
- Author: Gerald Vizenor
- Original title: Darkness in Saint Louis: Bearheart
- Language: English
- Publisher: University of Minnesota Press
- Publication date: June 25, 1990
- Publication place: United States
- ISBN: 9780816618521

Bearheart: The Heirship Chronicles is a 1990 novel by Gerald Vizenor; it is a revised version of his 1978 debut novel Darkness in Saint Louis: Bearheart. The novel is a part of the Native American Renaissance and is considered one of the first Native American novels to introduce a trickster figure into a contemporary setting. Vizenor drew from trickster traditions from various Native American tribes, such as Nanabozho (Anishinaabe) and Kachina (Pueblo).

The novel follows the adventures of Proude Cedarfair as he leads a group of mixedbloods on a pilgrimage across a post-apocalyptic and post-industrial United States that has run out of gasoline. The novel demonstrates several of Vizenor's key concepts: his use of trickster figures; his use of mixedblood (or "crossblood") Native characters in a non-tragic way; his version of magical realism—what he calls "mythic verism"; his conception of "postindian" identity; and his use of parody, as in the way the novel parodies both Chaucer's The Canterbury Tales and Frederick Jackson Turner's "Frontier Thesis".

== Plot ==
The novel begins by explaining the history and lineage of the four different Proude Cedarfairs and their different relationships to the sacred trees. All of the different Proude Cedarfairs stand out in different ways, but they all hold the sacred trees with high importance. The fourth Proude Cedarfair, the trickster protagonist, gets introduced and from there readers are introduced to the problem of a nationwide gasoline shortage. The gasoline shortage causes civilization to collapse. Proude continues living on his sacred land until federal agents demand that he move, leading him and his wife Rosina Cedarfair to leave their land and begin their pilgrimage. As the pilgrimage commences, they run into a variety of different characters, all with distinct personality traits and personal stories that reveal aspects of who they are to the reader.

The circus-pilgrims, as they are continually referred to throughout the novel, continue to pick up members, whether human or animal, but they also lose members at the same rate. The various situations the pilgrims find themselves in have different themes, and different characters have different philosophies. The group has several tricksters, including Proude, leading them to escape many dire situations they repeatedly find themselves in. The circus-pilgrims begin to lose more members than they gain until the only ones left are Proude, Rosina, and Inawa Biwide. The book ends with Proude and Inawa transforming into bears and abandoning their lives as circus-pilgrims.

== Characters ==
- Proude Cedarfair: The protagonist of the novel and leader of the twelve pilgrims. He is the Fourth Chief of the Cedar Nation and a shaman of mixed white and Chippewa (Anishinaabe) ancestry.
- Rosina Cedarfair: The wife of Proude Cedarfair. She is one of the three people who enter into the fourth world.
- The 7 Crows: A group of crows that follow the group of pilgrims throughout the novel and aid them along their journey.
- Sir Cecil Staples, also called The Evil Gambler: The proprietor of the What Cheer Trailer Ruins. He gambles with passersby and bets gasoline against the life of the bettors.
- Inawa Biwide: A 16-year-old pilgrim rescued from federal reservation housing by the church. Inawa becomes an apprentice shaman and eventually will follow Proude Cedarfair into the fourth world.
- Benito Saint Plumero, or Bigfoot: One of the pilgrims. He is a mixedblood clown/trickster whose major source of pride is a gigantic and very active penis, dubbed President Jackson. He is canonized and made a “double saint” on the journey.
- Belladonna Darwin-Winter Catcher: A pilgrim, the daughter of a Lakota shaman and a white anthropologist. She was born at Wounded Knee, South Dakota and holds strong views associated with what Vizenor calls "terminal creeds".
- Bishop Omax Parasimo: Responsible for the rescue of Inawa. He wears meta masks that allow him to become Sister Eternal Flame and other characters of all genders. He is obsessed with the romantic image of "Indianness" of the type propagated by Hollywood.
- Lillith Mae: A white woman and pilgrim who travels with her two boxers. She first engages in sexual intercourse with the two dogs while teaching on a reservation. She is also the first to gamble with the Evil Gambler, and because she does not know the rituals of balance and power, she loses and destroys herself.
- Pio Wissakodewinini: Another pilgrim, who has been falsely accused of rape and was sentenced to undergo sex reassignment surgery, which was not entirely successful. S/he shifts identities and gender often during the journey.
- Sun Bear Sun: The largest pilgrim, weighing three hundred pounds and standing seven feet tall. He is the son of a utopian tribal organizer by the name of Sun Bear.
- Doctor Wilde Coxwaine: A pilgrim and bisexual tribal historian. He and Justice Pardone Cozener are entranced by the Bioavaricious Word Hospital and leave the remaining pilgrims to remain there.
- Justice Pardone Cozener: A pilgrim and illiterate law school graduate, one of the “bigbellies” who are fleecing the tribes and the government. He is in love with Doctor Wilde Coxwaine.
- Matchi Makwa: A minor pilgrim who complains about the loss of “Indian racial purity.”

== Structure ==
According to Bernadette Rigel-Cellard, the novel is embedded with an array of adventures while still sticking to the pilgrimage-like structure. It can also be understood as a “road novel” with hints of irony and an archetype of the classic pilgrim story. Rigel-Cellard states the novel should be viewed as a reference to classic pilgrim-type novels, such as that of Boccacio’s Decamaron, Chaucer’s The Canterbury Tales, and John Bunyan’s "The Pilgrim's Progress". The novel’s structure can also be attributed to the postmodern philosophy within the novel; Elizabeth Blair recalls Vizenor's comment that searching for meaning can only be applied when the reader accepts the absurd reality of Bearheart. Michael Wilson points to how the novel combines two different narrative forms; the first is the Indigenous four-worlds narrative, while the second is a linear narrative of American expansion. These two seemingly opposing narratives come to a collective at the end of the novel.

According to Jill Doerfler, the quest, pilgrimage, or road narrative genre of Bearheart is meant to aid the reader in understanding the repeated use of satire, as a means to critique rapid industrialization, particularly in American society and culture. In understanding the structure, the direction of the narration and who the subject of focalization is becomes important. Doerfler also observes how many of the characters in the novel are embodiments of archetypes that Vizenor wants to both explore and bring attention to. For example, the character Bigfoot, a trickster, represents the sexual desires of man. The protagonist Proude is also a trickster; however, he represents a more leadership-focused interpretation of that same archetype.

== Setting ==
The setting of Bearheart is a post-apocalyptic United States. Due to a national gas shortage the country has been thrown into chaos. Bernadette Rigel-Cellard speaks to how the novel utilizes its setting to establish important themes such as the loss of morality in the post-apocalypse. The original setting the novel takes place in is that of the land of the sacred cedar trees, which Proude and Rosina Cedarfair are later forced to abandon due to orders from the government. They pick up various mixed-blood Indigenous people on their journey through various locations in the United States, meaning the narrative is not tied to any one location. The novel mirrors and is influenced by various Indigenous traditional stories, while placing the band of characters in a modern context, as Rigel-Cellard points out.

== Themes ==
The major themes of Gerald Vizenor's Bearheart are meant to introduce the audience to an array of Native concepts, while simultaneously alienating the constructed view of Indigenous stereotypes. The most recurring themes in the novel are those of terminal creeds, industrialization and violence, and the trickster archetype.

=== Terminal creeds ===
In an interview with Neal Bowers, Gerald Vizenor talks about his personal experiences with tribal culture and thinks of it as a balance, rather than a terminal creed. This concept of "terminal creeds" refers to the idea that individuals and even groups of people can adopt ideas about the world and themselves that are incapable of change. Vizenor warns the readers of Bearheart against this belief system, specifically tackling the idea of the "invented Indian." The character Bella-Donna is representative of what Vizenor warns readers against. Bernadette Rigel-Cellard describes Bella-Donna's fate as a consequence of her failing to understand what it actually means to be Native American and instead subscribing to the idea of the "invented Indian," a terminal creed.

=== Industrialization and violence ===
Lee Rozelle states how Bearheart, being a post-apocalyptic novel, also addresses themes of industrialization and climate health. The “society” that Bearheart puts the reader in is one of humans committing acts of violence towards each other, where Indigenous reservations become places of solace and shelter from the post-apocalyptic world waiting for them outside. Rozelle expresses how this can be seen as a critique of private land and rapid industrialization that brought on this apocalypse. Rozelle also speaks to how the novel proposes a possibility of what industrialization and climate disaster can bring on, being the amount of severe violence that the book contains. Mohsen Hanif and Sheiki Zahra allude to how even the violence itself is a thematic tool. The repeated violence is meant to make readers question why the violence is so overlooked and causal within the novel. Christopher Schedler speaks of the violence in Bearheart as a tool for deconstructing the idea of an “Indian” identity. An example of this idea of violence as a thematic tool, as Jeff Berglund states, is the novel's use of cannibalism to represent American consumerism. Jill Doerfler acknowledges how the use of a classical dystopia emphasizes a look at contemporary society and the collective treatment of the environment. Lee Rozelle states how this concept of a dystopia brought on by environmental factors, particularly in industrialized and consumer-focused societies, can be referred to as “post-ecocidal decentralization.”

=== Trickster archetype ===
The usage of a trickster is also an important thematic tool that is prevalent in Bearheart, according to Mohsen Hanif and Sheiki Zahra Several members of the group fit within the trickster archetype, including the protagonist Proude Cedarfair. The humor within the novel is extremely prevalent and is a key aspect to many of the trickster characters. Hanif and Zahra argue that the humor and severe violence in the novel lead to a paradoxical understanding of what it means to be Native American. The many different Native American characters in the novel all have different and distinctive personalities that make them unable to be essentialized on the basis of their identity. Kimberly Blaeser points to how Vizenor intertwines the trickster archetype into his autobiographies, showing how he is heavily influenced by the use of a trickster as a literary tool.

== Reception ==
=== Positive ===
Bearheart, despite the controversy surrounding the text, is given much praise by literature scholars, like Helmbrecht Breinig, who acknowledge the complexity of themes and use of literary devices, such as satire. Elizabeth Cook-Lynn gives credit to Vizenor with his contributions to conversations concerning mixedbloods. Jace Weaver states that Vizenor’s work is notable, specifically for his ideas around “Native identity.” Elizabeth Blair acknowledges how Bearheart takes the risk of using old myths to tell stories in a contemporary society and how it speaks to combating stereotypes in the modern world while asking the question of what it means to be a Native American in contemporary America.

=== Negative ===
Bearheart is a controversial novel with depictions of sex and violence throughout the text. Terry Cochran, a senior editor at the University of Minnesota Press, relayed to Vizenor that the contract printer refused to continue production of the new edition of Bearheart. Elaine Kim, former chair of the Department of Ethnic Studies at the University of California, Berkeley, pushed for a display case containing Kimberly Blaeser's Shadow Distance: A Gerald Vizenor Reader to be removed due to an androgynous nude trickster being on the cover of the book, a reference to Bearheart. The afterword of the novel, written by Louis Owens, talks about his own experiences with controversy when teaching this novel, having been reported to the dean by multiple students. Vizenor, despite the controversy over his book, still expresses the idea that “some upsetting is necessary”. Blaeser also speaks on how the typesetters for the original manuscript Darkness in Saint Louis Bearheart were uncooperative about working on this novel, due to the violence and vulgarity within the text. The sexual violence and presence of "transsexual Indians" were also factors as to why the book was so controversial. To the repeated criticism and outrage that Vizenor has had levied towards him and his work, Vizenor asks readers of Bearheart to point to anything in the novel that does not bear true.
