= A Good Day to Die (film) =

- Directed by: David Mueller
- Written by: Lynn Salt
- Starring: Dennis Banks; Charlie Hill; Jerry Brown; Larry Anderson
- Release date: November 12, 2010 (Denver International Film Festival)
- Country: United States
- Language: English

A Good Day to Die is a 2010 American documentary film about American Indian Movement founder Dennis Banks.

The title of film comes from the phrase "a good day to die" which Banks quoted during a speech at a protest in Custer, South Dakota.
