= Neal Bowers =

American poet, novelist and scholar

Neal Bowers (born Larry Neal Bowers, August 3, 1948 in Clarksville, Tennessee) is an American poet, novelist, memoirist, and scholar. He received the B.A. (1970) and M.A. (1971) from Austin Peay State University and the Ph.D. in English and American Literature from the University of Florida (1976). He taught for thirty-one years at Iowa State University, earning the highest academic rank awarded by the university, Distinguished Professor. His regular courses included creative writing and modern and contemporary poetry. He retired from teaching in 2008.

In addition to his poetry, Bowers is best known for his defense of poetry in Words for the Taking: The Hunt for a Plagiarist (W.W. Norton, 1997). As the victim of a bizarre and relentless literary thief, Bowers made a stand for intellectual property and the deeply personal nature of the creative process at a time when fewer and fewer scholars and writers believed in either. After publishing several articles expressing his dismay, most notably University Poetry, Inc. (Poetry, July 2002), Bowers stopped writing poetry for more than a decade. Prior to that hiatus, he published hundreds of poems in such journals as Poetry, The New Yorker, Sewanee Review, Hudson Review, Shenandoah, and Virginia Quarterly Review, and his work was represented in over three dozen anthologies.

== Books ==
- Theodore Roethke: The Journey from I to Otherwise (biographical criticism) Univ. of Missouri Press, 1982.
- The Golf Ball Diver (poetry) New Rivers Press, 1983.
- James Dickey: The Poet as Pitchman (criticism) Univ. of Missouri Press, 1985.
- Lost in the Heartland (poetry) Cedar Creek Press, 1990.
- Night Vision (poetry) BkMk Press, 1992.
- Words for the Taking: The Hunt for a Plagiarist (nonfiction) W.W. Norton, 1997; reprint & update Southern Illinois Univ. Press, 2007.
- Loose Ends (novel) Random House, 2001.
- Out of the South (poetry) LSU Press, 2002.
- Cats Rule: The Bookstore Cat's Guide to the Care and Training of Humans (whimsy) BookSurge, 2009.

== Awards ==
- Poetry Prize (Society of Midland Authors): Best book of poetry in 2002 for Out of the South.
- Union League Civic and Arts Poetry Prize (from Poetry), 1996.
- Frederick Bock Prize (from Poetry), 1991.
- National Endowment for the Arts Fellowship in Poetry, 1989.

== Personal life ==
Neal Bowers and his wife, Nancy, have lived in the same house in Ames, Iowa, for thirty years. In younger days, they traveled extensively but are now content to pursue their various writing projects with the assistance of six special-needs cats.
