= Griever: An American Monkey King in China =

Novel by Gerald Vizenor

- Author: Gerald Vizenor
- Language: English
- Publication date: 1986

Griever: An American Monkey King in China is a 1986 novel by Gerald Vizenor. It won the 1986 New York Fiction Collective Award, and the 1988 American Book Award. The book is important both because it establishes the trickster figure of Griever de Hocus, whom Vizenor had created in his 1985 story "Luminous Thighs" and whom he would use again in The Trickster of Liberty, and because Vizenor takes Native American stories and themes outside the Americas and into China, establishing a connection to Chinese trickster figures, most notably Sun Wukong the Monkey King.

Based partly on Vizenor's own experiences as a visiting professor in China, the novel follows mixed-blood Griever de Hocus as he takes up a teaching position in Tianjin. While there, Griever makes numerous connections between Native American history and the neocolonialism he sees occurring in communist China; for instance, by giving his pet rooster the name Matteo Ricci, Vizenor connects the Westernization process in China with the political and religious colonization of the Americas. Along the way, Griever casts himself as a modern Monkey King, proclaiming liberation to the Chinese and joining up with modernized versions of the Monkey King's companions.
