= Arnold Krupat =

American academic

Arnold Krupat (born 1941) is an American academic who is a retired emeritus professor of literature at Sarah Lawrence College in Bronxville, New York. His academic work focuses on Native American literature and is informed by critical theory. Among his known books are For Those Who Come After: A Study of Native American Autobiography (1985), The Voice in the Margin: Native American Literature and the Canon (1989), Ethnocriticism: Ethnography, History, Literature (1992) and The Turn to the Native (1996).

== Youth and education ==
Krupat was born in 1941 in the Bronx, New York and grew up in the Jacob Riis Housing Projects on the lower east side of Manhattan. He went to public grade school and then to Stuyvesant High School, from which he graduated in 1958.

He attended New York University's Washington Square College of Arts and Science on scholarship, earning his bachelor's degree summa cum laude and Phi Beta Kappa in 1962. From 1962 to 1963, he spent a year at the Universite de Strasbourg on a Fulbright Fellowship. After returning to New York, he entered graduate school at Columbia University on a Woodrow Wilson Foundation Fellowship. He received his Ph.D. from Columbia with honors in 1967.

== Academic career ==
From 1965 to 1968, Krupat taught in the English Department at Rutgers University in New Brunswick, New Jersey. He started teaching at Sarah Lawrence College in Bronxville, New York in 1968, and retired, with emeritate, in 2012.

== Scholarly works ==
=== Native American literary studies ===
Krupat's early publications focused primarily on American literature and literary criticism, but during the late 1970s and early 1980s his research increasingly turned to Indigenous literature and the history of Native American textual production. He argued that Native writing should be studied as literature rather than treated primarily as ethnographic or folkloric material. His approach combined literary criticism with anthropology, history, and ethnography, while also examining the circumstances in which Indigenous narratives were recorded, translated, and edited by non-Native intermediaries.

This work culminated in For Those Who Come After: A Study of Native American Autobiography (1985), which examined Indigenous life narratives as literary works shaped by intercultural processes of storytelling, transcription, translation, and editing. Krupat's approach helped establish Native American autobiography as an important field within American literary studies.

=== Ethnocriticism ===
During the 1980s and 1990s, Krupat developed ethnocriticism, an approach to the study of texts produced across cultural boundaries. He brought together literary criticism, anthropology, history, and Indigenous perspectives to examine how cultural representations are shaped by differing systems of knowledge and by historical relations of power.

His book Ethnocriticism: Ethnography, History, Literature (1992) developed this approach through discussions of ethnographic writing, Native American autobiography, historical representation, and literary texts. Krupat emphasized the need to consider both the cultural traditions through which texts are produced and the political and historical circumstances in which they are interpreted.

=== The synecdochic self ===
One of Krupat's best-known concepts is the synecdochic self, which he developed in his work on Native American autobiography. The concept describes forms of autobiographical representation in which the individual is understood in relation to a larger community, including family, kinship networks, cultural traditions, and collective history. Krupat contrasted this model with Western traditions of autobiography that frequently emphasize the autonomous individual.

He also cautioned against treating Native American communities as culturally uniform, and his concept has subsequently been discussed and debated by scholars of Indigenous autobiography and literary studies.

== Editorial work ==
Krupat also contributed to the incorporation of Native American writing into the study and teaching of American literature through his editorial work. He edited or co-edited collections including Native American Autobiography: An Anthology, Recovering the Word, New Voices in Native American Literary Criticism, and Here First: Autobiographical Essays by Native American Writers.

He also served as the Native American literature editor for editions of The Norton Anthology of American Literature. Through this work, he contributed to the inclusion of Native American authors and texts within widely used American-literature curricula and to broader discussions of the American literary canon.

== Later academic work ==
After retiring from full-time teaching in 2012, Krupat continued publishing on Indigenous autobiography, American Indian boarding-school literature, and Native American literary history. His two-volume Changed Forever: American Indian Boarding-School Literature examines autobiographical and other writings by Native Americans who attended government-run boarding schools. Volume I was published in 2018 by the State University of New York Press, and focuses particularly on Hopi, Navajo, and Apache boarding-school autobiographies. Volume II followed in 2020 and examines autobiographical writings by figures including Charles Eastman, Luther Standing Bear, Zitkala-Sa, Walter Littlemoon, Adam Fortunate Eagle, Reuben Snake, and Edna Manitowabi.

Krupat subsequently published Boarding School Voices: Carlisle Indian School Students Speak in 2021 with the University of Nebraska Press. The book combines an anthology of largely unpublished writings by former students of the Carlisle Indian Industrial School with analysis of the students' accounts. It draws particularly on letters, questionnaires, school publications, and other records documenting students' experiences during and after their time at Carlisle.

These later works extended Krupat's longstanding interest in Indigenous autobiography and intercultural textual production by examining first-person writings produced within and following the federal Indian boarding-school system. Rather than presenting the students solely as victims of assimilation, his studies also consider their agency, adaptations, relationships to their communities, and responses to the circumstances they encountered.

In 1989, he published a novel, Woodsmen, or Thoreau & the Indians, and in 2012 What-to-do? a novel. He has also authored, edited, or co-edited 12 more books. His most recent publications are Changed Forever: American Indian Boarding-School Literature, volume 1 published in 2018, and volume 2, 2020. Boarding School Voices: Carlisle Indian Students Speak published in 2021.

== Fellowships ==
Krupat is a recipient of six fellowships from the National Endowment for the Humanities. In 2007, he was the recipient of the Sarah Lawrence Excellence in Teaching Award.

- 1962: Fulbright Fellowship
- 1963: Woodrow Wilson Foundation Fellowship
- 2005: Guggenheim Fellowship

== Published works ==
- For Those Who Come After: A Study of Native American Autobiography, University of California Press, 1989. ISBN 978-0-520-06606-9
- The Voice in the Margin: Native American Literature and the Canon, University of California Press, 1989. ISBN 978-0-520-06669-4
- Ethnocriticism: Ethnography, History, Literature, University of California Press, 1992. ISBN 978-0-520-07666-2
- Woodsmen, or Thoreau and the Indians, University of Oklahoma Press, 1994. ISBN 978-0-8061-2671-5
- The Turn to the Native: Studies in Criticism and Culture, Bison Books, 1998. ISBN 0-8032-7786-5
- Red Matters: Native American Studies (Rethinking the Americas), University of Pennsylvania Press, 2002. ISBN 978-0-8122-1803-9
- Norton Anthology of American Literature (editor, with Nima Baym, Wayne Franklin, Philip F. Gura and Robert S. Levine), New York: Norton, 2007. ISBN 978-0-393-92993-5
- All That Remains: Varieties of Indigenous Expression , University of Nebraska Press, 2009. ISBN 978-0-8032-1890-1
- That the People Might Live: Loss and Renewal in Native American Elegy, Cornell University Press, 2012.
- Companion to James Welch's The Heartsong of Charging Elk (editor), University of Nebraska Press, 2015.
- Boarding School Voices: Carlisle Indian School Students Speak. University of Nebraska Press. 2021. ISBN 978-1-4962-2801-7.
