= Gerald Vizenor =

American writer (born 1934)

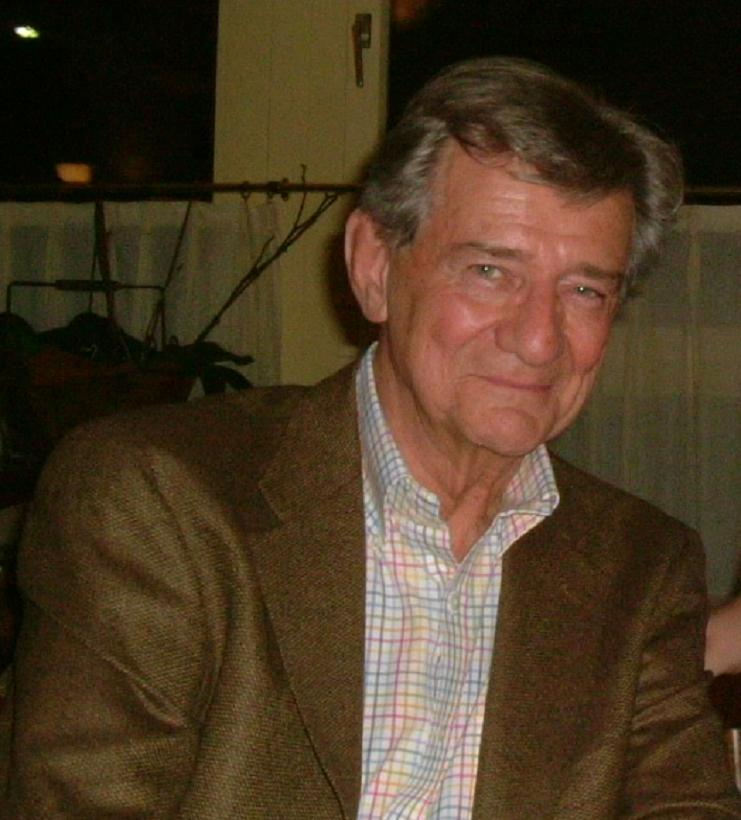
- Gerald Vizenor in Geneva, 2000
- Born: Gerald Robert Vizenor; 1934 (age 91–92); Minneapolis, Minnesota, U.S.
- Occupations: Writer; literary critic; professor; ethnographer
- Writing career
- Genres: Anishinaabe traditional, haiku
- Notable works: Interior Landscapes, Manifest Manners, Darkness in Saint Louis Bearheart
- Literary movement: Postmodernism, Native American Renaissance
- Website: www.hanksville.org/storytellers/vizenor/

Gerald Robert Vizenor (born 1934) is an American writer and scholar, and an enrolled member of the Minnesota Chippewa Tribe, White Earth Reservation. Vizenor also taught for many years at the University of California, Berkeley, where he was Director of Native American Studies. With more than 30 books published, Vizenor is Professor Emeritus at the University of California, Berkeley, and Professor of American Studies at the University of New Mexico.

== Early life ==
Gerald Vizenor was born to a mother who was Swedish-American and a father who was Anishinaabe. When he was less than two years old, his father was murdered in a homicide that was never solved. He was raised by his mother and paternal Anishinaabe grandmother, along with a succession of paternal uncles, in Minneapolis and on the White Earth Reservation. His mother's partner acted as his informal stepfather and primary caregiver. Following that man's death in 1950, Vizenor lied about his age and at 15 entered the Minnesota National Guard.

Honorably discharged before his unit went to Korea, Vizenor joined the army two years later. He served with occupation forces in Japan, with that nation was still struggling to recover from the vast destruction of the nuclear attacks that ended World War II. During this period, he began to learn about the Japanese poetic form of haiku. Later he wrote Hiroshima Bugi (2003), what he called his "kabuki novel."

Returning to the United States in 1953, Vizenor took advantage of G.I. Bill funding to complete his undergraduate degree at New York University. He followed this with postgraduate study at Harvard University and the University of Minnesota, where he also undertook graduate teaching. After returning to Minnesota, he married and had a son.

== Activism ==
After teaching at the university, between 1964 and 1968, Vizenor worked as a community advocate. During this time, he served as director of the American Indian Employment and Guidance Center in Minneapolis, Minnesota, which brought him into close contact with numerous Native Americans from reservations. Many found it difficult to live in the city, and struggled against white racism and cheap alcohol.

This period is the subject of his short-story collection Wordarrows: Whites and Indians in the New Fur Trade, some of which was inspired by his experiences. His work with homeless and poor Natives may have been the reason Vizenor looked askance at the emerging American Indian Movement (AIM), seeing radical leaders such as Dennis Banks and Clyde Bellecourt as being more concerned with personal publicity than the "real" problems faced by American Indians.

Vizenor began working as a staff reporter for the Minneapolis Tribune, quickly rising to become an editorial contributor. He investigated the case of Thomas James White Hawk, convicted of a 1967 Vermillion, South Dakota murder and sentenced to death. Vizenor's writings on the case explored the nature of justice in a society dealing with colonized peoples. His work was credited with enabling White Hawk to have his death sentence commuted.

During this period Vizenor coined the phrase "cultural schizophrenia" to describe the state of mind of many Natives, who he considered torn between Native and White cultures. His investigative journalism into American Indian activists revealed drug dealing, personal failings, and failures of leadership among some of the movement's leaders. As a consequence of his articles, he was personally threatened.

== Academic career ==
Beginning teaching full-time at Lake Forest College, Illinois, between 1970 and 1972, Vizenor was appointed to set up and run the Native American Studies program at Bemidji State University. Later he became professor of American Indian Studies at the University of Minnesota in Minneapolis (1978–1985). He later satirized the academic world in some of his fiction. For example, in "The Chair of Tears", in Earthdivers. During this time he also served as a visiting professor at Tianjin University, China.

Vizenor worked and taught for four years at the University of California, Santa Cruz, where he was also Provost of Kresge College. He had an endowed chair for one year at the University of Oklahoma. Vizenor next was appointed as a professor at the University of California, Berkeley. He is professor of American Studies at the University of New Mexico.

Vizenor was influenced by the French post-modernist intellectuals, particularly Jacques Derrida and Jean Baudrillard.

== Fiction ==
Vizenor has published collections of haiku, poems, plays, short stories, translations of traditional tribal tales, screenplays, and many novels. He has been named as a member of the literary movement which Kenneth Lincoln dubbed the Native American Renaissance, a flourishing of literature and art beginning in the mid-20th century.

== Non-fiction ==
Vizenor has written several studies of Native American affairs, including Manifest Manners and Fugitive Poses. He has edited several collections of academic work related to Native American writing. He is the founder-editor of the American Indian Literature and Critical Studies series at the University of Oklahoma Press, which has provided an important venue for critical work on and by Native writers.

In his own studies, Vizenor has worked to deconstruct the semiotics of Indianness. His title, Fugitive Poses is derived from Vizenor's assertion that the term Indian is a social-science construction that replaces native peoples, who become absent or "fugitive". Similarly, the term, "manifest manners," refers to the continued legacy of Manifest Destiny. He wrote that native peoples were still bound by "narratives of dominance" that replace them with "Indians". In place of a unified "Indian" signifier, he suggests that Native peoples be referred to by specific tribal identities, to be properly placed in their particular tribal context, just as most Americans would distinguish among the French, Poles, Germans and English.

In order to cover more general Native studies, Vizenor suggests using the term, "postindian," to convey that the disparate, heterogeneous tribal cultures were "unified" and could be addressed en masse only by Euro-American attitudes and actions towards them. He has also promoted the neologism of "survivance", a cross between the words "survival" and "resistance." He uses it to replace "survival" in terms of tribal peoples. He coined it to imply a process rather than an end, as the ways of tribal peoples continue to change (as do the ways of others). He also notes that the survival of tribal peoples as distinct from majority cultures, is based in resistance.

He continues to criticize both Native American nationalism and Euro-American colonial attitudes.

== Honors ==
Both his fiction and academic studies have contributed to his being honored as a major Anishinaabe and American intellectual and writer.

- 1983, Film-in-the-Cities Award, Sundance Festival
- 1984, Best American Indian Film, San Francisco Film Festival
- 1986, New York Fiction Collective Award
- 1988, American Book Award for
- 1988, New York Fiction Collective Prize
- 1989, Artists Fellowship in Literature, California Arts Council, 1989
- 1990, PEN Oakland/Josephine Miles Literary Award
- 1996, PEN Excellence Award
- 2001, Lifetime Achievement Award, Native Writers' Circle of the Americas
- 2005, Distinguished Achievement Award, Western Literature Association
- 2005, Distinguished Minnesotan, Bemidji State University
- 2011, MELUS Lifetime Achievement Award, 2011.
- 2011, American Book Award for Shrouds of White Earth (2011).
- 2020, Lifetime Achievement Award, Paul Bartlett Re Peace Prize
- 2021, Honorary Curator, American Haiku Archives

== Selected works ==
=== Fiction ===
- Blue Ravens. Wesleyan University Press. 2014. ISBN 978-0-8195-7416-9.
- Shrouds of White Earth (SUNY P)
- Father Meme (University of New Mexico Press)
- Hiroshima Bugi: Atomu 57 (Nebraska UP)
- Chancers (Oklahoma UP)
- Hotline Healers: An Almost Browne Novel (Wesleyan UP)
- Bearheart: The Heirship Chronicles (Minnesota UP) (revised version of Darkness in Saint Louis Bearheart)
- The Heirs of Columbus (Wesleyan UP)
- Griever: An American Monkey King in China (Minnesota UP)
- The Trickster of Liberty: Tribal Heirs to a Wild Baronage (Emergent Literatures)
- Earthdivers: Tribal Narratives on Mixed Descent. University of Minnesota Press. 1981. ISBN 978-0-8166-1048-8. JSTOR 10.5749/j.ctttsxm5.
  - From the section "Earthdivers in Higher Education" (pp. 3–67): "Chair of Tears". Earthdivers: Tribal Narratives on Mixed Descent. University of Minnesota Press. 1981. pp. 3–30. ISBN 978-0-8166-1048-8. JSTOR 10.5749/j.ctttsxm5.5.
- Landfill Meditation: Crossblood Stories (Wesleyan UP)
- Dead Voices: Natural Agonies in the New World (University of Oklahoma Press)
- Chair of Tears. Bison. 2012. ISBN 978-0-8032-3840-4.; Chair of Tears. Lincoln (US): University of Nebraska Press. 2012. ISBN 978-0-8032-3840-4.

=== Non-fiction ===
- Thomas James Whitehawk: Investigative Narrative in the Trial, Capital Punishment, and Commutation of the Death Sentence of Thomas James Whitehawk (Four Winds Press, 1968)
- The Everlasting Sky; New Voices from the People Named the Chippewa (MacMillan, 1972)
- Wordarrows: Indians and Whites in the New Fur Trade (U of Minnesota P, 1978)
- The People Named the Chippewa: Narrative Histories (U of Minnesota P, 1984)
- Touchwood : A Collection of Ojibway Prose (Many Minnesotas Project, No 3) (New Rivers Press, 1987)
- Crossbloods; Bone Courts, Bingo, and Other Reports (U of Minnesota P, 1990)
- Manifest Manners: Postindian Warriors of Survivance (Wesleyan UP, 1993)
- Shadow Distance: A Gerald Vizenor Reader (Wesleyan UP, 1994) - essays, fiction, poetry
- Fugitive Poses: Native American Indian Scenes of Absence and Presence (Nebraska UP, 1998)
- Native Liberty: Natural Reason and Cultural Survivance (Nebraska UP, 2009)

=== Poetry ===
- Poems Born in the Wind (1960)
- The Old Park Sleepers (1961)
- Two Wings the Butterfly (privately printed, 1962)
- South of the Painted Stones (1963)
- Summer in the Spring: Anishinaabe Lyric Poems and Stories (Oklahoma UP)
- Slight Abrasions: A Dialogue in Haiku, with Jerome Downes (Nodin Press, 1966)
- Water Striders (Moving Parts Press)
- Seventeen Chirps (Nodin Press)
- Raising the Moon Vines (Nodin Press)
- Matsushima : Pine Island (Nodin Press, 1984)
- Cranes Arise: Haiku Scenes (Nodin Press, 1999)
- Empty Swings (Haiku in English Series) (Nodin Press)
- Bear Island: The War at Sugar Point (Minnesota UP, 2006)
- Almost Ashore (Salt Publishing, 2006)
  - Published in translation as:
  - Quasi en Terra (in Catalan). Translated by Carme Manuel Cuenca. Valencia: Denes. 2009. ISBN 9788496545922.

=== Plays and screenplays ===
- Harold of Orange (1984)
- Ishi and the wood ducks – a four-act play on the story of Ishi, a Yahi man whose ethnographic information and retellings of his people's folk takes were audio-recorded in 1915. The play has been published in: Gerald Vizenor, ed. (1995). Native American literature: A brief introduction and anthology. New York: HarperCollins College Publishers. pp. 299–336. ISBN 9780673469786.

=== Edited anthology ===
- Native American Literature: A Brief Introduction and Anthology (1997)

=== Edited collections of essays ===
- Narrative Chance: Postmodern Discourse on Native American Indian Literatures (Oklahoma UP)
- Survivance: Narratives of Native Presence (Nebraska UP, 2008)

=== Autobiography ===
- Interior Landscapes: Autobiographical Myths and Metaphors. Minnesota (U.S.): University of Minnesota Press. 1990. pp. 28–32. ISBN 978-0-8166-1848-4.
- With Lee, A. Robert (1999). Postindian conversations. Lincoln, Nebraska (U.S.): University of Nebraska Press. ISBN 978-0-8032-9628-2.

== See also ==
- List of thinkers influenced by deconstruction
