= Afro-Indigenous (disambiguation) =

Afro-Indigenous may refer to:

- Afro-Indigenous peoples – Ethnic groups with both Black and Indigenous American ethnicity and identity.
- Afro-Indigenous people in Canada – People in Canada of combined African and Indigenous ancestry and identity
- Black Indians in the United States – Americans with both Indigenous American and Black identities
  - Black Seminoles – Ethnic group
  - Native American Freedmen – Descendants of people of African descent who were enslaved
    - Cherokee Freedmen – People formerly enslaved in the Cherokee Nation and descendants
    - Chickasaw Freedmen – Formerly enslaved African Americans
    - Choctaw Freedmen – Afro-Indigenous ethnocultural group subject to long-term tribal membership dispute
    - Muscogee Freedmen – Muscogee formerly enslaved people and their descendants
- Garifuna – Indigenous ethnicity in Central America
- Mascogos – Afrodescendent group in Coahuila, Mexico
- Miskito Sambu – Ethnic group to Mosquitia, Central America

== See also ==
- Indo-African (disambiguation)
