= Afro-Indigenous peoples =

Ethnic groups that are both Black and Indigenous

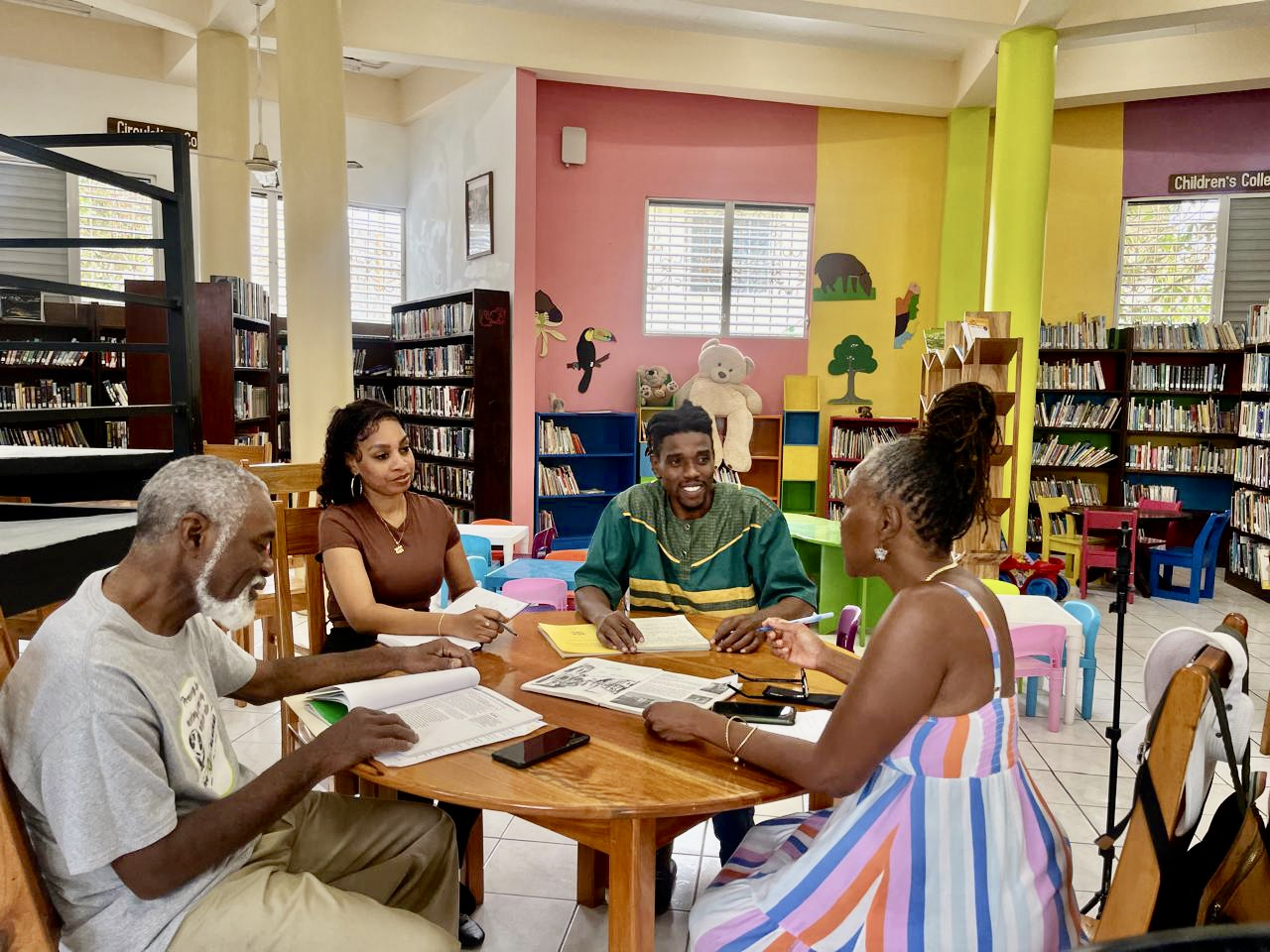
Garínagu studying historical documents in Belize.

Afro-Indigenous peoples, or Black Indigenous peoples, are ethnic groups in the Americas that are both Black and Indigenous.

== Background ==
Afro-Indigenous peoples can have Native American ancestry or kin ties. Others were adopted into pre-existing tribes throughout the Americas. Afro-Indigenous peoples can experience Anti-Black racism due to their appearance, and can also feel ostracized from Indigenous communities.

Some Afro-Indigenous peoples are the Garínagu, the Afro-Seminoles, and a portion of the Miskito.

== See also ==
- Afro-Indigenous people in Canada
- Black Indians in the United States
- Zambo and Pardo
- Mascogos
- Native American Freedmen
  - Cherokee Freedmen
  - Chickasaw Freedmen
  - Choctaw Freedmen
  - Muscogee Freedmen

== Bibliography ==
- Mollett, Sharlene (2006). "Race and Natural Resource Conflicts in Honduras: The Miskito and Garifuna Struggle for Lasa Pulan". Latin American Research Review. 41 (1). Austin, TX: University of Texas Press: 76–101. doi:10.1353/lar.2006.0012.
- Herlighy, Laura Hobson (2007). "Sexual Magic and Money: Miskitu Women's Strategies in Northern Honduras". Ethnology. 45 (2). Pittsburgh, PA. ISSN 0014-1828 – via KU ScholarWorks.
- Wade, Peter (24 April 2018). "Afro-Indigenous Interactions, Relations, and Comparisons". In de la Fuente, Alejandro (ed.). Afro-Latin American Studies: An Introduction. Cambridge, UK: Cambridge University Press. ISBN 9781316822883.
