= Native American Freedmen =

Descendants of people of African descent who were enslaved

Freedmen
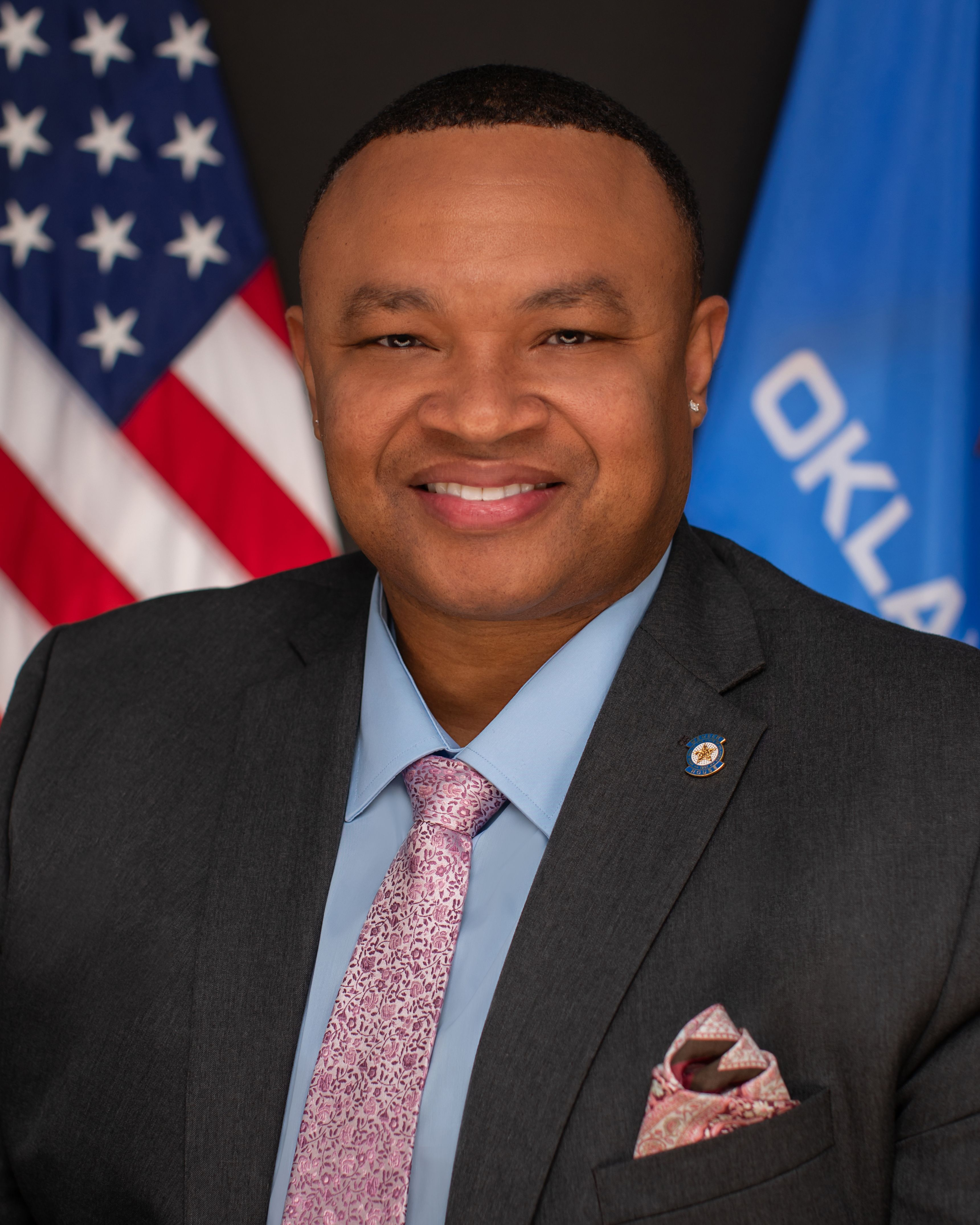
- Ronald Stewart, a politician of Creek Freedmen descent

Regions with significant populations
- Oklahoma and Texas, United States; Coahuila, Mexico; Andros Island, Bahamas

Languages
- American English, African American Vernacular English, Mexican Spanish, Afro-Seminole Creole

Religion
- Diverse

Related ethnic groups
- Mascogos, Cherokee Freedmen, Black Seminoles, Chickasaw Freedmen, Muscogee Freedmen, Choctaw Freedmen, African Americans, Louisiana Creoles of Color, Seminoles, Choctaw, Chickasaw, Cherokee, Muscogee

The term Freedmen refers to descendants of people of African American descent who were enslaved by what are known as the Five Civilized Tribes. As sovereign nations within the United States, each tribe is at liberty to define their relationship to their Freedmen, with some allowing Freedmen petitions for enrollment in the tribe, and others explicitly forbidding the enrollment of Freedmen or outright disenrolling any that had historically at one point been enrolled. The Chickasaw Nation has never enrolled their enslaved. The term is also applied to those who are descended from those enslaved African descendants who voluntarily joined and/or held kinship with the Seminole Nation, including those who had fled from the Seminole Nation when it adopted the practice of slavery, to Mexico — these people today being known as Mascogos.) The term Freedmen is sometimes applied in literature as encompassing both the enslaved and emancipated, as well as either class' descendants.

Freedmen, both enslaved and free, who were amongst these tribes, were forcibly deported alongside members of the tribes from the now-Southeastern United States westward to Oklahoma along the Trail of Tears.

== See also ==
- Amerindian slave ownership
- Black Indians in the United States
- Black Seminoles
- Cherokee Freedmen
- Chickasaw Freedmen
- Choctaw Freedmen
- Muscogee Freedmen
