= Black Indians in the United States =

Americans with both Indigenous American and Black identities

Black Indians (American Indian with African ancestry)
Total population
- True population unknown, 392,853 identified as ethnically mixed with African and Native American on 2020 census

Regions with significant populations
- United States (especially the Southern United States or in locations populated by Southern descendants), Oklahoma, Louisiana, Pennsylvania, New York, Connecticut, Massachusetts, and Rhode Island).

Languages
- American English, Louisiana French, Louisiana Creole, Gullah, Tutnese, Afro-Seminole Creole, Native American languages (including Navajo, Dakota, Cherokee, Choctaw, Mvskoke, Ojibwe), African languages Pidgin English

Related ethnic groups
- African Americans; West Indian Americans; Black Seminoles; Garifuna Americans; Indigenous peoples of the Americas; Miskito Sambu; Native American Freedmen

Black Indians are Native American people of African American heritage, or person of African American descent with strong cultural ties to Native American communities.

Historically, certain Native American tribes have had close relations with African Americans, especially in regions where slavery was prevalent or where free people of color have historically resided. Members of the Five Civilized Tribes (Cherokee, Chickasaw, Choctaw, Muscogee and Seminole) participated in holding enslaved African Americans in the Southeast and some enslaved or formerly enslaved people migrated with them to the West on the Trail of Tears in 1830 and later during the period of Indian Removal. Black ancestry is also common among some federally recognized tribes in the Northeast, including the Mashantucket Pequot Tribe, the Mashpee Wampanoag Tribe, the Narragansett Indian Tribe, the Shinnecock Indian Nation, and the Wampanoag Tribe of Gay Head.

In controversial actions, since the late 20th century, the Cherokee Nation, Choctaw Nation, Muscogee Nation, and Seminole Nation of Oklahoma tightened their rules for membership and at times excluded Freedmen who did not have at least one ancestor listed as Native American by blood on the early 20th-century Dawes Rolls. This exclusion was later appealed in the courts, both because of the treaty conditions and in some cases because of possible inaccuracies in some of the Rolls. The Chickasaw Nation never extended citizenship to Chickasaw Freedmen.

== Overview ==
Until recently, historic relations between Native Americans and African Americans were relatively neglected in mainstream United States history studies. Over time, Africans had varying degrees of contact with Native Americans, although they did not live together in as great number as with Europeans. Enslaved Africans brought to the United States, as well as their descendants, have had a history of cultural exchange and intermarriage with Native Americans, as well as with other enslaved mixed-race persons who had some Native American and European ancestry.

Most such interaction took place in New England, where contact was established early, and in the Southern United States, where the largest number of African-descended people were enslaved. In the 21st century, a significant number of African Americans have some Native American ancestry, but most have not grown up within those cultures and lack current social, cultural or linguistic ties to Native peoples.

Relationships among different Native Americans, Africans, and African Americans have been varied and complex. Native peoples often disagreed about the role of ethnic African people in their communities. Some tribes or bands were more accepting of ethnic Africans than others, and welcomed them as full members of their respective cultures and communities. Other Native Americans saw uses for slavery, and did not oppose it for others. Some Native Americans and people of African descent fought alongside one another in armed struggles of resistance against U.S. expansion into Native territories, as in the Seminole Wars in Florida.

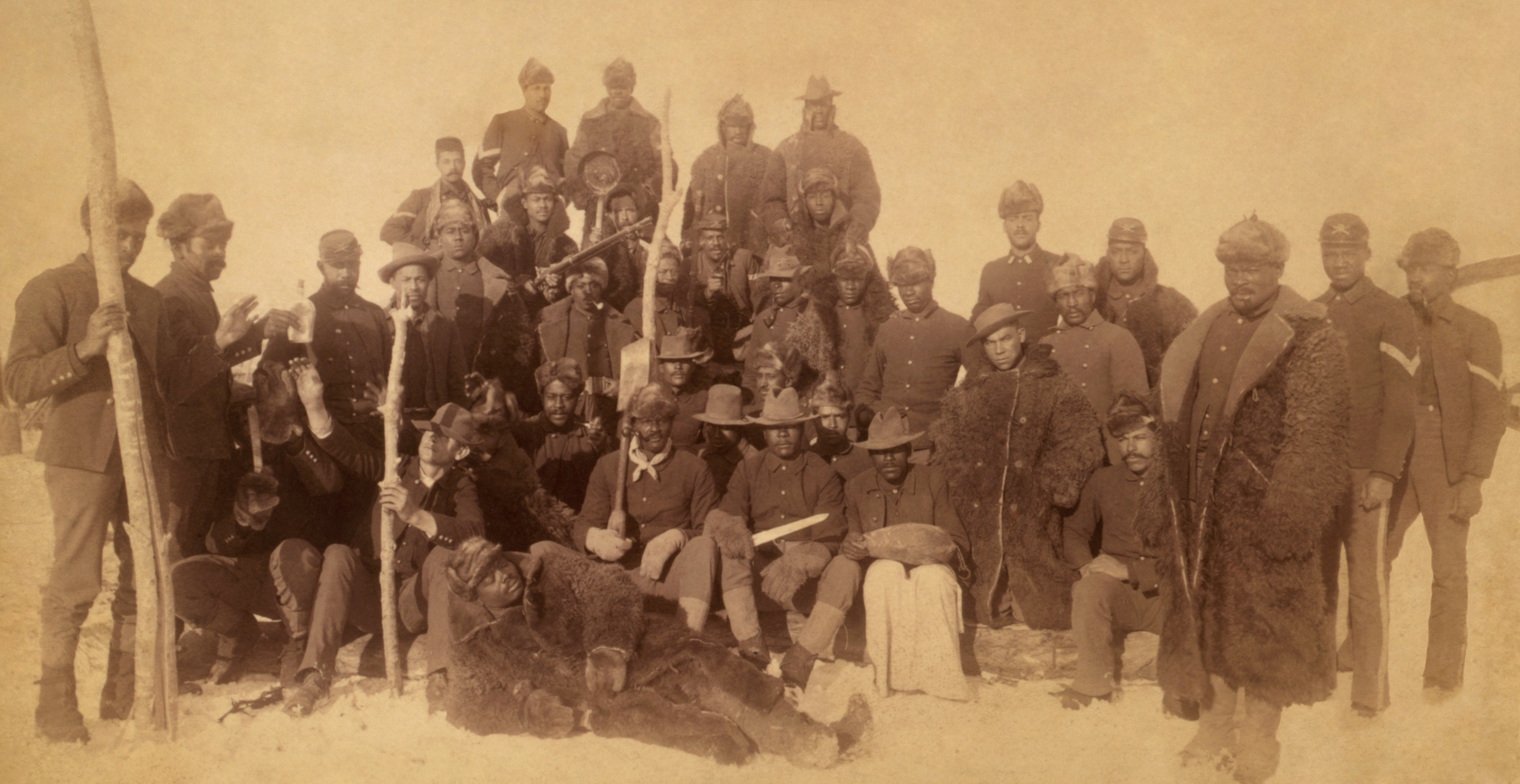
Buffalo Soldiers, 1890. The nickname was given to the "Black Cavalry" by the Native American tribes they fought.

After the American Civil War, some African Americans became (or continued as) members of the US Army. Many were assigned to fight against Native Americans in the wars in the Western frontier states. Their military units became known as the Buffalo Soldiers, a nickname given by Native Americans. Black Seminole men in particular were recruited from Indian Territory to work as Native American scouts for the Army.

In New England and the Northeastern United States, Black ancestry is common among some federally recognized tribes, including the Mashantucket Pequot Tribe, the Narragansett Indian Tribe, the Shinnecock Indian Nation, the Wampanoag Tribe of Gay Head, and the Mashpee Wampanoag Tribe.

Intermarriage between Black Americans and Native Americans was common in Massachusetts as early as the 17th century. A 1792 census of Wampanoag people at Gay Head showed that 28% of the tribe had African ancestry. While many Wampanoags with African ancestry tried to distinguish themselves from the Black population, this did not always succeed from the perspective of the white population. People of mixed Black and Wampanoag ancestry were generally accepted as Wampanoag by the tribe as long as they remained on Martha's Vinyard. Black Wampanoags who moved away from the community could have their Native identity questioned, including by Wampanoag people.

== History ==
=== European colonization of the Americas ===
Records of contacts between Africans and Native Americans date to April 1502, when the first enslaved African arrived in Hispaniola. Some Africans escaped inland from the colony of Santo Domingo; those who survived and joined with the Native tribes became the first group of Black Indians. These first groups of Black Indians established a number of Maroon settlements in the Caribbean. In the lands which later became part of the United States, the first recorded example of an enslaved African escaping from European colonists and being absorbed by Native Americans dates to 1526. In June of that year, Lucas Vázquez de Ayllón established a Spanish colony near the mouth of the Pee Dee River in present-day South Carolina. The Spanish settlement was named San Miguel de Guadalupe; its inhabitants included 100 enslaved Africans. In 1526 the first enslaved Africans fled the colony and took refuge in Shakori Indigenous communities.

In 1534 Pueblo peoples of the Southwest had contact with the Moroccan slave Esteban de Dorantes before any contact with the remainder of survivors of his Spanish expedition. As part of the Spanish Pánfilo de Narváez expedition, Esteban traveled from Florida in 1528 to what is now New Mexico in 1539, with a few other survivors. He is thought to have been killed by Zuni. More than a century later, when the Pueblos united to rid their homelands of the Spanish colonists during the 1690 Pueblo Revolt, one of the organizers of the revolt, Domingo Naranjo (c. 1644 – c. 1696) was a Santa Clara Pueblo man of African ancestry.

In 1622 Algonquian Native Americans attacked the colony of Jamestown in Virginia. They massacred all the Europeans but brought some of the few enslaved Africans as captives back to their own communities, gradually assimilating them. Interracial relationships continued to take place between Africans (and later African Americans) and members of Native American tribes in the coastal states. Although the colonists tried to enslave Native Americans in the early years, they abandoned the practise in the early 18th century. Several colonial advertisements for runaway slaves made direct reference to the connections which Africans had in Native American communities. "Reward notices in colonial newspapers now told of African slaves who 'ran off with his Indian wife' or 'had kin among the Indians' or is 'part-Indian and speaks their language good'."

Several of the Thirteen Colonies passed laws prohibiting the transportation of enslaved people into the frontier of the Cherokee Nation's territory to restrict interactions between the two groups. European colonists told the Cherokee that the smallpox epidemic of 1739 in the Southeast was due to disease brought by enslaved African. Some tribes encouraged intermarriage with Africans, with the idea that stronger children would result from the unions.

Colonists in South Carolina felt so concerned about the possible threat posed by the mixed African and Native American population that they passed a law in 1725 prohibiting taking enslaved people to the frontier regions, and imposing a fine of 200 pounds if violated. In 1751, South Carolina passed a law against holding Africans in proximity to Native Americans, as the planters considered that detrimental to the security of the colony. Under Governor James Glen (in office 1743–1756), South Carolina promoted an official policy that aimed to create in Native Americans an "aversion" to African Americans in an attempt to thwart possible alliances between them.

In 1753, during the chaos of Pontiac's War, a resident of Detroit observed that the Native tribes revolting were killing any whites they came across but were "saving and caressing all the Negroes they take." The resident expressed fear that this practice could eventually lead to a uprising amongst the enslaved people. Similarly, Iroquois chief Thayendanegea, more commonly known as Joseph Brant, similarly welcomed runaway slaves and encouraged them to intermarry in the tribe. Native American adoptions system did not discriminate on the basis of color, and Indian villages would eventually serve as stations on the Underground Railroad.

Historian Carter G. Woodson believed that relations with Native American tribes could have provided an escape hatch from slavery: Native American villages welcomed fugitive slaves and, in the antebellum years, some served as stations on the Underground Railroad.

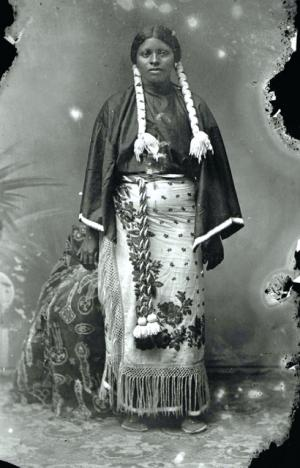
Diana Fletcher (b. 1838), a Black Seminole who was adopted into the Kiowa tribe

There were varieties of attitude: some Native Americans resented the presence of Africans. In one account, the "Catawaba tribe in 1752 showed great anger and bitter resentment when an African American came among them as a trader."

European and European-American colonists tried to divide Native Americans and African Americans against each other. Europeans considered both races inferior and tried to convince Native Americans that Africans worked against their best interests.

In the colonial period, Native Americans received rewards if they returned formerly enslaved people who had escaped. In the latter 19th century, African-American soldiers (buffalo soldiers) had assignments to fight with U.S. forces in Indian Wars in the West.

=== European enslavement ===
European colonists created a new demand market for captives of raids when they founded what would go on to become the Thirteen Colonies. Especially in the southern colonies, initially developed for resource exploitation rather than settlement, colonists purchased or captured Native Americans to be used as forced labor in cultivating tobacco, and, by the 18th century, rice and indigo.

To acquire trade goods, Native Americans began selling war captives to whites rather than integrating them into their own societies. Traded goods, such as axes, bronze kettles, Caribbean rum, European jewelry, needles, and scissors, varied among the tribes, but the most prized were rifles. The English copied the Spanish and Portuguese: they saw the enslavement of Africans and Native Americans as a moral, legal, and socially acceptable institution; a common rationale for enslavement was the taking of captives after a "just war" and using slavery as an alternative to a death sentence.

The escape of Native American slaves was frequent, because they had a better understanding of the land, which African slaves did not. Consequently, the Natives who were captured and sold into slavery were often sent to the West Indies, or far away from their traditional homeland.

The oldest known record of a permanent Native American slave was a native man from Massachusetts in 1636. By 1661 slavery had become legal in all of the thirteen colonies. Virginia would later declare "Indians, Mulattos, and Negros to be real estate", and in 1682 New York forbade African or Native American slaves from leaving their master's home or plantation without permission. European colonists also viewed the enslavement of Native Americans differently than the enslavement of Africans in some cases; a belief that Africans were "brutish people" was dominant. While both Native Americans and Africans were considered savages, Native Americans were romanticized as noble people that could be elevated into Christian civilization.

It is estimated that Carolina traders operating out of Charles Town exported an estimated 30,000 to 51,000 Native American captives between 1670 and 1715 in a profitable slave trade with the Caribbean, Spanish Hispaniola, and the Northern colonies. It was more profitable to have Native American slaves because African slaves had to be shipped and purchased, while native slaves could be captured and immediately taken to plantations; whites in the Northern colonies sometimes preferred Native American slaves, especially Native women and children, to Africans because Native American women were agriculturalist and children could be trained more easily.

However, Carolinians had more of a preference for African slaves but also capitalized on the Indian slave trade combining both. By the late 1700s records of slaves mixed with African and Native American heritage were recorded. In the eastern colonies it became common practice to enslave Native American women and African men with a parallel growth of enslavement for both Africans and Native Americans. This practice also lead to large number of unions between Africans and Native Americans. This practice of combining African slave men and Native American women was especially common in South Carolina.

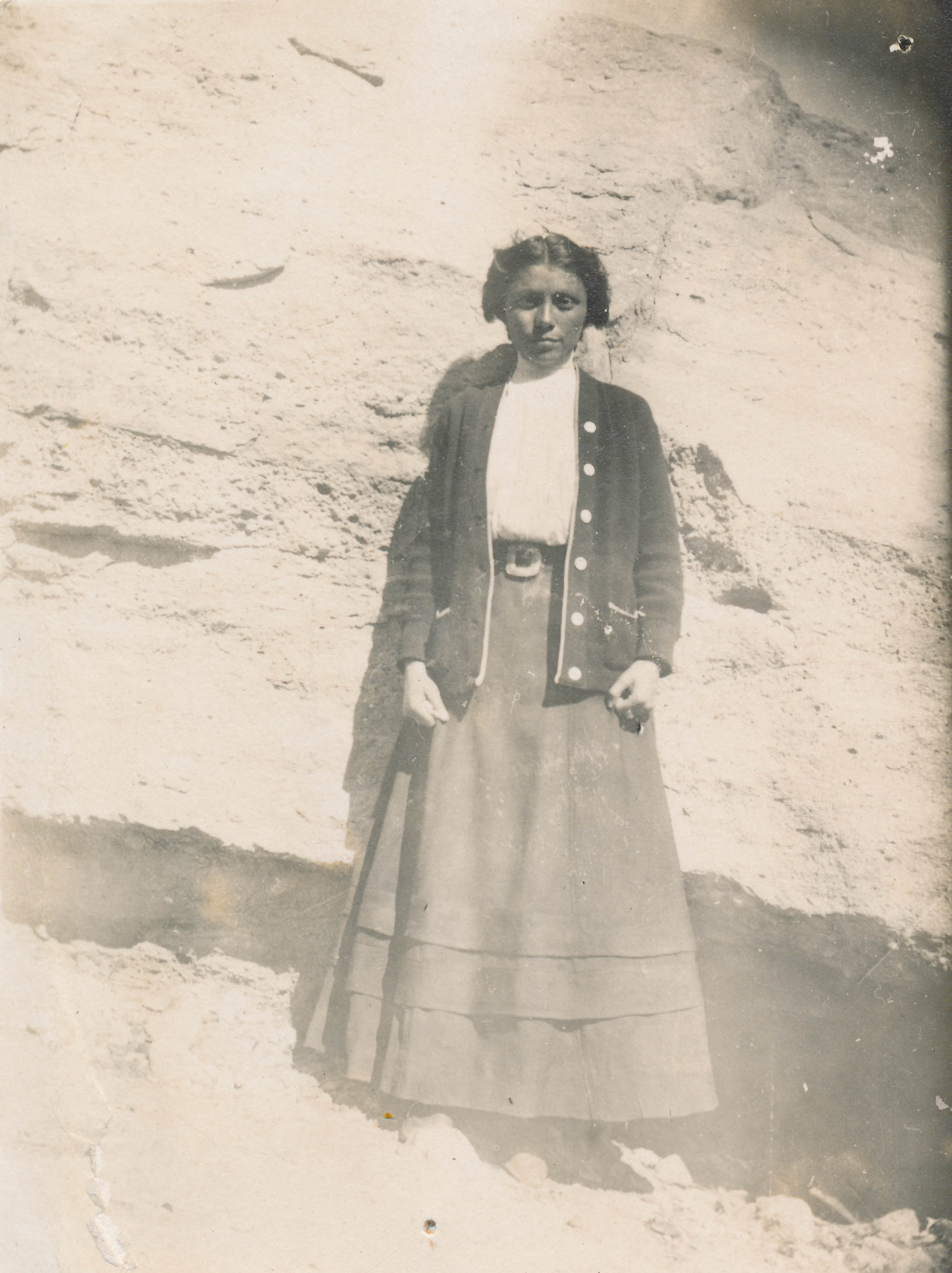
Portrait of a Navajo woman c. 19th century.

During this time records also show that many Native American women bought African men but, unknown to the European traders, the women freed and married the men into their tribe. The Indian wars of the early 18th century, combined with the growing availability of African slaves, essentially ended the Indian Slave trade by 1750. Numerous colonial slave traders had been killed in the fighting, and the remaining Native American groups banded together, more determined to face the Europeans from a position of strength rather than be enslaved.

A remarkable evidence of the European colonists' fear of possible resistance on the part of all enslaved individuals, as well as former slaves and their descendants, irrespective of ancestry, is found in the Census of slaves, conducted in the Province of New York in 1755. In the published record, a long list of enslaved individuals in Oyster Bay (a town on Long Island) is followed by an additional list of "free Negroes Melattoes [people of Afro-European ancestry] and Mustees [Mestizo] Resideing within ye Township of Oysterbay that may probably Be Likely In case of Insurrections To be as Mischevious as ye Slaves." (Free individuals were not supposed to be reported for the Census; a local militia captain supplied it on his own initiative, with the expectation "that ye Other Captains in Oysterbay will acquaint Your Honour [governor of New York] of those Resideing in ye Other parts of ye Township.")

Though the Indian Slave Trade ended the practice of enslaving Native Americans continued, records from June 28, 1771, show Native American children were kept as slaves in Long Island, New York. Native Americans had also married while enslaved creating families both native and some of partial African descent. Occasional mentioning of Native American slaves running away, being bought, or sold along with Africans in newspapers is found throughout the later colonial period. There are also many accounts of former slaves mentioning having a parent or grandparent who was Native American or of partial descent.

Advertisements asked for the return of both African American and Native American slaves. Records and slave narratives obtained by the WPA (Works Progress Administration) clearly indicate that the enslavement of Native Americans continued in the 1800s mostly through kidnappings. The abductions showed that even in the 1800s little distinction was still made between African Americans and Native Americans. Both Native American and African-American slaves were at risk of sexual abuse by slaveholders and other white men of power.

During the transitional period of Africans' becoming the primary race enslaved, Native Americans had been sometimes enslaved at the same time. Africans and Native Americans worked together, lived together in communal quarters, along with white indentured servants, produced collective recipes for food, and shared herbal remedies, myths and legends. Some intermarried and had mixed-race children. The exact number of Native Americans who were enslaved is unknown because vital statistics and census reports were at best infrequent. Andrés Reséndez estimates that between 147,000 and 340,000 Native Americans were enslaved in North America, excluding Mexico.

Among the Cherokee, interracial marriages or unions increased as the number of slaves held by the tribe increased. The Cherokee had a reputation for having slaves work side by side with their owners. The Cherokee resistance to the Euro-American system of chattel slavery created tensions between them and European Americans. The Cherokee tribe began to become divided; as intermarriage between white men and native women increased and there was increased adoption of European culture, so did racial discrimination against those of African-Cherokee blood and against African slaves. Cultural assimilation among the tribes, particularly the Cherokee, created pressure to be accepted by European Americans.

After Indian slavery was ended in the colonies, some African men chose Native American women as their partners because their children would be born free. Beginning from 1662 in Virginia, and soon followed by other colonies, they had established a law, known as partus sequitur ventrem, that said a child's status followed that of the mother. Separately, according to the matrilineal system among many Native American tribes, children were considered to be born to and to belong to the mother's people, so were raised as Native American. As European expansion increased in the Southeast, African and Native American marriages became more common.

=== 1800s through the Civil War ===
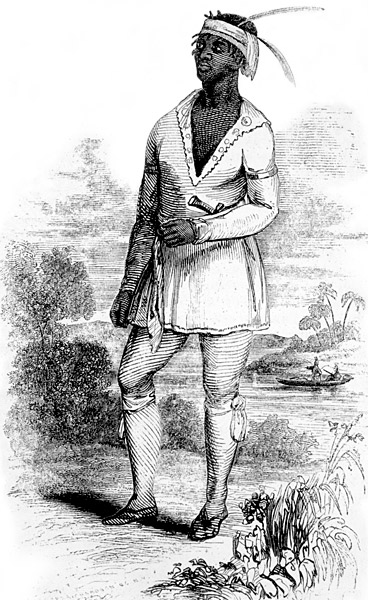
John Horse, a Black Seminole

In the early 19th century, the US government believed that some tribes had become extinct, especially on the East Coast, where there had been a longer period of European settlement, and where most Native Americans had lost their communal land. Few reservations had been established and they were considered landless. At that time, the government did not have a separate census designation for Native Americans. Those who remained among the European-American communities were frequently listed as mulatto, a term applied to Native American-white, Native American-African, and African-white mixed-race people, as well as tri-racial people.

The Seminole people of Florida formed in the 18th century, in what is called ethnogenesis, from Muscogee (Creek) and Florida tribes. They incorporated some Africans who had escaped from slavery. Other maroons formed separate communities near the Seminole, and were allied with them in military actions. Much intermarriage took place. African Americans living near the Seminole were called Black Seminole. Several hundred people of African descent traveled with the Seminole when they were removed to Indian Territory. Others stayed with the few hundred Seminole who remained in Florida, undefeated by the Americans.

By contrast, an 1835 census of the Cherokee showed that 10% were of African descent. In those years, censuses of the tribes classified people of mixed Native American and African descent as "Native American". But during the registration of tribal members for the Dawes Rolls, which preceded land allotment by individual heads of household of the tribes, generally Cherokee Freedmen were classified separately on a Freedmen roll. Registrars often worked quickly, judging by appearance, without asking if the Freedmen had Cherokee ancestry, which would have qualified them as "Cherokee by blood" and listing on those rolls.

This issue has caused problems for their descendants in the late 20th and 21st century. The nation passed legislation and a constitutional amendment to make membership more restrictive, open only to those with certificates of blood ancestry (CDIB), with proven descent from "Cherokee by blood" individuals on the Dawes Rolls. Western frontier artist George Catlin described "Negro and North American Indian, mixed, of equal blood" and stated they were "the finest built and most powerful men I have ever yet seen". By 1922 John Swanton's survey of the Five Civilized Tribes noted that half the Cherokee Nation consisted of Freedmen and their descendants.

Former slaves and Native Americans intermarried in northern states as well. Massachusetts Vital Records prior to 1850 included notes of "Marriages of 'negroes' to Indians". By 1860 in some areas of the South, where race was considered binary of black (mostly enslaved) or white, white legislators thought the Native Americans no longer qualified as "Native American", as many were mixed and part black. They did not recognize that many mixed-race Native Americans identified as Indian by culture and family. Legislators wanted to revoke the Native American tax exemptions.

Freed African Americans, Black Indians, and Native Americans fought in the American Civil War against the Confederate Army. During November 1861, the Muscogee Creek and Black Indians, led by Creek Chief Opothleyahola, fought three pitched battles against Confederate whites and allied Native Americans to reach Union lines in Kansas and offer their services. Some Black Indians served in colored regiments with other African-American soldiers.

Black Indians were documented in the following regiments: the 1st Kansas Colored Infantry, the Kansas Colored at Honey Springs, the 79th US Colored Infantry, and the 83rd US Colored Infantry, along with other colored regiments that included men listed as Negro. Some Civil War battles occurred in Indian Territory. The first battle in Indian Territory took place on July 1–2, 1863, and Union forces included the 1st Kansas Colored Infantry. The first battle against the Confederacy outside Indian Territory occurred at Horse Head Creek, Arkansas on February 17, 1864. The 79th US Colored Infantry participated.

Many Black Indians returned to Indian Territory after the Civil War had been won by the Union. When the Confederacy and its Native American allies were defeated, the US required new peace treaties with the Five Civilized Tribes, requiring them to emancipate slaves and make those who chose to stay with the tribes full citizens of their nations, with equal rights in annuities and land allotments. The former slaves were called "Freedmen", as in Cherokee Freedmen, Chickasaw Freedmen, Choctaw Freedmen, Creek Freedmen and Seminole Freedmen. The pro-Union branch of the Cherokee government had freed their slaves in 1863, before the end of the war, but the pro-Confederacy Cherokee held their slaves until forced to emancipate them.

=== Native American slave ownership ===
Slavery had existed among Native Americans, as a way to make use of war captives, before it was introduced by the Europeans. It was not the same as the European style of chattel slavery, in which slaves were counted as the personal property of a master. In Cherokee oral tradition, they enslaved war captives and it was a temporary status pending adoption into a family and clan, or release.

As the United States Constitution and the laws of several states permitted slavery after the American Revolution (while northern states prohibited it), Native Americans were legally allowed to own slaves, including those brought from Africa by Europeans. In the 1790s, Benjamin Hawkins was the federal agent assigned to the southeastern tribes. Promoting assimilation to European-American mores, he advised the tribes to take up slaveholding so that they could undertake farming and plantations as did other Americans. The Cherokee tribe had the most members who held black slaves, more than any other Native American nation.

Records from the slavery period show several cases of brutal Native American treatment of black slaves. However, most Native American masters rejected the worst features of Southern practices. Federal Agent Hawkins considered the form of slavery as practiced by the Southern tribes to be inefficient because the majority didn't practice chattel slavery. Travelers reported enslaved Africans "in as good circumstances as their masters". A white Indian Agent, Douglas Cooper, upset by the Native American failure to practice more severe rules, insisted that Native Americans invite white men to live in their villages and "control matters".

Though less than 3% of Native Americans owned slaves, the fact of a racial caste system and bondage, and pressure from European-American culture, created destructive cleavages in their villages. Some already had a class hierarchy based on "white blood", in part because Native Americans of mixed race sometimes had stronger networks with traders for goods they wanted. Among some bands, Native Americans of mixed white blood stood at the top, pure Native Americans next, and people of African descent were at the bottom. Some of the status of partial white descent may have been related to the economic and social capital passed on by white relations.

Members of Native groups held numerous African-American slaves through the Civil War. Some of these slaves later recounted their lives for a WPA oral history project during the Great Depression in the 1930s.

=== Native American Freedmen ===
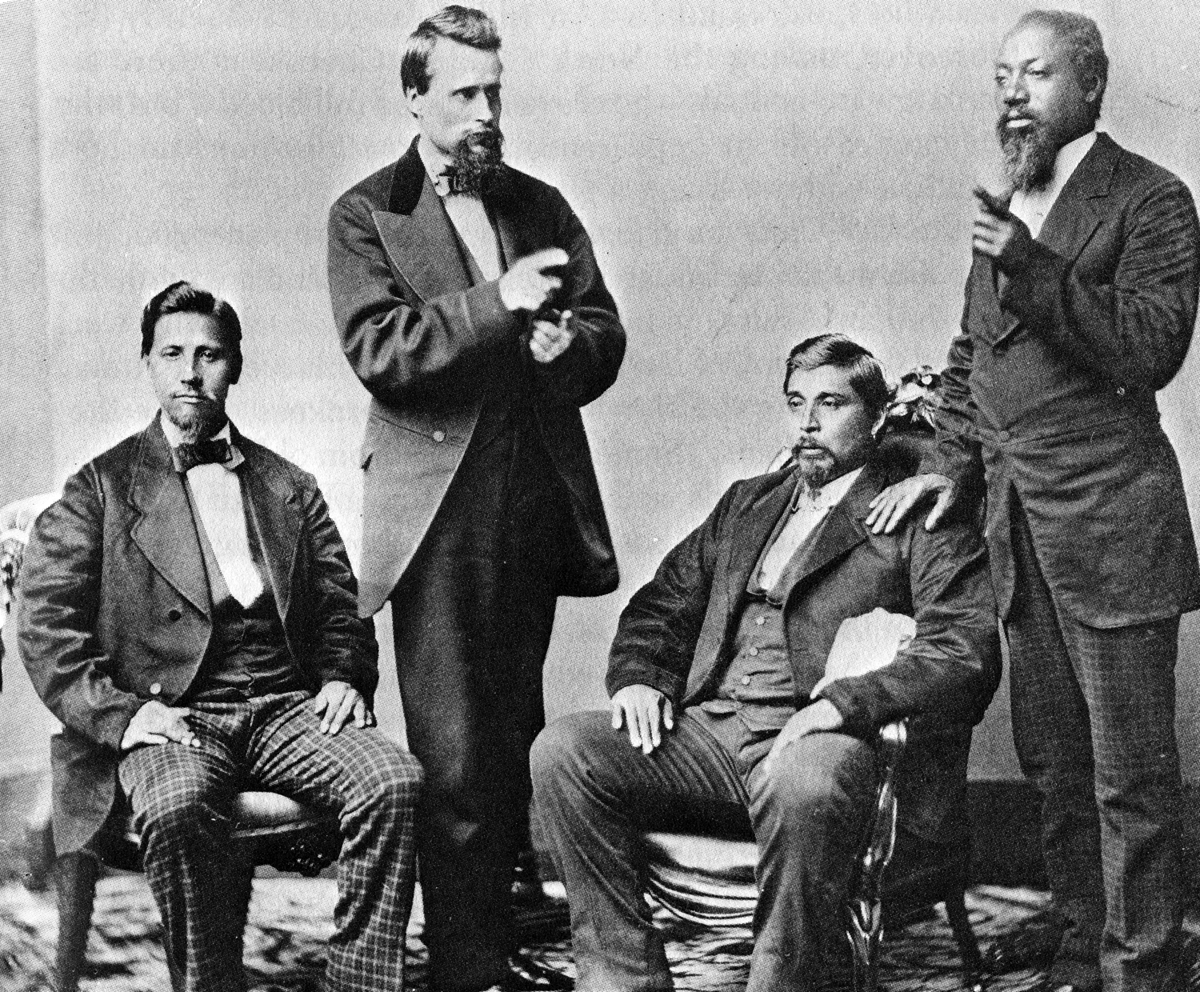
Members of the Creek (Muscogee) Nation in Oklahoma around 1877. Note mixed European, African and Native American ancestry. L to R, Lochar Harjo, principal chief; unidentified man, John McGilvry, and Silas Jefferson or Hotulko micco (Chief of the Whirlwind). The latter two were interpreters and negotiators.

After the Civil War, in 1866 the United States government required new treaties with the Five Civilized Tribes, who each had major factions allied with the Confederacy. They were required to emancipate their slaves and grant them citizenship and membership in the respective tribes, as the United States freed slaves and granted them citizenship by amendments to the US Constitution. These people were known as "Freedmen", for instance, Muscogee or Cherokee Freedmen.

Similarly, the Cherokee were required to reinstate membership for the Delaware, who had earlier been given land on their reservation, but fought for the Union during the war. Many of the Freedmen played active political roles in their tribal nations over the ensuing decades, including roles as interpreters and negotiators with the federal government. African Muscogee men, such as Harry Island and Silas Jefferson, helped secure land for their people when the government decided to make individual allotments to tribal members under the Dawes Act.

Some Maroon communities allied with the Seminole in Florida and intermarried. The Black Seminole included those with and without Native American ancestry.

When the Cherokee Nation drafted its constitution in 1975, enrollment was limited to descendants of people listed on the Dawes "Cherokee By Blood" rolls. On the Dawes Rolls, US government agents had classified people as Cherokee by blood, intermarried whites, and Cherokee Freedmen, regardless of whether the latter had Cherokee ancestry qualifying them as Cherokee by blood. The Shawnee and Delaware gained their own federal recognition as the Delaware Tribe of Indians and the Shawnee Tribe. A political struggle over this issue has ensued since the 1970s. Cherokee Freedmen have taken cases to the Cherokee Supreme Court. The Cherokee later reinstated the rights of Delaware to be considered members of the Cherokee, but opposed their bid for independent federal recognition.

The Cherokee Nation Supreme Court ruled in March 2006 that Cherokee Freedmen were eligible for tribal enrollment. In 2007, leaders of the Cherokee Nation held a special election to amend their constitution to restrict requirements for citizenship in the tribe. The referendum established direct Cherokee ancestry as a requirement. The measure passed in March 2007, thereby forcing out Cherokee Freedmen and their descendants unless they also had documented, direct "Cherokee by blood" ancestry. This has caused much controversy. The tribe has determined to limit membership only to those who can demonstrate Native American descent based on listing on the Dawes Rolls.

Similarly, the Seminole Nation of Oklahoma moved to exclude Seminole Freedmen from membership. In 1990 it received $56 million from the US government as reparations for lands taken in Florida. Because the judgment trust was based on tribal membership as of 1823, it excluded Seminole Freedmen, as well as Black Seminoles who held land next to Seminole communities. In 2000 the Seminole chief moved to formally exclude Black Seminoles unless they could prove descent from a Native American ancestor on the Dawes Rolls. 2,000 Black Seminoles were excluded from the nation. Descendants of Freedmen and Black Seminoles are working to secure equal citizenship and rights within tribes.

"There's never been any stigma about intermarriage", says Stu Phillips, editor of The Seminole Producer, a local newspaper in central Oklahoma. "You've got Indians marrying whites, Indians marrying blacks. It was never a problem until they got some money."

An advocacy group representing descendants of Freedmen of the Five Civilized Tribes claims that members are entitled to be citizens in both the Seminole and Cherokee nations, as many are indeed part Native American by blood, with records to prove it. Because of racial discrimination, their ancestors were classified and listed incorrectly, under only the category of Freedmen, at the time of the Dawes Rolls. In addition, the group notes that post-Civil War treaties of these tribes with the US government required they give African Americans full citizenship upon emancipation, regardless of blood quantum. In many cases, Native American descent has been difficult for people to trace from historical records. Over 25,000 Freedmen descendants of the Five Civilized Tribes may be affected by the legal controversies.

The Dawes Commission enrollment records, intended to establish rolls of tribal members for land allocation purposes, were done under rushed conditions by a variety of recorders. Many tended to exclude Freedmen from Cherokee rolls and enter them separately, even when they claimed Cherokee descent, had records of it, and had Cherokee physical features. Descendants of Freedmen see the tribe's contemporary reliance on the Dawes Rolls as a racially based way to exclude them from citizenship.

Before the Dawes Commission was established,

(t)he majority of the people with African blood living in the Cherokee nation prior to the Civil war lived there as slaves of Cherokee citizens or as free black non-citizens, usually the descendants of Cherokee men and women with African blood ... In 1863, the Cherokee government outlawed slavery through acts of the tribal council. In 1866, a treaty was signed with the US government in which the Cherokee government agreed to give citizenship to those people with African blood living in the Cherokee nations who were not already citizens. African Cherokee people participated as full citizens of that nation, holding office, voting, running businesses, etc.

After the Dawes Commission established tribal rolls, in some cases Freedmen of the Cherokee and the other Five Civilized Tribes were treated more harshly. Degrees of continued acceptance into tribal structures were low during the ensuing decades. Some tribes restricted membership to those with a documented Native ancestor on the Dawes Commission listings, and many restricted officeholders to those of direct Native American ancestry. In the later 20th century, it was difficult for Black Native Americans to establish official ties with Native groups to which they genetically belonged. Many Freedmen descendants believe that their exclusion from tribal membership, and the resistance to their efforts to gain recognition, are racially motivated and based on the tribe's wanting to preserve the new gambling revenues for fewer people.

== Genealogy and genetics ==
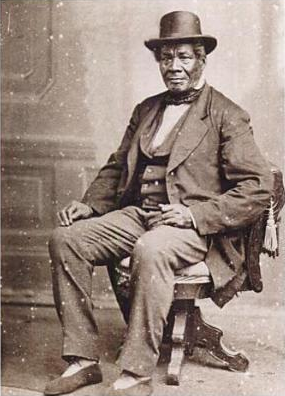
George Bonga (1802–1880), African American and Ojibwe fur trader

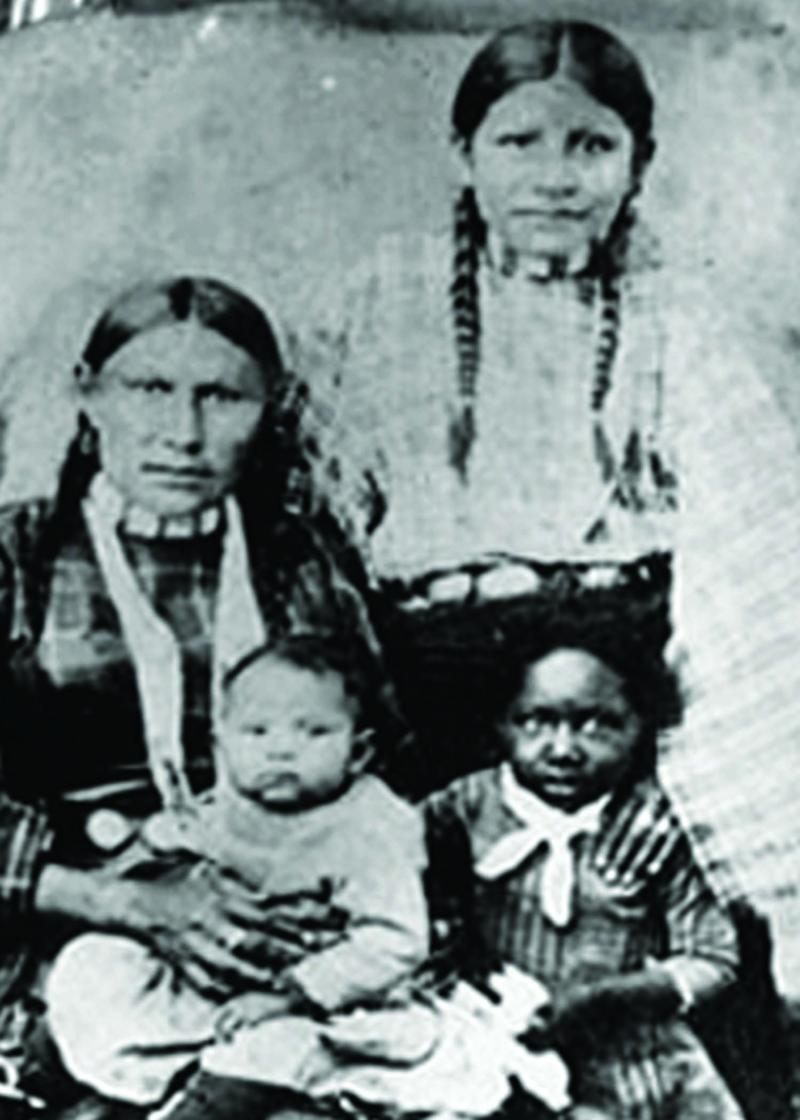
Left to right: Mrs. Amos Chapman, her daughter, sister (all Southern Cheyenne), and an unidentified girl of African American descent. 1886

African Americans looking to trace their genealogy can face many difficulties. While a number of the Native American nations are better-documented than the white communities of the era, the destruction of family ties and family records during the human trafficking of the Atlantic slave trade has made tracking African American family lines much more difficult. In Black Indians: A Hidden Heritage, William Katz writes that the number of Black Indians among the Native American nations were "understated by hundreds of thousands", and that by comparing pictorial documentation to verbal and written accounts, it is clear that Black Indians existed in these settings, but were often simply not remarked upon or recorded by white chroniclers of the era.

Enslaved Africans were renamed by those who enslaved them, and until after the American Civil War they were usually not even provided with surnames. Similarly, historical records which genealogists usually rely upon (such as censuses) did not record the names of enslaved African Americans before the Civil War. While some major slavers kept extensive records which historians and genealogists have used to create family trees, researchers generally find it difficult to trace the history of African American families before the Civil War. Enslaved people were also forbidden to learn to read and write, and harshly punished or even killed if they defied this ban, making records kept by families themselves extremely rare.

Elder family members may have tried to keep an oral history of the family, but due to the many challenges listed above, these accounts have not always been reliable. Knowing the family's geographic origins may help individuals know where to start in piecing together their genealogy. Working from oral history and existing records, descendants can try to confirm stories of more precise African origins, as well as those of any possible Native ancestry through genealogical research and even DNA testing. However, DNA cannot reliably indicate Native American ancestry, and no DNA test can indicate tribal origin.

DNA testing and research has provided some data about the extent of Native American ancestry among African Americans, which varies in the general population. Based on the work of geneticists, Harvard University historian Henry Louis Gates Jr. hosted a popular, and at times controversial, PBS series, African American Lives, in which geneticists said DNA evidence shows that Native American ancestry is far less common among African Americans than previously believed.

Their conclusions suggested that while almost all African Americans are racially mixed, and many have family stories of Native heritage, usually these stories turn out to be inaccurate, with only five percent of African American people showing more than two percent Native American ancestry. Gates summarized these statistics as follows: "If you have two percent Native American ancestry, you had one such ancestor on your family tree five to nine generations back (150 to 270 years ago)." Their findings also concluded that the most common "non-Black" mix among African Americans is English and Scots-Irish. Some critics thought the PBS series did not sufficiently explain the limitations of DNA testing for assessment of heritage.

Another study, published in the American Journal of Human Genetics, also indicated that, despite how common stories of Native American ancestry are within African-American families, relatively few who were tested actually turned out to have detectable Native American ancestry. A study reported in the American Journal of Human Genetics stated, "We analyzed the European genetic contribution to 10 populations of African descent in the United States (Maywood, Illinois; Detroit; New York; Philadelphia; Pittsburgh; Baltimore; Charleston, South Carolina; New Orleans; and Houston) ... mtDNA haplogroups analysis shows no evidence of a significant maternal Amerindian contribution to any of the 10 populations." Henry Louis Gates Jr. wrote in 2009,

Here are the facts: Only 5 percent of all black Americans have at least 12.5 percent Native American ancestry, the equivalent of at least one great-grandparent. Those 'high cheek bones' and 'straight black hair' your relatives brag about at every family reunion and holiday meal since you were 2 years old? Where did they come from? To paraphrase a well-known French saying, 'Seek the white man.' African Americans, just like our first lady, are a racially mixed or mulatto people—deeply and overwhelmingly so. Fact: Fully 58 percent of African American people, according to geneticist Mark Shriver at Morehouse College, possess at least 12.5 percent European ancestry (again, the equivalent of that one great-grandparent).

Geneticists from Kim TallBear (Dakota) to the Indigenous Peoples Council on Biocolonialism (IPCB) agree that DNA testing is not how tribal identity is determined, with TallBear stressing that

People think there is a DNA test to prove you are Native American. There isn't.

and the IPCB noting that

"Native American markers" are not found solely among Native Americans. While they occur more frequently among Native Americans they are also found in people in other parts of the world.

TallBear also stresses that tribal identity is based in political citizenship, culture, lineage and family ties, not "blood", "race", or genetics.

Writing for ScienceDaily, Troy Duster wrote that the two common types of tests used are Y-chromosome and mtDNA (mitochondrial DNA) testing. The tests processes for direct-line male and female ancestors. Each follows only one line among many ancestors and thus can fail to identify others. Though DNA testing for ancestry is limited, a paper in 2015 posited that ancestries can show different percentages based on the region and sex of one's ancestors. These studies found that on average, people who identified as African American in their sample group had 73.2–82.1% West African, 16.7%-29% European, and 0.8–2% Native American genetic ancestry, with large variation between individuals.

Autosomal DNA testing surveys DNA that has been inherited from parents of an individual. Autosomal tests focus on genetic markers which might be found in Africans, Asians, and people from every other part of the world. DNA testing still cannot determine an individual's full ancestry with absolute certitude.

Claims of African American and Native American identity are often disputed. As Sharon P. Holland and Tiya Miles note, "Pernicious cultural definitions of race ... structure this divide, as blackness has been capaciously defined by various state laws according to the legendary one-drop rule, while Indianness has been defined by the US government according to the many buckets rule."

While many US states historically categorized a person as Black if they had even one Black ancestor (the "one drop rule"), Native Americans have been required to meet high blood quantum requirements. For example, the Indian Reorganization Act of 1934 only recognized Native people with "one half or more Indian blood". It can sometimes be difficult for Native people to provide paper evidence of their ancestry, especially for Black Native Americans as their mixed race ancestors may have been recorded only as Black. Many tribes today still have blood quantum requirements as part of their criteria for tribal membership.

== Notable Black Native Americans ==
The list below contains notable individuals with African American ancestry who are tribal citizens or who have been recognized by their communities.

=== Historic ===
- William Apess (African-Pequot, 1798–1839), Methodist minister and author
- Crispus Attucks (African-Wampanoag, 1723–1770) dockworker, merchant seaman, an icon in the anti-slavery movement, the first casualty of the Boston Massacre and the American Revolutionary War
- George Bonga (African-Ojibwe, 1802–1880), fur trader and interpreter in what is now Minnesota, son of trader and interpreter Pierre Bonga
- Billy Bowlegs III (Seminole Freedman, 1862–1965)
- Ellison Brown (Narragansett, 1913–1975), Olympian marathon runner
- Olivia Ward Bush, (Montauk, 1869–1944), author, poet, journalist and tribal historian
- Joseph Louis Cook (Mohawk tribal member of African-Abenaki descent, d. 1814), colonel in the Continental Army during the American Revolutionary War
- Paul Cuffee (Ashanti/Wampanoag, 1759–1817)
- Pompey Factor (African-Seminole, 1849–1928), Black Seminole Scout, Medal of Honor recipient
- John Horse, Juan Caballo (Black Seminole, 1812–1882), war chief in Florida, also the leader of African-Seminole in Mexico
- Edmonia Lewis (African–Haitian–Mississauga, c. 1845–1911), sculptor
- Zerviah Gould Mitchell (African-Wampanoag, 1807–1898), educator and direct descent of the sachem Massasoit
- Adam Paine (African-Seminole, 1843–1877), Black Seminole Scout, Medal of Honor recipient
- Isaac Payne (African-Seminole, 1854–1904), Black Seminole Scout, Medal of Honor recipient
- Marguerite Scypion (African-Natchez, c. 1770s – after 1836), freedwoman who won her freedom from slavery in court
- John Ward (African-Seminole, 1847 or 1848–1911), Black Seminole Scout, Medal of Honor recipient

=== Contemporary ===
- Natalie Ball (Klamath/Modoc), born 1980, interdisciplinary artist
- Joe Burton (Soboba Band of Luiseño Indians), professional basketball player; the first Native American man to earn a basketball scholarship at a Pac-12 Conference school
- Radmilla Cody (Diné), 46th Miss Navajo Nation (1998), traditional singer, enrolled member of the Navajo Nation with African-American ancestry, first bi-racial Miss Navajo, and advocate against domestic violence in both the Navajo Nation and the state of Arizona
- Angel Goodrich (Cherokee Nation), WNBA basketball player for the Tulsa Shock and the Seattle Storm
- Mary Ann Green (Augustine Cahuilla, 1964–2017), chairperson who reestablished the Augustine Cahuilla reservation and tribal government
- Richie Havens (Piegan Blackfeet, 1941–2013), musician and singer-songwriter
- Lisa Holt (Cochiti Pueblo), ceramic artist
- Mwalim (Mashpee Wampanoag), musician, writer, and educator
- Harlan Reano (Kewa Pueblo), ceramic artist
- Kyrie Irving (Lakota), born 1992, NBA basketball player
- France Winddance Twine (Muscogee (Creek) Nation, born 1960), sociologist
- William S. Yellow Robe Jr. (Assiniboine), playwright and educator
- Nyla Rose (Oneida descent), professional wrestler, martial artist, and actress
- Kelvin Sampson (Lumbee), college basketball coach
- Santiago X, Louisiana Coushatta multidisciplinary artist and architect
- Powtawche Valerino (Mississippi Choctaw), NASA engineer
- Marilyn Vann (Cherokee Nation), engineer and activist
- Delonte West (Piscataway), retired NBA basketball player

== See also ==
- Afro-Indigenous peoples
- Afro-Indigenous people in Canada
- Black Seminoles
- Creek Freedmen
- Maroons
- Zambo
- Cherokee Freedmen
- Dawes Rolls
- Mardi Gras Indians
- One-drop rule
- Racial isolates in the United States
- Runaway slaves in Spanish Florida
- Slavery in the colonial history of the United States
