= Ian Hancock =

Romani linguist (born 1942)

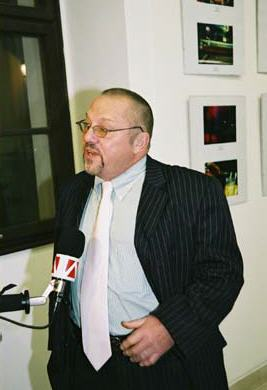
Hancock during a sponsored visit to the US Embassy in Bratislava, Slovakia, 10–14 January 2005.

Ian Francis Hancock OBE (Romani: Yanko le Redžosko; born 29 August 1942) is a linguist, Romani scholar and political advocate. He was born and raised in England and is one of the main contributors in the field of Romani studies.

He is director of the Program of Romani Studies and the Romani Archives and Documentation Center at The University of Texas at Austin, where he has been a professor of English, linguistics and Asian studies since 1972. He has represented the Romani people at the United Nations and served as a member of the US Holocaust Memorial Council under President Bill Clinton, who, Hancock claims, has Romani ancestry. He also represented the Romani people at the 1997 Rafto Prize award.

== Early life ==
Hancock was born in London in 1942. His mother, Kitty, is Romanichal; his father, Reginald (Redžo), was part Romungro, the descendant of a Hungarian speaker of North Central Romani named Imre Benczi. He acquired the surname Hancock by Imre's daughter, Maria, who married a member of an English West Country showman family of that name.

In the late 1960s, he became a Romani rights activist after reading reports about anti-Romani discrimination in Britain. In particular, he took up the cause of Romani rights after reading about an incident in which three Romani children were killed in a fire caused by a lamp after police officers, who had arrested their parents, attempted to use a bulldozer to forcibly remove their caravan while they were still inside. In 1971, he graduated with a Ph.D. in linguistics from the University of London.

== Romani studies ==
Hancock has published more than 300 books and articles on the Romani people and language (particularly the Vlax dialect). These works analyse the Romani people through not only Romani linguistics but also history, anthropology, and genetics. He has also appeared in the documentary American Gypsy. He is currently writing a book called On Romani Origins and Identity.

Hancock supports some of Ralph Lilley Turner's views on Romani history based on the Romani language. In particular, Hancock agrees that the Dom left India much earlier than the Romani people i.e. before 1000 AD. In fact, he claims that the Indian musicians mentioned in the Shah-Nameh and the atsingani mentioned in The Life of St. George the Anchorite, both of which were previously believed to be ancestors of the Romani people, may have been the ancestors of the Domari people but not of the Romani people. He considers it possible that the Lom split off from the Romani people on reaching Armenia.

Contrary to the popular view that the Romani people are descended from low-caste Indians who brought their occupations to Europe, he argues that the Romani people are descended from Indian prisoners of war of Mahmud of Ghazni. As evidence, he points to the presence of Indic words specifically of military origin and to a Banjara oral legend telling of Rajputs who left India through the Himalayas during the Ghaznavid invasions and never returned.

He also believes that the Romani language originates in a koine language, which he calls "Rajputic," between the many Indian languages spoken by the prisoners of war. He finds it thus similar to several other Indian languages, especially Hindustani.

As for Romani history, he points out a "Pariah syndrome" throughout time and space, culminating in the attempted genocide at the hands of Nazi authorities that was simultaneous to that of the Jews and part of the same "Final Solution of the Jewish and Gypsy Problem" project.

One of Hancock's papers was cited by the Supreme Court of Canada in R v Krymowski, a case interpreting Canada's hate speech laws. The Court concluded that references to "gypsies" can be taken to mean a reference to the Romani people, bringing them within the protection of the Criminal Code provision.

== Creole language studies ==
Hancock is as well known in the field of linguistics, particularly in the area of pidgin and creole languages, as he is in the world of Romani studies and Romani social activism. In addition to his research on the Krio language of Sierra Leone, he has studied the Gullah language, of coastal South Carolina and Georgia in the US, and the Afro-Seminole Creole language, spoken by a community of Black Seminole descendants in Brackettville, Texas, US. Hancock was the first scholar to report Afro-Seminole Creole. He later identified another variety of that language spoken among Black Seminole descendants in the village of El Nacimiento in the Mexican state of Coahuila, where their ancestors had settled in 1850. He maintains that Afro-Seminole Creole and Gullah are closely related languages, as Black Seminoles were descended primarily from Gullah people of the Low Country of South Carolina and Georgia in the US.

Hancock is recognised as one of the founders of the field of pidgin and creole linguistics. He has also done extensive research on the English-based creole languages spoken in West Africa and the West Indies. He is known especially for his views on the historical development of these languages. He maintains that all the English-based pidgins and creoles spoken in the Atlantic basin region, both in West Africa and in the Caribbean, belong to a single language family, which he calls the "English-based Atlantic Creoles." He argues that all of them can be traced back to what he calls Guinea Coast Creole English, which arose along the West African Coast in the 17th and 18th centuries, as a language of commerce in the Atlantic slave trade. He says that Guinea Coast Creole English was spoken in coastal slave trading bases such as James Island, Bunce Island, and Elmina Castle, where the offspring of British slave traders and their African wives used it as their native language.

Hancock says that Guinea Coast Creole English ultimately gave rise to the pidgin and creole languages spoken in West Africa today, such as the Aku language in the Gambia, Sierra Leone Krio, Nigerian Pidgin English and Cameroonian Pidgin English. He also maintains that some of the Africans taken as slaves to the New World already spoke Guinea Coast Creole English in Africa. Their creole speech influenced the development of creole languages spoken today on the American side of the Atlantic, such as Gullah, Afro-Seminole Creole, Bahamian Dialect, Jamaican Creole, Belizean Kriol, Guyanese Creole, and Sranan Tongo in Suriname.

Hancock's views on the connections among the Atlantic creole languages are controversial. The strong similarities among these languages are undeniable, but many linguists prefer to explain the similarities by convergence rather than historical relationships. Other scholars argue that both factors played a role in the formation of the languages. Derek Bickerton and some other linguists subscribe to a theory that attributes creole similarities (which extend to Indian Ocean creoles and Hawaiian Creole) to an innate "bioprogram" for language that emerges under the conditions common to most creole communities.
