= Gullah language =

Creole language of southern US

Gullah
- Gullah-English, Sea Island Creole English
- Native to: United States
- Region: South Carolina Lowcountry; coastal Georgia, including the Sea Islands
- Ethnicity: Gullahs
- Native speakers: 300 fluent (2021); 5,000 semi-fluent
- Language family: English-African Creole: Guinea Coast Creole English; Caribbean English Creole; Eastern Caribbean; Gullah–Nevis–Antigua; Bahamian–Gullah; Gullah
- Dialects: Afro-Seminole Creole
- Writing system: Latin

Language codes
- ISO 639-3: gul – inclusive code Sea Island Creole English; Individual code: afs – Afro-Seminole Creole
- Glottolog: gull1241 Sea Island Creole English
- ELP: Geechee-Gullah
- Linguasphere: 52-ABB-aa

A woman speaking Gullah and English

Gullah (also called Gullah-English, Sea Island Creole English, and Geechee) is a creole language historically spoken by the Gullah people (also called "Geechees" within the community), an African-American population living in the coastal areas of the U.S. states of North Carolina, South Carolina, Georgia and Florida from approximately Pender County, North Carolina to St. Augustine, Florida. Today, the language is spoken by around 5,000 Gullahs mostly in parts of South Carolina and Georgia.

== Origins ==
Gullah is based on different varieties of English and languages of Central Africa and West Africa. Scholars have proposed a number of theories about the origins of Gullah and its development:

1. Gullah developed independently on the Sea Islands off the coast of the Carolinas, Georgia, and Florida throughout the 18th and 19th centuries among enslaved Africans. They developed a language that combined grammatical, phonological, and lexical features of the nonstandard English varieties spoken by that region's white slaveholders and farmers, along with those from numerous Western and Central African languages. According to this view, Gullah developed separately or distinctly from African American Vernacular English and varieties of English spoken in the South.
2. Some enslaved Africans spoke a Guinea Coast Creole English, also called West African Pidgin English, before they were forcibly relocated to the Americas. Guinea Coast Creole English was one of many languages spoken along the West African coast in the 17th, 18th, and 19th centuries as a language of trade between Europeans and Africans and among multilingual Africans. It seems to have been prevalent in British coastal slave trading centers such as James Island, Bunce Island, Elmina Castle, Cape Coast Castle and Anomabu. This theory of Gullah's origins and development follows the monogenetic theory of creole development and the domestic origin hypothesis of English-based creoles.

== Related languages ==
Gullah resembles other English-based creole languages spoken in West Africa and the Caribbean Basin, including Krio of Sierra Leone, Bahamian Creole, Jamaican Patois, Bajan Creole, Trinidadian Creole, Tobagonian Creole, Sranan Tongo, Guyanese Creole, and Belizean Creole. Those languages are speculated to use English as a lexifier (most of their vocabularies are derived from English) and that their syntax (sentence structure) is strongly influenced by African languages, but research by Salikoko Mufwene and others suggests that nonstandard Englishes may have also influenced the syntactical features of Gullah (and other creoles).

Gullah is most closely related to Afro-Seminole Creole, which is spoken in scattered Black Seminole communities in Oklahoma, Texas, and Northern Mexico. The Black Seminoles' ancestors were Gullahs who escaped from slavery in coastal South Carolina and Georgia in the 18th and 19th centuries and fled into the Florida wilderness. They emigrated from Florida after the Second Seminole War (1835–1842). Their modern descendants in the West speak a conservative form of Gullah that resembles the language of 19th-century plantation slaves.

There is debate among linguists on the relationship between Gullah and African-American Vernacular English (AAVE). There are some that postulate a Gullah-like "plantation creole" that was the origin of AAVE. Others cite different British dialects of English as having had more influence on the structure of AAVE.

== Turner's research ==
In the 1930s and 1940s, the linguist Lorenzo Dow Turner did a seminal study of the language based on field research in rural communities in coastal South Carolina and Georgia. Turner found that Gullah is strongly influenced by African languages in its phonology, vocabulary, grammar, sentence structure, and semantics. Turner identified over 300 loanwords from various languages of Africa in Gullah and almost 4,000 African personal names used by Gullah people. He also found Gullahs living in remote seaside settlements who could recite songs and story fragments and do simple counting in the Mende, Vai, and Fulani languages of West Africa.

In 1949, Turner published his findings in a classic work called Africanisms in the Gullah Dialect (ISBN 9781570034527). The fourth edition of the book was reprinted with a new introduction in 2002.

Before Turner's work, mainstream scholars viewed Gullah speech as substandard English, a hodgepodge of mispronounced words and corrupted grammar, which uneducated black people developed in their efforts to copy the speech of their English, Irish, Scottish and French Huguenot slave owners.

Turner's study was so well researched and detailed in its evidence of African influences in Gullah that some academics soon changed their minds. But his book primarily "elicited praise but not emulation." Over time, other scholars began to take interest in the language and culture and start developing further research on Gullah language and culture.

== Today ==
Gullah is spoken by about 5,000 people in coastal South Carolina and Georgia. As of 2021, an estimated 300 people are native speakers. Although some scholars argue that Gullah has changed little since the 19th century and that most speakers have always been bilingual, it is likely that at least some decreolization has taken place. In other words, some African-influenced grammatical structures in Gullah a century ago are less common in the language today. Nonetheless, Gullah is still understood as a creole language and is certainly distinct from Standard American English.

For generations, outsiders stigmatized Gullah-speakers by regarding their language as a mark of ignorance and low social status. As a result, Gullah people developed the habit of speaking their language only within the confines of their own homes and local communities. That causes difficulty in enumerating speakers and assessing decreolization. It was not used in public situations outside the safety of their home areas, and many speakers experienced discrimination even within the Gullah community. Some speculate that the prejudice of outsiders may have helped to maintain the language. Others suggest that a kind of valorization or "covert prestige" remained for many community members and that the complex pride has insulated the language from obliteration.

US Supreme Court Justice Clarence Thomas was raised as a Gullah-speaker in coastal Pin Point, Georgia. When asked why he has little to say during hearings of the court, he told a high school student that the ridicule he received for his Gullah speech, as a young man, caused him to develop the habit of listening, rather than speaking, in public. Thomas's English-speaking grandfather raised him after the age of six in Savannah.

In recent years educated Gullah people have begun promoting use of Gullah openly as a symbol of cultural pride. In 2005, Gullah community leaders announced the completion of a translation of the New Testament into modern Gullah, a project that took more than 20 years to complete.

In 2017, Harvard University began offering Gullah/Geechee as a language class in its African Language Program. It is taught by Sunn m'Cheaux, a native speaker from South Carolina.

== Influence on English ==
The phrase Kumbaya ("Come by Here"), taken from the song of the same name, is likely of Gullah origin.

== Phonology ==
Consonants
		Bilabial	Labiodental	Dental	Alveolar	Post-alveolar	Palatal	Velar	Labial-velar	Glottal
Nasal		m			n		ɲ	ŋ		
Stop/Affricate	voiceless	p			t	tʃ	c	k	kp	ʔ
Stop/Affricate	voiced	b			d	dʒ	ɟ	ɡ	ɡb	
Stop/Affricate	ejective	p’			t’			k’		
Stop/Affricate	prenasalized	ᵐp ᵐb			ⁿt ⁿd ᵑd			ᵑk ᵑɡ		
Fricative	voiceless	ɸ	f	θ	s	ʃ	ɕ			h
Fricative	voiced	β	v	ð	z	ʒ	ʑ			
Fricative	ejective					ʃ’				
Fricative	prenasalized				ⁿs					
Trill					r					
Approximant	central				ɹ		j		w	
Approximant	lateral				l					
Approximant	prenasalized								ᵐw	

Vowels
	Front		Central	Back	
	lax	tense	Central	lax	tense
High	ɪ	i	ɚ	ʊ	u
High-mid		e	ə		o
Low-mid	ɛ		ʌ		ɔ
Low	æ a ã			ɒ	ɑ

== Grammar ==
=== Morphology ===
The following sentences illustrate the basic verb tense and aspect system in Gullah:

Uh he'p dem — "I help them/I helped them" (present/past tense)
Uh bin he'p dem — "I helped them" (past tense) [I've been helping them]
Uh gwine he'p dem — "I will help them" (future tense) [I'm going to help them]
Uh done he'p dem — "I have helped them" (perfect aspect) [I've done helped them]
Uh duh he'p dem — "I am helping them" (present continuous) [I do help them]
Uh binnuh he'p dem — "I was helping them" (past continuous) [I've been helping them]

=== Syntax ===
These sentences illustrate 19th-century Gullah speech:

Da' big dog, 'e bite'um — "That big dog, it bit him" (topicalization)
Duh him da' cry out so — "It is he (who) cried out that way" (fronting)
Uh tell'um say da' dog fuh bite'um — "I told him, said that dog would bite him" (dependent clauses with "say")
De dog run, gone, bite'um — "The dog ran, went, bit him" (serial verb construction)
Da' duh big big dog — "That is a big, big dog" (reduplication)

== Storytelling ==
The Gullah people have a rich storytelling tradition that is strongly influenced by African oral traditions but also by their historical experience in America. Their stories include animal trickster tales about the antics of "Br'er Rabbit", "Br'er Fox" and "Br'er Bear", "Br'er Wolf", etc.; human trickster tales about clever and self-assertive slaves; and morality tales designed to impart moral teaching to children.

Several white American writers collected Gullah stories in the late 19th and the early 20th centuries. The best collections were made by Charles Colcock Jones Jr. from Georgia and Albert Henry Stoddard from South Carolina. Jones, a Confederate officer during the Civil War, and Stoddard were both whites of the planter class who grew up speaking Gullah with the slaves (and later freedmen) on their families' plantations. Another collection was made by Abigail Christensen, a Northern woman whose parents came to the Low Country after the Civil War to assist the newly-freed slaves. Ambrose E. Gonzales, another writer of South Carolina planter-class background, also wrote original stories in 19th-century Gullah, based on Gullah literary forms; his works are well remembered in South Carolina today.

The linguistic accuracy of those writings has been questioned because of the authors' social backgrounds. Nonetheless, those works provide the best available information on Gullah, as it was spoken in its more conservative form in the 19th century.

== Vocabulary ==
The Gullah people have several words of Niger-Congo and Bantu origin in their language that have survived to the present day, despite over four hundred years of slavery when African Americans were forced to speak English.

The vocabulary of Gullah comes primarily from English, but there are numerous Africanisms that exist in their language for which scholars have yet to produce detailed etymologies. Some of the African loanwords include: cootuh 'turtle', oonuh 'you' (plural), nyam 'eat', buckruh 'white man', pojo 'heron', swonguh 'proud', and benne 'sesame'.

The Gullahs' English-based creole language is strikingly similar to Sierra Leone Krio of West Africa and contains such identical expressions as bigyai 'greedy', pantap 'on top of', ohltu 'both', tif 'steal', yeys 'ear', and swit 'delicious'. Linguists observe that 25% of the Gullah language's vocabulary originated from Sierra Leone. Songs and fragments of stories were traced to the Mende and Vai people, and simple counting in the Guinea/Sierra Leone dialect of the Fula people was also observed.

== Samples ==
These sentences are examples of how Gullah was spoken in the 19th century:

Uh gwine gone dey tomorruh.	"I will go there tomorrow."
We blan ketch 'nuf cootuh dey.	"We always catch a lot of turtles there."
Dem yent yeddy wuh oonuh say.	"They did not hear what you said."
Dem chillun binnuh nyam all we rice.	"Those children were eating all our rice."
'E tell'um say 'e haffuh do'um.	"He told him that he had to do it."
Duh him tell we say dem duh faa'muh.	"He's the one who told us that they are farmers."
De buckruh dey duh 'ood duh hunt tuckrey.	"The white man is in the woods hunting turkeys."
Alltwo dem 'ooman done fuh smaa't.	"Both those women are really smart."
Enty duh dem shum dey?	"Aren't they the ones who saw him there?"

The following story, called Brer Lion an Brer Goat, was first published in 1888 by story collector Charles Colcock Jones Jr.:

Brer Lion bin a hunt, an eh spy Brer Goat duh leddown topper er big rock duh wuk eh mout an der chaw. Eh creep up fuh ketch um. Wen eh git close ter um eh notus um good. Brer Goat keep on chaw. Brer Lion try fuh fine out wuh Brer Goat duh eat. Eh yent see nuttne nigh um ceptin de nekked rock wuh eh duh leddown on. Brer Lion stonish. Eh wait topper Brer Goat. Brer Goat keep on chaw, an chaw, an chaw. Brer Lion cant mek de ting out, an eh come close, an eh say: "Hay! Brer Goat, wuh you duh eat?" Brer Goat skade wen Brer Lion rise up befo um, but eh keep er bole harte, an eh mek ansur: "Me duh chaw dis rock, an ef you dont leff, wen me done long um me guine eat you". Dis big wud sabe Brer Goat. Bole man git outer diffikelty way coward man lose eh life.

This is a literal translation into English following Gullah grammar, including verb tense and aspect, exactly as in the original:

Brer Lion was hunting, and he spied Brer Goat lying down on top of a big rock working his mouth and chewing. He crept up to catch him. When he got close to him, he watched him good. Brer Goat kept on chewing. Brer Lion tried to find out what Brer Goat was eating. He didn't see anything near him except the naked rock which he was lying down on. Brer Lion was astonished. He waited for Brer Goat. Brer Goat kept on chewing, and chewing, and chewing. Brer Lion couldn't make the thing out, and he came close, and he said: "Hey! Brer Goat, what are you eating?" Brer Goat was scared when Brer Lion rose up before him, but he kept a bold heart, and he made (his) answer: "I am chewing this rock, and if you don't leave me (alone), when I am done with it I will eat you". This big word saved Brer Goat. A bold man gets out of difficulty where a cowardly man loses his life.

=== The Bible in Gullah ===
This passage is from the Gospel of Matthew in Gullah:

Now Jedus been bon een Betlem town, een Judea, jurin de same time wen Herod been king. Atta Jedus been bon, some wise man dem dat study bout de staa dem come ta Jerusalem fom weh dey been een de east. An dey aks say, "Weh de chile da, wa bon fa be de Jew people king? We beena see de staa wa tell bout um een de east, an we come fa woshup um op." Wen King Herod yeh dat, e been opsot fa true. An ebrybody een Jerusalem been opsot too. He call togeda all de leada dem ob de Jew priest dem an de Jew Law teacha dem. E aks um say. "Weh de Messiah gwine be bon at?" Dey tell King Herod say, "E gwine be bon een Betlem town een Judea. Cause de prophet write say [...]

Therefore when Jesus was born in Bethlehem of Judea, in the days of king Herod, lo! astronomers, came from the east to Jerusalem, and said, Where is he, that is born [the] king of Jews? for we have seen his star in the east, and we have come to worship him. But king Herod heard, and was troubled, and all Jerusalem with him. And he gathered together all the princes of priests, and scribes of the people, and inquired of them, where Christ should be born. And they said to him, In Bethlehem of Judea; for so it is written by a prophet [...]

== See also ==
- English-based creole languages
- African American studies
- African-American English
- Gullah Gullah Island
- Ian Hancock
- Valerie Boles

== Sources ==
- Christensen, Abigail 1892 (1969), Afro-American Folk Lore Told Round Cabin Fires on the Sea Islands of South Carolina, New York: Negro Universities Press.
- Gonzales, Ambrose Elliott (1969), With Aesop Along the Black Border, New York: Negro Universities Press.
- Gonzales, Ambrose Elliott (1998), The Black Border: Gullah Stories of the Carolina Coast, Gretna, Louisiana: Pelican Publishing Company.
- Jones, Charles Colcock (2000), Gullah Folktales from the Georgia Coast, Athens: University of Georgia Press.
- Parsons, Elsie Clews (1923), Folk-Lore of the Sea Islands, South Carolina, New York: American Folk-Lore Society.
- Sea Island Translation Team (2005), De Nyew Testament (The New Testament in Gullah) Open access PDF, New York: American Bible Society.
- Stoddard, Albert Henry (1995), Gullah Animal Tales from Daufuskie Island, South Carolina, Hilton Head Island, SC: Push Button Publishing Company.
- Brown, Alphonso (2008), A Gullah Guide to Charleston, The History Press.
- Chandler Harris, Joel (1879), The Story of Mr. Rabbit and Mr. Fox as Told by Uncle Remus Atlanta Constitution.
- John G. Williams: De Ole Plantation. Charleston, S. C., 1895 (Google-US)
