= Zambo =

Persons of mixed sub-Saharan African and Amerindian ancestry

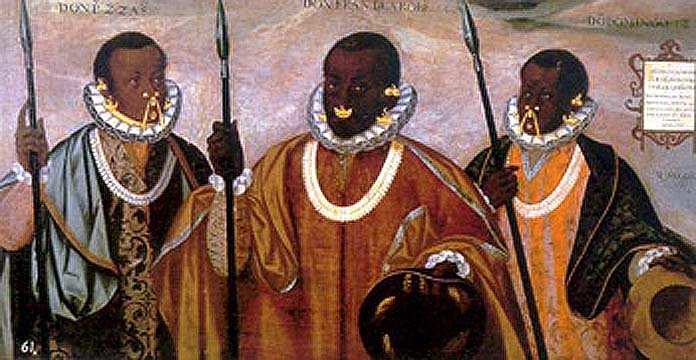
- 16th-century painting of Zambo caciques from Esmeraldas, Ecuador

Regions with significant populations
- Latin America and the Caribbean

Languages
- Spanish, Portuguese and English

Religion
- Christianity (predominantly Roman Catholic, minority practices Protestantism), African religions, tribal religions

Related ethnic groups
- Afro-Indigenous peoples, Garifuna, Africans, Afro-Caribbeans, Amerindians, Afro-Mexicans, Afro-Latin Americans

Zambo (Spanish: [ˈθambo] or [ˈsambo]) or Sambu is a racial term to refer to Afro-Indigenous peoples of mixed Amerindian and sub-Saharan African ancestry.

The equivalent term in Brazil is cafuzo (Portuguese: [kɐˈfuzu]). However, in Portugal and Portuguese-speaking Africa, cafuzo is used to refer to someone born of an African person and a person of mixed African and European ancestry.

== Background ==
The word is believed to have originated from one of the Romance languages or Latin and its direct descendants. The feminine word is zamba (not to be confused with the Argentine Zamba folk dance.)

In some parts of colonial Spanish America, the term zambo applied to the children of one African and one Amerindian parent, or the children of two zambo parents. In New Spain (colonial Mexico), the term for those of mixed African and indigenous ancestry was lobo ("wolf"). This term of classification appears in official marriage registers and other official documentation.

During this period, many other terms denoted individuals of African-Amerindian ancestry in ratios smaller or greater than the 50:50 of zambos: cambujo (zambo-Amerindian mixture) for example. Today in parts of Spanish America, zambo refers to all people with significant or visible amounts of both African and Amerindian ancestry.

== History ==
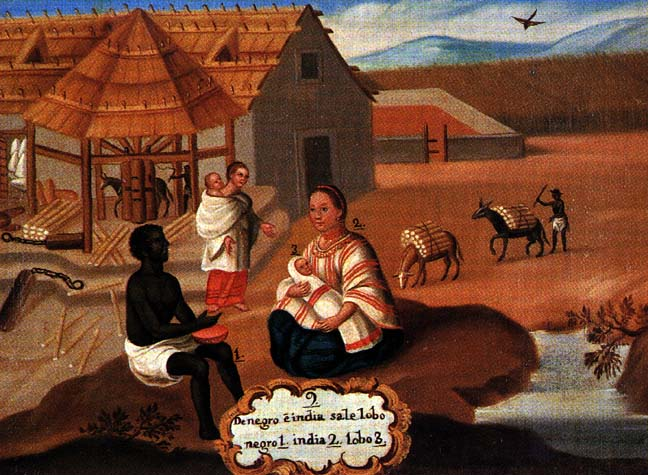
A representation of an infant zambo, in an 18th-century "Pintura de Castas" from New Spain. The painting illustrates "from an African and an Amerindian produces a lobo", here a synonym for zambo.

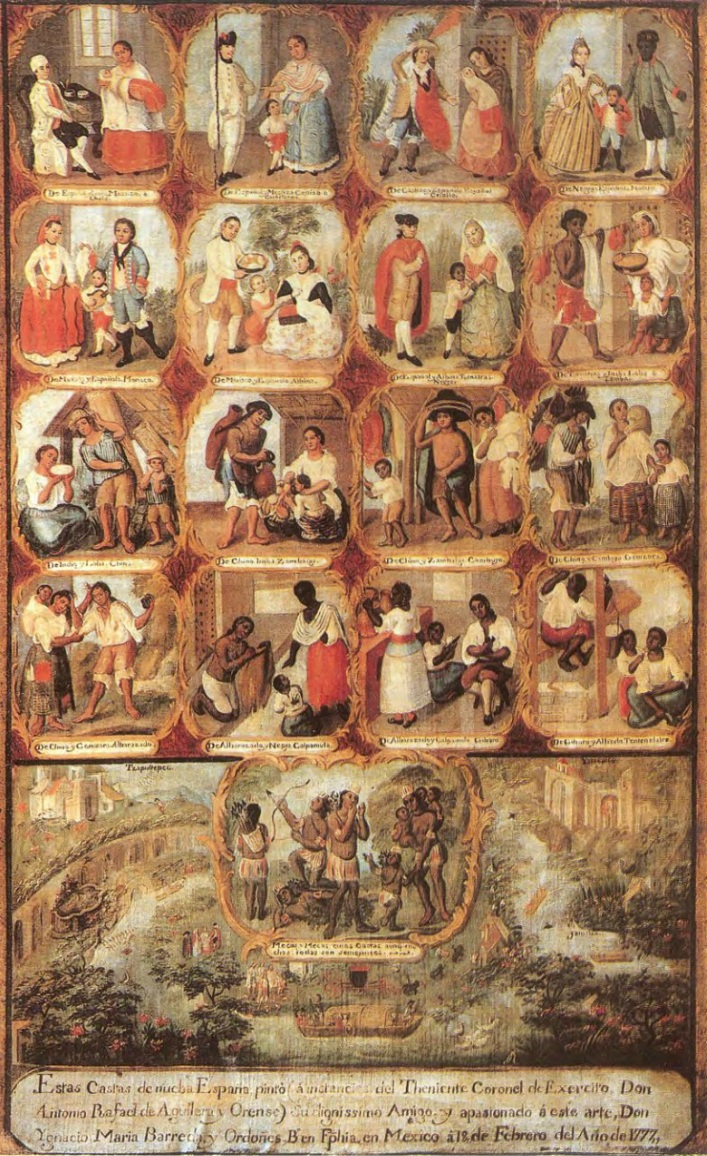
Casta painting showing 16 hierarchically arranged, mixed-race groupings. Row 2, extreme right cell, shows the torna atrás father, Indian mother, and Lobo or Zambo offspring. Ignacio Maria Barreda, 1777. Real Academia Española, Madrid.

The term zambo was not formally used in Spanish territories. Competing terms, such as mulato, were also used. From the beginning the early sixteenth century, when African slaves were first imported to Hispaniola, unions between them and indigenous peoples, and Spanish colonists, began to take place. The two non-European groups sometimes worked together in the mines or on the plantations of Hispaniola, and on other Spanish Caribbean islands following the introduction of sugar cane production in the 1520s. In other cases, Africans took refuge in indigenous communities after escaping slavery.

The term zambos was generally used to refer to persons who did not have European ancestry, but all sorts of unions took place through the centuries, of course. In the eighteenth century, the Spanish began making formal racial classifications, and defined zambo in what became its final, official meaning.

Some zambo groups became well known after being created by runaway or rebel Africans who mixed with or took over indigenous communities. In the unconquered regions of Esmeraldes, in what would become Ecuador, for example, a small group of shipwrecked former slaves gained control of some indigenous communities, eventually representing them before Spanish authorities in the late sixteenth and early seventeenth centuries.

The Misquito Zambos developed as the descendants of a group of African slaves who revolted in 1640 on a slave ship. They wrecked it at Cape Gracias a Dios on the border between Honduras and Nicaragua, to escape into the interior. There they united with the indigenous Miskito people. By the early eighteenth century, Afro-Miskito people came to dominate the kingdom. They led warriors on many extensive slave raids to capture slaves for sale to Europeans. Their alliance and protection of English-speaking merchants and settlers in the area helped Great Britain found the colony of British Honduras (present day Belize).

== Today ==
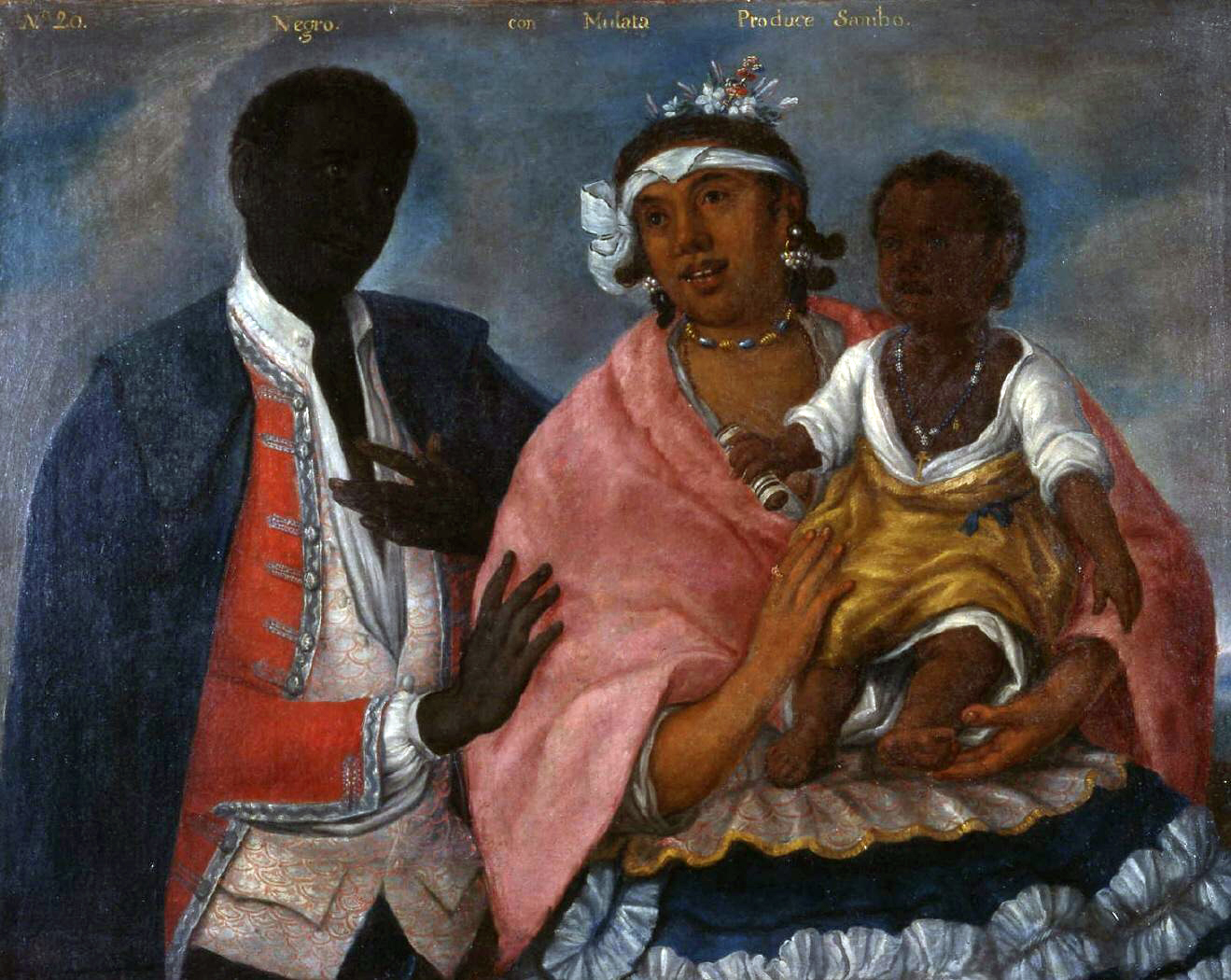
"From a black man with a mulata produces a Sambo," Indian school, 1770.

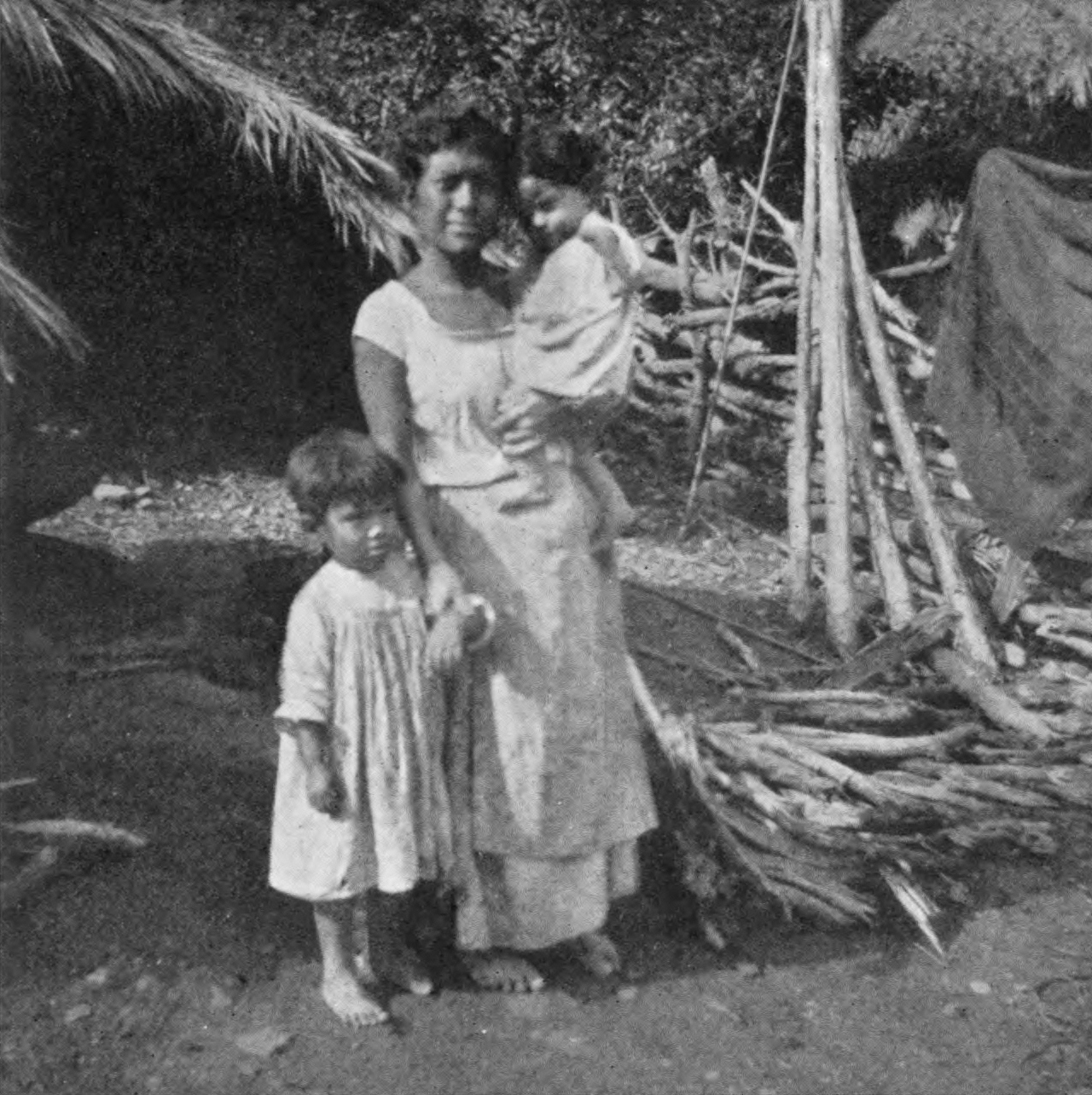
"Zamba of Mezquititlán", c. 1908

Officially, zambos represent sizeable minorities in the northwestern South American countries of Colombia, Brazil, Venezuela, Guyana, and Ecuador, as well as in the Central American country of Panama. A small, but noticeable number of zambos, resulting from recent unions of Amerindian men to Afro-Ecuadorian women, and they are common in major coastal cities of Ecuador and in Imbabura province. Prior to rural-to-urban migration in Ecuador, Afro-Ecuadorians were mostly confined to the Esmeraldas Province and the Chota Valley in Imbabura Province. A 2021 genetic study in the journal Human Genetics and Genomic Advances showed that the average Afro-Ecuadorian carries significantly higher amounts of Amerindian ancestry than all other Afro-latino groups to the north of the country, with an average of 35.86% Amerindian heritage.

In Central America, two indigenous-African mixed groups have developed: the Miskito and the Garifuna. The Garifuna originated from the combination of Africans who were shipwrecked or fled from neighboring islands to St. Vincent during the 17th and the 19l8th centuries. In 1797, they were deported by the British for supporting France during the French Revolutionary Wars to the island of Roatan, off the coast of Honduras. From there, they reached the mainland and developed communities along the coast of Central America from Nicaragua to Belize.

In Mexico, where zambos were sometimes known as lobos (literally meaning wolves), they form a sizeable minority. According to the 2015 Intercensus Estimate, 896,829 people identified as both Afro-Mexican and Indigenous Mexican. The vast majority of the country's Afro-descended population has been absorbed into the wider mestizo population. Greater concentrations can be found only in communities scattered around the southern coastal states, including Michoacán, Guerrero, Oaxaca, Campeche, Quintana Roo, Yucatán, and Veracruz, where many of the country's Afro-Mexicans reside.

Culturally, Mexican lobos followed Amerindian traditions, rather than African influences, as they often had Amerindian mothers and were brought up in her culture. Such acculturation also took place in Bolivia, where the Afro-Bolivian community absorbed and retained many aspects of Amerindian cultural influences, such as dress and the use of the Aymara language. Those communities of Afro-Bolivians reside in the Yungas region of the Bolivian department of La Paz.

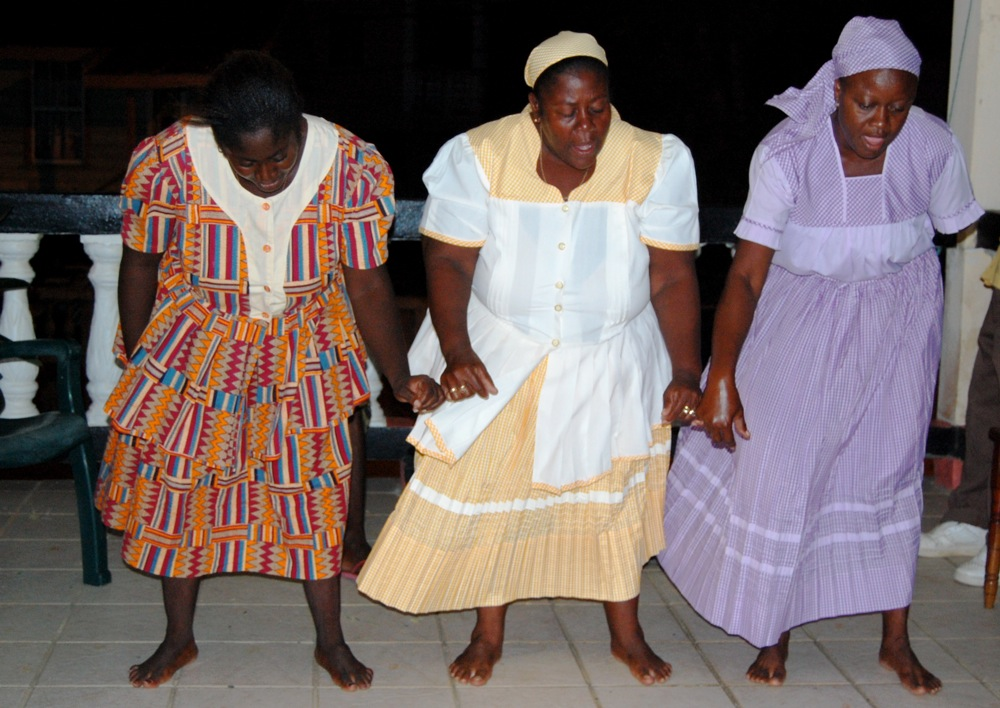
Under the old-fashioned term "zambo," the Garifuna are "zambos" (mixed-race Amerindians and Africans).

== Racism and discrimination ==
The populations of African and Amerindian ancestry have generally been marginalized and discriminated against.

== See also ==
- Afro-Indigenous peoples
- Afro-Asians
- Afro-Latin Americans
- Black Indians
- Black Seminoles
- Casta
- Cocoa panyols
- Cholo
- Garifuna people
- Lobo (racial category)
- Marabou
- Mestee
- Indigenous peoples of the Americas
- Mestizo
- Miskito
- Miscegenation
- Mulatto
- List of topics related to the African diaspora
- Miskito Sambu
