= Ethnology (journal) =

- Discipline: Ethnology
- Language: English
- Edited by: Leonard Plotnicov

Publication details
- History: 1932-2012
- Publisher: University of Pittsburgh (United States of America)
- Frequency: Quarterly

Standard abbreviations
- ISO 4: Ethnology

Indexing
- ISSN: 0014-1828

Links
- Journal homepage; Online access

Ethnology was a journal founded in 1962 by George Peter Murdock, published by the University of Pittsburgh. It was specialized in ethnographic articles and cross-cultural studies. It was discontinued in 2012.

The journal was published quarterly, and its online archive, available to subscribers, offers all 50 annual volumes published up to and including the end of 2011. Each issue was available in open access format 36 months after publication.
