= Abigail Mandana Holmes Christensen =

American Folklore collector

Abigail Mandana Holmes Christensen (c. 1852–1938) was an American collector of folklore.

== Biography ==
Abigail ("Abbie") Christensen was born in Massachusetts to abolitionist parents, her family later moved to South Carolina. She investigated the African origin of the folklore recorded in the region, forwarding selections to newspapers and journals, she eventually published several works on African-American tales and dialect. Christensen was, for a short time, a member of the American Folklore Society and published in its journal. She sympathised with contemporary movements concerning temperance, protest on inequality, and other socialist causes, but gave special regard to the plight of the peoples from whom she gathered her material. Her major work was Afro-American folk lore: told round cabin fires on the Sea Islands of South Carolina, Christensen intended that profits from this be used to advance African American equality and self-determination, she assisted in the funding of the Port Royal Agricultural School for this purpose. Christensen's paper on African-American spirituals and shouts was read to attendees at the World's Columbian Exposition.
