= Chickasaw Freedmen =

Formerly enslaved African Americans

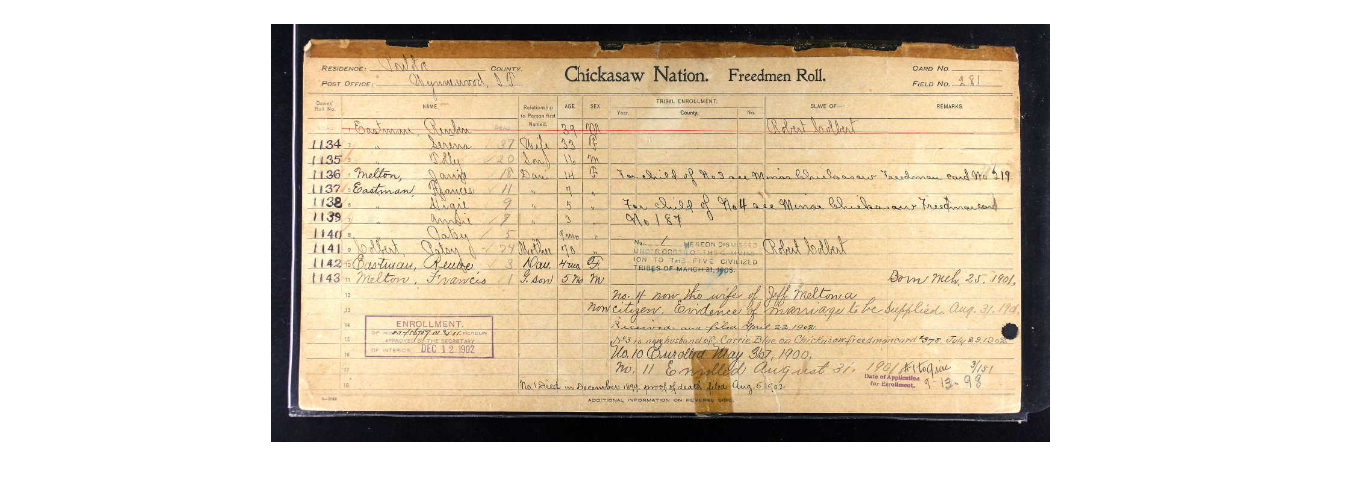
Chickasaw Freedmen Roll listing Janie Melton, the mother of Roy Milton.

The Chickasaw Freedmen are individuals, formerly enslaved in the Chickasaw Nation and freed in 1866, and their descendants. They have African ancestry, and many also have Chickasaw ancestry. The Chickasaw Nation never adopted Chickasaw Freedmen as Chickasaw Nation citizens. Today, descendants of the Chickasaw Freedmen on the Dawes Rolls are not eligible for citizenship within the Chickasaw Nation.

== Terminology ==
"Freedmen" is one of the terms given to emancipated slaves and their descendants after slavery was abolished in the United States following the American Civil War. In this context, "Chickasaw Freedmen" refers to the African American people who were enslaved by Chickasaw people before 1866. It includes the descendants of such former slaves and the term "Chickasaw Freedmen descendants" is also sometimes used to identify contemporary members of the group.

== Legal status ==
The Chickasaw Freedmen are not and have never been Chickasaw Nation citizens. Under the July 12, 1861 Treaty with Choctaws and Chickasaws, it was stipulated that the Chickasaw Nation would adopt the Chickasaw Freedmen as citizens, but that was not implemented. In 1904, the Supreme Court of the United States ruled that the Chickasaw Freedmen were not eligible for Chickasaw Nation citizenship under the 1866 treaty as the provision in the treaty that they be provided citizenship was never implemented.

Between 1866 and 1907, when the Oklahoma Territory became the US state of Oklahoma, the Chickasaw Freedmen were stateless people, as they did not have citizenship in either the United States or the Chickasaw Nation.

In 2021, the United States House Committee on Financial Services threatened to withhold tens of millions of dollars from the Chickasaw Nation and several other tribes if they did not accept Chickasaw Freedmen as Chickasaw Nation citizens under the stipulations of the 1866 treaty.

As of November, 2025, the Constitution of the Chickasaw Nation defines citizenship by blood and by lineal descent from the Dawes Rolls, thereby excluding Chickasaw Freedmen from eligibility for citizenship. Article II – Citizenship of the Chickasaw Constitution states, "This Chickasaw Nation shall consist of all Chickasaw Indians by blood whose names appear on the final rolls of the Chickasaw Nation...and their lineal descendants."

As non-citizens, Chickasaw Freedmen are not considered part of the tribe and do not have access to tribal resources such as education, healthcare, or housing.

== Notable Chickasaw Freedmen ==
Notable Chickasaw Freedmen and their descendants:

- Roy Milton, singer and musician

== See also ==
- Black Indians in the United States
- Native American Freedmen
  - Cherokee Freedmen
  - Choctaw Freedmen
  - Muscogee Freedmen
  - Seminole Freedmen
