= Afro-Seminole Creole =

Creole spoken in Southern US

- Native to: United States, Mexico
- Ethnicity: Black Seminoles, Mascogos
- Native speakers: (200 in Mexico cited 1990)
- Language family: English-African Creole: Guinea Coast Creole English; Caribbean English Creole; Eastern Caribbean; Gullah–Nevis–Antigua; Bahamian–Gullah; Gullah; Afro-Seminole Creole

Language codes
- ISO 639-3: afs
- Glottolog: afro1254
- Linguasphere: 52-ABB-ac

Bertha speaking Seminole Creole

Afro-Seminole Creole (ASC) is an English-based creole language historically spoken by Black Seminoles. A close relative of Gullah, today it is in use in Black Seminole communities in the United States states of Oklahoma and Texas and the Mexican state of Coahuila.

== History ==
Afro-Seminole Creole is closely related to the Gullah language, spoken today by some Gullah people in parts of coastal South Carolina and Georgia but once spoken widely from North Carolina to northern Florida. Many enslaved Africans, including speakers of Gullah, who escaped from plantations in the British colonies of the Carolinas and Georgia made their way to Spanish Florida from the 17th into the 19th century. Some came to the emerging Seminole nation, becoming the Black Seminole.

Afro-Seminole and Gullah became separated after Florida became a U.S. territory and most Black Seminole were forced out. After the U.S. takeover in 1821, some Black Seminole departed for the Bahamas, Cuba and the Cherokee lands, and most of the rest were forced west by Indian removal and the Seminole Wars of the 1830s through the 1850s. In the west, Black Seminole settled with the Indian Seminole in the central Indian Territory. In 1849, part of the Black Seminole moved to the Mexican state of Coahuila, ultimately settling in El Nacimiento where they became known as the Mascogos. In 1870, the U.S. Army recruited the Black Seminoles of El Nacimiento to serve as scouts in the Texas–Indian wars; while some later returned to El Nacimiento, Black Seminole Scouts remained in the area of Fort Clark settled in the area of Brackettville, Texas. It is in these three areas where Afro-Seminole Creole is spoken today.

The Black Seminole historically avoided using their distinct creole language around outsiders, to the point that its existence was unknown to even close associates until some members began revealing it in 1976. While outsiders had commented on the speech of Black Seminoles earlier, they identified this as similar to English or African American English spoken elsewhere. Linguistic study since the 1970s identified Afro-Seminole Creole as a unique language related to Gullah. Today Afro-Seminole Creole is spoken mostly by elder members of the tribe, with younger generations in Oklahoma and Texas speaking only English and in those in Coahuila mostly transitioning to Spanish.

== Present day ==
The present-day speakers of Afro-Seminole Creole live in Seminole County, Oklahoma, and Brackettville, Texas, in the United States, and in Nacimiento de los Negros, Coahuila, Mexico. ASC is threatened with extinction as there are only about 200 native speakers today.

== See also ==
- Black Seminoles
- Gullah language
- Ian Hancock
- Kongo language
- Krio language
- Lorenzo Dow Turner
- Mascogos
- Muskogean languages
- Seminole
