= Afro-Indigenous people in Canada =

People in Canada of combined African and Indigenous ancestry and identity

Afro-Indigenous peoples in Canada (also known as Indigenous-Black peoples) are individuals and communities of both African and Indigenous identity on the territory of present-day Canada. The terminology emphasizes survival and identity within a settler colonial framework, rather than a simple mixture of two ethnic categories.

As in the rest of the Americas, Afro-Indigeneity has a longstanding presence in Canada rooted in both the arrival of Africans to North America and their relationships with First Nations, Inuit, and Métis peoples.

== History ==
People of African origin have been present in the lands now called Canada for over 400 years. Relationships between African and Indigenous peoples formed through patterns of migration, settlement, and shared resistance to colonial oppression. Historic Black communities in Atlantic Canada, particularly in Nova Scotia and New Brunswick, are among the earliest sites of Afro-Indigenous connections. Scholars note that urban centres such as Toronto and Halifax are historically important sites where Indigenous and Black communities converged under colonial rule, contributing to mixed Indigenous-Black identities.

Slavery in New France and British colonies included both Indigenous and African people. In New France, enslaved people were present from the 17th century; one early recorded case is that of Olivier Le Jeune, a boy of African descent enslaved and buried in Québec in 1654. Between 1629 and 1834, over 4,000 Africans were enslaved in the French and British colonies in Eastern Canada.

During and after the American Revolutionary War, thousands of Black Loyalists migrated to Nova Scotia and other British North American territories. They settled in communities such as Birchtown and Shelburne. These Black Loyalist communities often interacted with Indigenous peoples in the region. Oral histories and archival evidence suggest intermarriage between Black Loyalists and Mi’kmaq peoples in Atlantic Canada. Scholars have also noted agricultural and settlement patterns that suggest cooperation and intermarriage between Jamaican Maroons and Mi'kmaq people in the province. Black–Mi’kmaq family lines can be found in areas including Gibson Woods, Dartmouth, and Halifax.

Historical records also document Afro-Indigenous people living in Southern Ontario during the nineteenth century. At Six Nations of the Grand River, census records from 1851 to 1901 indicate that Black people held property and intermarried with Haudenosaunee families, particularly the Tuscarora. Examples included the Groat, Nash, Douglas, Walker, Johnston and Shuler families. By 1901, some individuals of mixed ancestry were recorded solely as "Indian", suggesting they may have assimilated into the community entirely. Mixed families have also been documented in the Anderdon area of Essex County, which was formerly reserve land that absorbed many Black families from the US. The Nolan, Walls, and Maulder families later became prominent Afro-Indigenous farming families in the area.

Children of such unions often faced complex legal recognition under colonial and later Canadian law. The Indian Act of 1876 and its amendments restricted Indigenous identity and band membership, which meant some Afro-Indigenous children were excluded from status or membership despite their ancestry. Afro-Indigenous identity was often constrained or erased by policies that defined belonging through paternal descent, blood quantum, or administrative records.

== Demographics ==
According to the 2021 Canadian Census, about 9,465 individuals identifying as Black reported at least one North American Indigenous ethnic or cultural origin. Of these responses:

- 94.5% were multiple-origin responses, where Indigenous ancestry was given alongside African, Caribbean, or other origins.
- 5.3% were single-origin responses in which Indigenous ancestry was the only ethnic origin reported.
- 93.3% were born in Canada, while 6.3% were U.S. born.

The specific Indigenous ancestries most frequently reported include: Mi’kmaq (975), Cherokee (550), & Cree (390). Other ancestries reported in smaller numbers include Blackfoot, Mohawk, and Ojibway.

== Present day ==
Recent scholarship on Afro-Indigenous peoples has been developed through the community-based research project Proclaiming Our Roots (POR), led by Afro-Indigenous scholars and community members. POR employs methods such as digital oral storytelling, community mapping, and sharing circles to document Afro-Indigenous experiences.

Scholars and activists have argued that increasingly strict identity protocols within Indigenous communities and governments, introduced to address cases of false claims to Indigeneity, can inadvertently marginalize Afro-Indigenous people. Community reports have also highlighted Afro-Indigenous peoples’ disproportionate exposure to gender-based violence, shaped by the intersection of colonialism, racism, and sexism.

== Notable people ==
- Jahkeele Marshall-Rutty, professional soccer player for Toronto FC
- Julian Taylor, musician
- Eric Schweig, actor

== See also ==
- Black Indians in the United States
- Black Canadians
- Indigenous peoples in Canada
- African Nova Scotians
- Métis in Canada
