= Mascogos =

Afrodescendant group in Coahuila, Mexico

Total population
- Throughout Coahuila (2020)

Regions with significant populations
- Múzquiz, Coahuila, Mexico

Languages
- Mexican Spanish, Afro-Seminole Creole

Religion
- predominantly Catholic

Related ethnic groups
- African-Americans, Creek Freedmen, Black Seminoles, Gullah, Biloxi

The Mascogos (also known as negros mascagos) are an Afro-descendant group in Coahuila, Mexico. Centered on the town of El Nacimiento in Múzquiz Municipality, the group are descendants of Black Seminoles escaping the threat of slavery in the United States.

== History ==
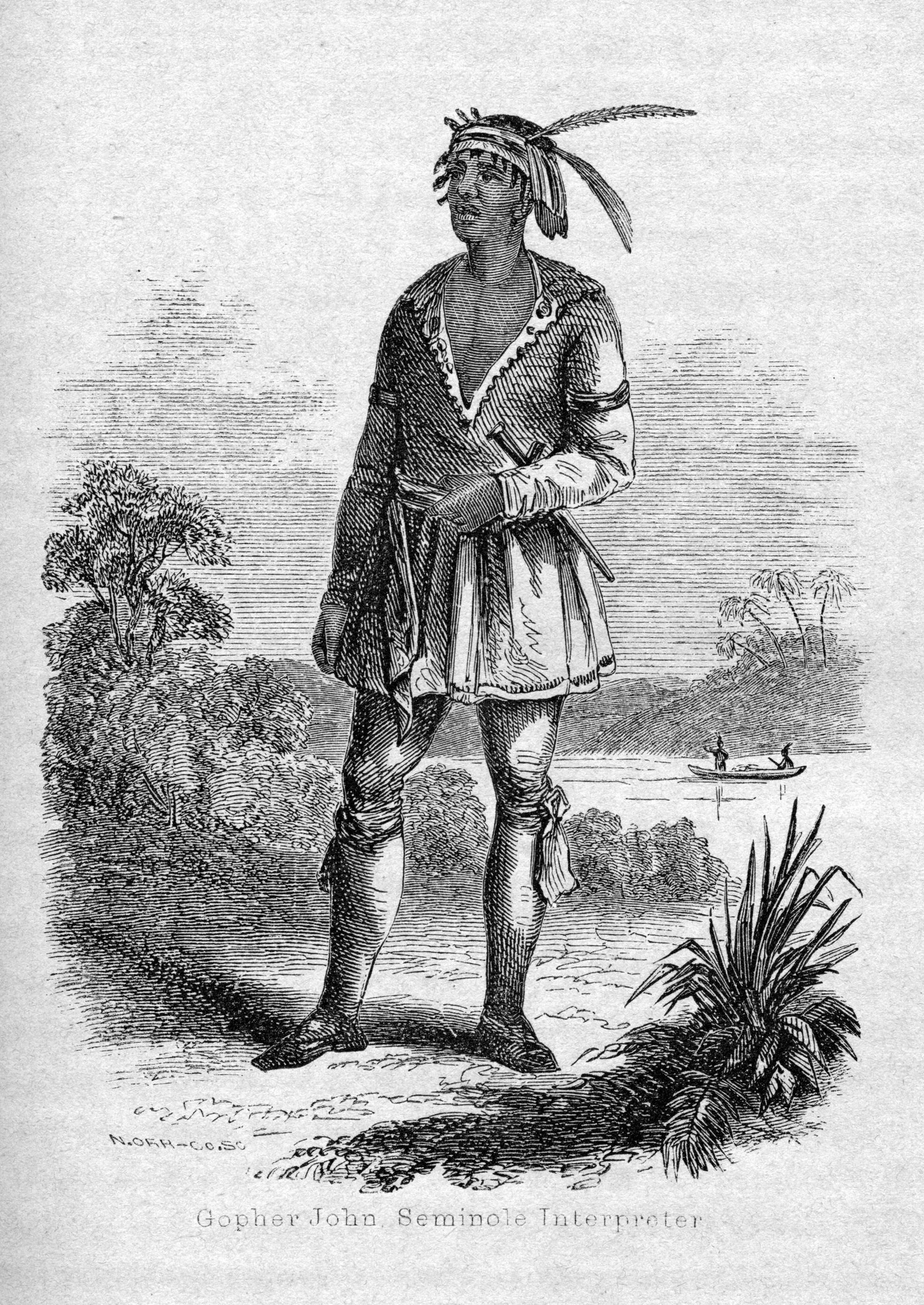
An 1858 depiction of John Horse, also known as Juan Caballo

After the forced relocation of the Seminoles and Black Seminoles from Florida to Indian Territory, a group led by Seminole sub-chief Wild Cat and Black Seminole chief John Horse moved to northern Mexico. The group settled at El Nacimiento in 1852. They worked for the Mexican government to protect against Indian raids. Many of the Seminoles died from smallpox and many of those remaining eventually returned to the United States along with some of the Black Seminoles.

Mascogo oral tradition indicates that the group potentially absorbed remnants of the Biloxi people, fleeing to Coahuila to avoid encroachment by Anglo-American settlers.

In May 2017, the Governor of Coahuila Rubén Moreira Valdez signed a decree that recognized the tribu de los negros mascogos as a "pueblo indígena de Coahuila". He said that he hopes the Mascogos can begin receiving funds from the Instituto Nacional de Pueblos Indígenas by 2018. Moreira Valdez also highlighted that the history of the Mascogos, Kickapoo and Chinese immigrants were now included in the state's history textbooks.

== Culture ==
Mascogo may derive from Muscogee. The capeyuye, religious songs accompanied by hand clapping, are performed at funerals, New Years and Christmas. In 2015, a capeyuye album titled Mascogo Soul featuring four Mascogo matriarchs was published.

The Mascogos celebrate Juneteenth. During the festivities, the community is visited by family members and Black Seminoles from Brackettville, Texas. Mascogo traditional dishes include soske (a type of atole), tetapún (bread made from camote), pumpkin or piloncillo empanadas and pan de mortero.

The traditional costume of the Mascogo women is a long, polka-dotted dress, an apron and a kerchief tied around the head. As of 2016, the only "pure Mascogo" was 85-year old Lucía Vázquez, a result of frequent out-marriage in the community. According to Homero Vásquez, an elderly Mascogo whose mother was from Chihuahua, starting in the 1930s there was an influx of farmers to the region resulting in an increase of marriage with outsiders. There is significant migration to other parts of Mexico and the United States of the young people of El Nacimiento due to a lack of opportunities. Afro-Seminole Creole is used for the capeyuye and is spoken mostly by the elderly.

== See also ==
- Mexican Kickapoo, band of the Kickapoo tribe that also settled in El Nacimiento
- Cherokee Nation of Mexico
- American immigration to Mexico
