= Choctaw Freedmen =

Afro-Indigenous ethnocultural group subject to long-term tribal membership dispute

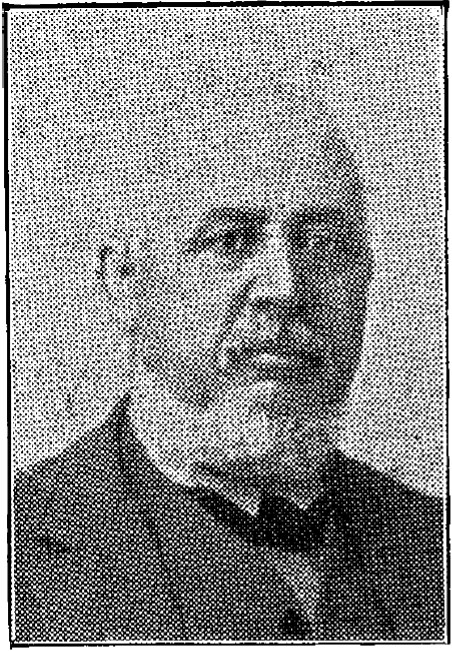
Henry Crittenden, who was born into slavery in the Choctaw Nation but was emancipated.

The Choctaw Freedmen are former enslaved African and African Americans who were emancipated and granted citizenship in the Choctaw Nation after the Civil War, according to the tribe's new peace treaty of 1866 with the United States. The term also applies to their contemporary descendants.

Similarly to some other "American Indian" tribes, the Choctaw had customarily held other Indigenous people hostage and at times, negotiated them to be sold through contracts of indentured servitude. The enslaved individuals were at times taken initially as captives from warfare. As they adopted elements of European culture, such as larger farms and plantations, the elite began to adapt their system to purchasing and holding chattel slave workers of African-American and Indigenous descent. Moshulatubbee held slaves, as did many of the European men, generally fur traders, who married into the Choctaw nation. The Folsom and Greenwood LeFlore families were wealthy Choctaw planters who held the most slaves at the time of Indian Removal and afterward. After signing the treaty for Removal, LeFlore withdrew from the Choctaw Nation to stay in Mississippi and take US and state citizenship. He owned 15,000 acres of plantation and 400 enslaved African Americans.

Following the American Civil War, the United States negotiated the Treaty of 1866 with the Choctaw and Chickasaw Nations as part of Reconstruction. The treaty abolished slavery within both nations and established a process concerning their former enslaved populations. Article 3 provided that the Choctaw and Chickasaw legislatures could enact laws granting qualifying Freedmen citizenship rights within two years. If they did not, the United States agreed to remove those Freedmen who wished to leave the nations and use funds associated with the cession of the Leased District for their benefit. The Choctaw Nation did not enact the citizenship provisions within the two-year period, and Choctaw officials initially declined adoption and requested that the United States carry out the treaty's removal provisions. The federal government did not fully implement that provision.

In 1883, the Choctaw General Council passed An Act to Adopt the Freedmen of the Choctaw Nation, granting qualifying Choctaw Freedmen and their descendants citizenship rights within the nation.

The current Constitution of the Choctaw Nation of Oklahoma, ratified by Choctaw voters in 1983, defines membership as "Choctaw Indians by blood whose names appear on the final rolls of the Choctaw Nation" and their lineal descendants. During enrollment by the Dawes Commission, individuals were classified on separate rolls, including citizens by blood, intermarried citizens, and Freedmen. The Oklahoma Historical Society states that the Dawes Commission typically enrolled individuals of mixed African and Native ancestry as Freedmen and recorded no Indian blood quantum for them. Under the Choctaw Nation's current membership requirements, descendants whose connection to the Nation is solely through an ancestor enrolled as a Choctaw Freedmen are not eligible for tribal membership. The citizenship status of Choctaw Freedmen remains disputed; advocates have argued that the Treaty of 1866 guarantees citizenship rights, while the Choctaw Nation's Constitution requires descent from a Choctaw by blood enrollee. As of 2025, no tribal or federal court had directly ruled on whether Choctaw Freedmen descendants are entitled to Choctaw citizenship under the Treaty of 1866.

== Slavery ==
Prior to European colonization, the Choctaw, in line with the customs of other indigenous tribes of the American Southeast, were accustomed to taking captives in warfare. The captives would then either be enslaved or adopted by a family to replace a family member who had died. As European colonists began to settle the region in the 17th and 18th centuries, they began to purchase Indian slaves to use as workers. Tribes in the region intensified their raids on enemy villages in order to acquire captives with the specific intent of selling them to the colonists in major slave-trading centers such as New Orleans and Charles Town. Many tribes undertook such raids in order to satisfy outstanding debts they had acquired with colonial merchants in South Carolina, an issue which contributed to the eruption of the Yamasee War (1715–1717).

The history of the descendants of African and American-Indian people has been complicated because individuals have had different experiences and status in the tribes. Some Afro-Indian descendants do not identify with their Native ancestry because they were reared in more exclusively African-American environments. Others are reluctant to share stories of mixed ancestry, because of their complicated history. Others fear backlash from both African American and Native American communities, who sometimes reject those of mixed race. Others don't know anything about the hidden side of mixed ancestry. These people of African ancestry lived and cultivated among Native Americans.

Reports indicated that Choctaw slaveholders frequently mistreated their enslaved. Enslaved peoples, especially those who were of mixed Choctaw descent, were sometimes whipped or burned for minor offenses. Records from the period also describe instances of resistance among the enslaved; in one account, an enslaved man named Prince was angered that his Choctaw owner, Richard Harkins, failed to allow his slaves to celebrate Christmas in 1858. Prince murdered Harkins and dumped his body in a nearby river. Barbara Krauthamer says that such accounts highlighted the intersections of race, gender, and power relations that informed the interactions between “Black slaves and Indian masters” in Indian Territory.

=== Social structure ===
The Freedmen had an ambiguous role within the Choctaw Nation. During the first decade of the twentieth century, Choctaw communal lands were allotted to households of tribal members prior to the dissolution of the Choctaw Nation government to extinguish land claims, and incorporation of the territory into the new state of Oklahoma. Tribal members were registered as Choctaw by blood, but most Freedmen were classified as Black if they had visibly African features. They did not share equally with By Blood Choctaws in the allotment of Choctaw lands and resources.

During the following decades, the Choctaw Freedmen continued to face considerable discrimination in terms of social identity and political legislation. While by the late twentieth century, the Choctaw had considered accepting mixed-race Choctaw of partial white ancestry as Indian citizens, they continued to classify Choctaw Freedmen strictly as descendants of African Americans.

=== Government involvement ===
According to People's World, the United States government supported slavery among the tribes in Southeastern United States in order to have the native populations assimilate with white settlers. By adopting slavery, the tribes would no longer protect enslaved African Americans who fled as refugees from plantations. This view does not have consensus among historians.

Before introducing black slavery, colonists had attempted to enslave indigenous people in early 1760s. However, smallpox killed 30% of the total indigenous population - which left the slavery system ineffective. Additionally, given that the indigenous inhabitants were on their own land and knew it better than the colonists, escape was far easier for them.

In the 17th century the incorporation of race-based slavery became an efficient alternative for wealthy members of the Choctaw Nation to maintain an increasingly tenuous hold on political and cultural autonomy against Western expansion, while it allowed them to pursue economic and diplomatic goals that benefited them. African slavery among the Choctaws was a growing and widely accepted institution but it differed from Southern slavery in that it was normally not practiced for profit. Rather, the Choctaw held slaves in order to avoid doing agricultural work themselves. In addition, the Choctaw were aware that if they manumitted (freed) their slaves, the bordering slave states of Texas and Arkansas might overrun their nation to eliminate a local safe haven for runaways.

== Education ==
The Choctaw Nation adopted European-style schoolhouse education before removal and established schools in Oklahoma territory shortly after arriving in Indian Territory. This included a network of boarding schools as well as neighborhood day schools. These schools variably included missionary support. Though there were no schools for slaves or free Black people in Indian territory until after the Civil War, the adoption of freedmen as citizens in 1883 in accordance with the Treaty of 1866 meant that the Nation was legally responsible for the education of these new citizens.

By 1888, the peak of the Choctaw Nation's school system, twenty-nine of the one-hundred-and-sixty neighborhood schools in operation by the Nation were for freedmen citizens. The Nation operated a boarding school for Choctaw freedmen called Tushka Lusa Academy from 1892 to 1900. This school ceased operations shortly before the expansive Choctaw Nation school system began to collapse following the passage of the Curtis Act and the beginning of the United States’ termination policy. Additionally, a Choctaw freedmen community near present-day Valliant, Oklahoma organized a boarding school called Oak Hill Industrial Academy. This school was not supported by the nation and was not affected by the Curtis Act. The founders of Oak Hill instead sought support from the Presbyterian Board of Missions for Freedmen, who funded the school until the 1930s.

== Post-Dawes Commission ==
In 1894, the Dawes Commission was established to register Choctaw and other families of the Indian Territory so that each tribe's communal lands could be allotted among its heads of households. The final list included 18,981 citizens of the Choctaw Nation, 1,639 Mississippi Choctaw, and 5,994 former slaves (and descendants of former slaves), most of them associated with Choctaw in the Indian/Oklahoma Territory. Following completion of the land allotments, the US proposed to end the tribal governments of the Five Civilized Tribes and to admit the two territories jointly as a state.

The direct "articles of the allotment" rules were published in The Daily Ardmorite; details spanned the entire front page of the newspaper. The rules brought up the issue of identify, and affected more than land distribution. For instance, in February 1896, Susan Brashears came before the Commissioner to the Five Civilized Tribes in Muskogee, in order to request that her four children be placed on the Dawes Rolls as Choctaw Indian "by blood". Their father was her former husband Oliver Stock (or Boss) McCoy, a recognized and enrolled Choctaw citizen; he was of mixed Choctaw and white ancestry, with a Choctaw mother. Their children had been recorded on the 1885 census as half-Choctaw and full citizens because of their father's status. But Brashears's appeal was rejected.

According to the 1897 deal between the Dawes Commission and the Choctaw Nation, the tribal government would allot the tribal land and divide it among its citizens. That was approximately 15,000 Choctaws, 5,000 Freedmen, and 1,500 intermarried white citizens. Both the Choctaw and intermarried white citizens would receive 320 acres of land per household on average, while Freedmen were allotted less than 40 acres per household. Susan's attempt to be recognized as a full-blooded Choctaw was turned down. In doing so the council rejected the possibility of her having Indian blood, due to her mother's classification as black, but she may have been of mixed ancestry.

The federal Stigler Act of 1947 directed that protected allotted lands of members of the Five Tribes must be owned by someone with a quantum of at least 1/2 native blood in order for it to remain under federal protections. If land was passed to a relative with less than 1/2 native blood, the land had to be taken out of federal protection. This requirement resulted in tribal members losing land that in some cases their families had farmed or had ranches on for generations. But in 2018, both the House and Senate voted unanimously for an amendment to remove that blood quantum requirement for the Five Tribes. This change put them on the same basis as other tribal members in Oklahoma. It enables enrolled tribal members to preserve family lands under federal protection.

In a 2018 interview, US Representative Markwayne Mullin (Cherokee) (R-OK) who co-sponsored the bill with Tom Cole (Chickasaw)(R-OK), said that the last person in his family who met the blood quantum criterion was his great-aunt, even though his family still owned and farmed the land their ancestors had farmed and been allotted. He noted that the amended Stigler Act put the Five Tribes on the same basis as others in Oklahoma, allowing them to retain allotted lands in protected status and thus strengthen families and the tribes.

In 2007 Principal Chief George Wickliffe of United Keetoowah Band Of Cherokee had expressed his concern about what he viewed as threats to sovereignty for all tribes because of the Cherokee Nation's freedmen controversy. He believed that the Cherokee Nation's refusal to abide by the Treaty of 1866 was a threat to the government-to-government relationships of all Native tribes.

== See also ==
- Black Indians in the United States
- Cherokee Freedmen
- Chickasaw Freedmen
- Muscogee Freedmen
- Black Seminoles
- Oak Hill Industrial Academy
