= Muscogee Freedmen =

Muscogee formerly enslaved people and their descendants

Muscogee Freedmen (also known as Creek Freedmen, Creek: pucas-seko hakvtē) is a term for Muscogee people of African descent who were enslaved by Indigenous Muscogee people before 1866. It also refers to the descendants of the original Muscogee Freedmen. The enslaved were emancipated under the Muscogee Nation's 1866 treaty with the United States following the American Civil War, during which the tribe's government had allied with the Confederate States of America. Freedmen who wished to stay in the Creek Nation in Indian Territory, with whom they often had blood relatives, were to be granted full citizenship in the Creek Nation under the Treaty of 1866.

Many of the African Americans had removed with the Muscogee from the American Southeast in the 1830s, and lived and worked the land since. At the time of the war and since, many Muscogee Freedmen were of partial Muscogee descent by blood. Registration of tribal members under the Dawes Commission often failed to record such ancestry. In 1979, the Creek Nation changed its membership rules, requiring all members to prove descent to persons listed as "Indian by Blood" on the Dawes Rolls. In July 2025, the Muscogee Nation Supreme Court struck "by blood" requirements from the nation's constitution and ordered the Muscogee Nation Citizenship Board to begin enrolling Muscogee Freedmen.

== History ==
Muscogee Freedmen were people of African descent held in slavery by some Muscogee Nation citizens prior to the American Civil War. Before European contact, slavery was a war practice of the Muscogee where members of a defeated tribe were held in slavery and their descendants were incorporated into the tribe as equal members. European settlers introduced hereditary slavery to the Muscogee Nation and initially Black people were both held in slavery and some escaped slaves were adopted into the tribe.

The Muscogee Nation first codified slavery into its written laws in 1811. During Indian removal, many freedmen were removed from the southeastern United States alongside other Muscogee people. Some Creek citizens married enslaved men or women, and had mixed-race children with them. Interracial marriage was then common, and many Creek Freedmen were partly of Creek Indian ancestry.

During the American Civil War, the Muscogee Nation was divided into pro-Confederacy and pro-Union factions with the pro-Confederates controlling the national government and Opothleyahola leading the pro-Union faction. The confederate-aligned national government passed a law in 1861 to re-enslave any free Black people living within the nation. Because some of the Muscogee (Creek) Nation allied with the during the Civil Was, the United States in required a new treaty with the Creek Nation.

The treaty required the tribes to emancipate their slaves and to offer them citizenship in the Creek and other nations, eligible for voting rights and shares of annuities and land settlements. The treaty called for the setting aside of the western half of the territory (thereafter called Unassigned Lands) for the United States to use for the settlement of Freedmen and other American Indian tribes from the Great Plains. The Creek were forced to cede 3,250,560 acres (13,154.5 km^{2}), for which the United States agreed to pay the sum of thirty cents per acre, amounting to $975,165. Article 4 of the treaty said that the US would conduct a census of the Creek tribe, to include the Freedmen.

In 1893, the United States Dawes Commission under the direction of Henry L. Dawes was established by an act of Congress. The Dawes Act was part of a continuing effort to assimilate American Indians and directed the break-up of communal tribal lands and the allotment of 160-acre plots to individual households. All members of each tribe had to be registered for land allotment. Beginning in 1898, the US officials created the Dawes Rolls to document the tribal members for such allotments; registrars quickly classified persons as "Indians by Blood," "Freedmen," or "Intermarried Whites." However, it included the Creek Freedmen citizens in the Creek nation. The enrollment under the Dawes Commission lasted until April 26, 1906. The final Dawes rolls constitute a record of documented ancestors of Creek Freedmen, but tribal members and historians have complained that the rolls were inaccurate.

The Dawes Rolls have been used as a kind of historic records that form a recognized base for determining tribal membership. Many of the tribes in Oklahoma have increasingly relied on them as sources from which they can require persons applying for membership to document direct descent from historical members of the tribe. Many Freedmen with Indian ancestry were enrolled as having no "Indian blood." Although many Freedmen were of Creek descent, they were included only on Freedmen rolls rather than being noted as having "Indian by Blood."

Most of the Creek Freedmen were farmers in the 19th and the early 20th centuries. The children of Creek Freedmen attended racially-segregated schools.

=== Changes in membership rules ===
The peace treaty of 1866 granted the Freedmen full citizenship and rights as Creek regardless of proportion of Creek or Indian ancestry. The Muscogee (Creek) Nation in 1979 reorganized the government and constitution based on the Oklahoma Indian Welfare Act of 1936. It changed its membership rules, requiring that members be descendants of persons listed as 'Indians by Blood' on the Dawes Rolls. They expelled Creek Freedmen descendants who could not prove descent from such persons, despite the 1866 treaty, asserting their sovereign right to determine citizenship. Since the Creek changed their membership rules in 1979, they have excluded persons who cannot prove descent from persons listed on the Dawes Rolls as Indians by Blood.

In July 2025, the Muscogee Nation Supreme Court struck "by blood" requirements from the nation's constitution and ordered the Muscogee Nation Citizenship Board to begin enrolling Muscogee Freedmen.

== See also ==
- Cherokee Freedmen
- Chickasaw Freedmen
- Choctaw Freedmen
