= Black Seminoles =

Ethnic group

Black Seminole
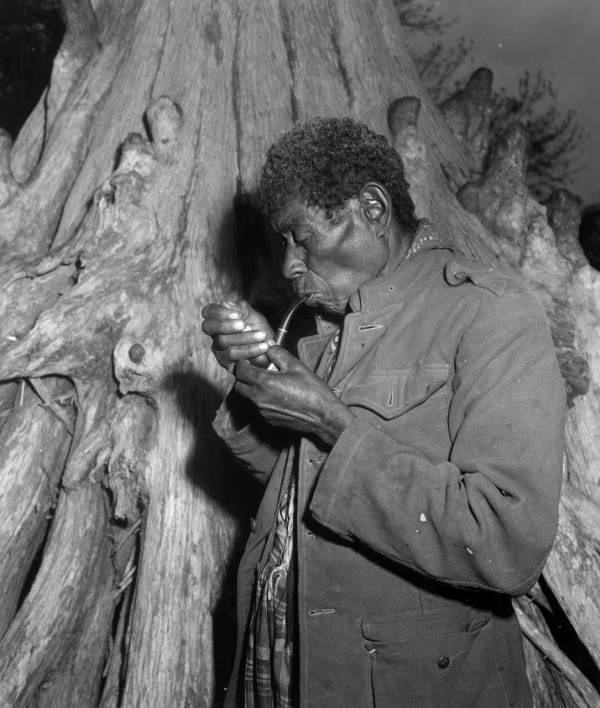
- An Afro-Seminole elder smoking from a pipe (1952)

Total population
- ~2,000

Regions with significant populations
- United States: Oklahoma, Florida, Texas; The Bahamas: Andros Island; Mexico: Coahuila

Languages
- English, Afro-Seminole Creole, Spanish

Religion
- Protestantism, Catholicism and syncretic Islam

Related ethnic groups
- Gullah, Mascogos, Seminoles, Creek Freedmen, Muscogee

The Black Seminoles (Spanish: Semínolas Negros), also known as Afro-Seminoles (Afro-Seminolas), Seminole Freedmen, or Seminole Maroons, are an ethnic group of mixed Seminole and African origin. They are mostly blood descendants of the Seminole people, free Africans, and escaped former slaves, who allied with Seminole groups in Spanish Florida. Many have Seminole lineage, but due to the stigma of having mixed origin, they were categorized as slaves or Freedmen in the past.

Historically, the Black Seminoles lived mostly in distinct bands near the Native American Seminoles. Some were held as slaves, particularly of Seminole leaders, but the Black Seminoles had more freedom than did slaves held by whites in the South and by other Native American tribes. This included the use of firearms. Today, Black Seminole descendants live primarily in rural communities around the Seminole Nation of Oklahoma. Its two Freedmen's bands, the Caesar Bruner Band and the Dosar Barkus Band, are represented on the General Council of the Nation. Other centers are in Florida, Texas, the Bahamas, and northern Mexico. Their culture is a blending of African, Gullah, Seminole, Mexican, Caribbean, and European traditions.

Since the 1930s, the Seminole Freedmen have struggled with exclusion from the Seminole Nation of Oklahoma. In 1990, the tribe received the majority of a $56 million judgment trust by the United States, for seizure of lands in Florida in 1823, and the Freedmen have worked to gain a share of it. In 1999, a suit by the Seminole Freedmen's against the government was dismissed in the United States Court of Appeals for the Tenth Circuit which ruled they could not bring suit independently of the Seminole Nation of Oklahoma, which refused to join. In 2000, the Seminole Nation voted to restrict membership only to those who could prove descent from a Seminole on the early 20th century Dawes Rolls, which led to the exclusion of about 1,200 Freedmen who were previously members. In 2022, the District Court for the District of Columbia ruled that the Freedmen retained membership and voting rights.

== History ==
=== Colonial era ===
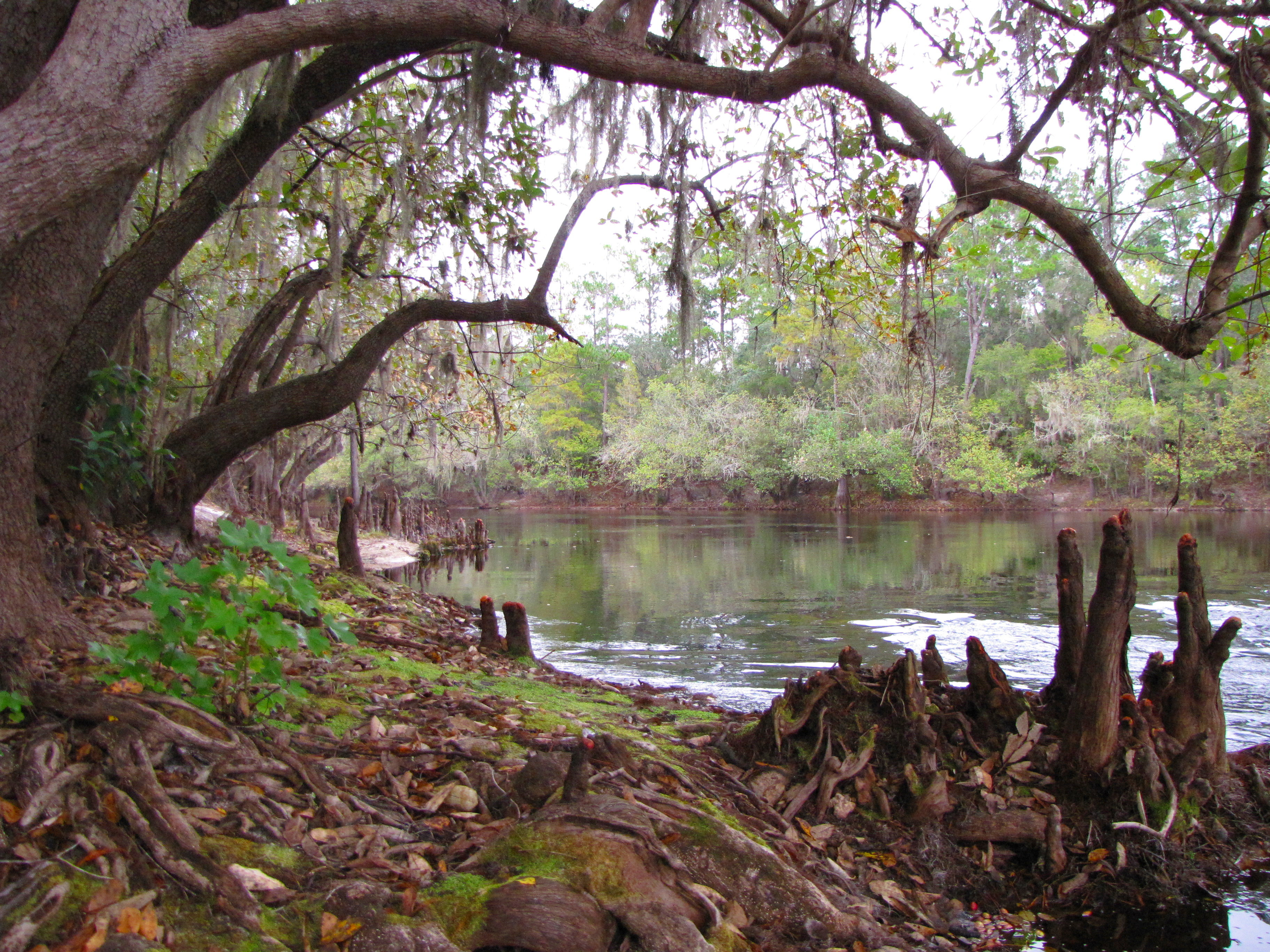
Black Seminole communities were found near the Suwanee River. Larry Eugene Rivers says the name Suwanee may have Bantu etymological origins from the word nsubwanyi meaning "my house, my home".

Spaniards were the first Europeans to colonize Florida and North America in the 16th century. The colony of Spanish Florida included Georgia, the Carolinas, Mississippi, and Alabama. Prior to colonization, Native Americans lived on the land for thousands of years where they hunted, fished, and performed religious ceremonies. Over time, European contact affected Indigenous peoples' way of life. Indigenous peoples in Spanish Florida defended their lands from European settlers and colonists. By the 17th century, Spaniards lacked the resources to protect all of Florida's territory. Spain lost control of the Carolinas in 1633 and the Georgia colony in 1670 to the English (British).

To escape conflict with Europeans, Muscogee people from Alabama and Georgia fled to Florida in search of new lands. Over time, the Creek (Muscogee) were joined by other remnant groups of Southeast American Native Americans, such as the Miccosukee, Choctaw, and the Apalachicola, and formed communities. Other Native American tribes, the Yuchis and Yamasees, merged with the Muscogee and by a process of ethnogenesis, the Native Americans formed the Seminole. Spain had given land to some Muscogee (Creek) Native Americans. Their community evolved over the late 18th and early 19th centuries as waves of Creek left present-day Georgia and Alabama under pressure from white settlement and the Creek Wars. In 1773, when American naturalist William Bartram visited the area, he referred to the Seminole as a distinct people. He believed their name was derived from the word simanó-li, which according to John Reed Swanton, "is applied by the Creeks to people who remove from populous towns and live by themselves."

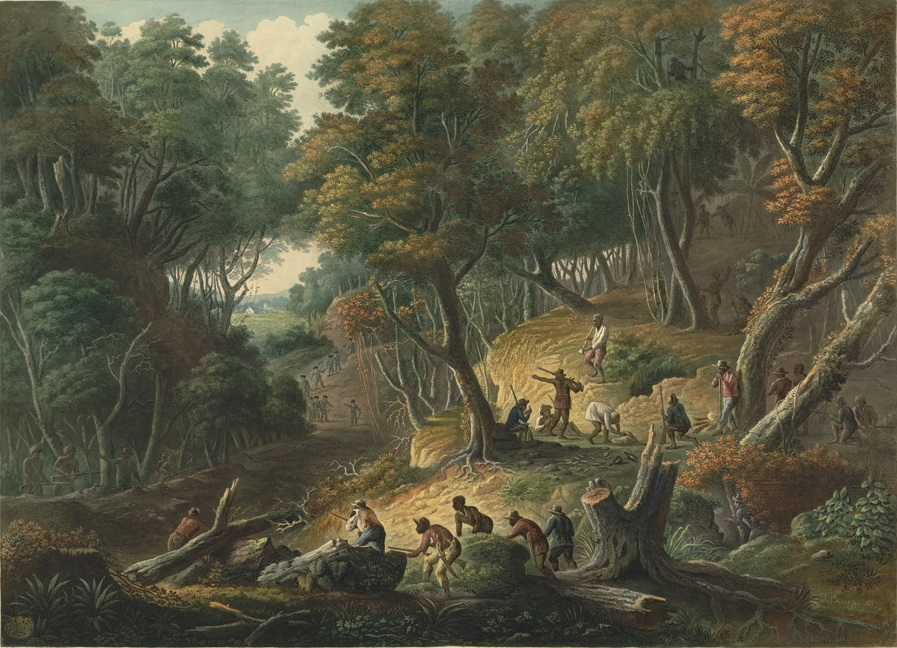
Maroons preparing to ambush

William C. Sturtevant says the ethnonym was borrowed by Muskogee from the Spanish word cimarrón, supposedly the source as well of the English word maroon. This was used to describe the runaway slave communities of Florida and of the Great Dismal Swamp on the border of Virginia and North Carolina, on colonial islands of the Caribbean, and other parts of the New World. But linguist Leo Spitzer, writing in the journal Language, says, "If there is a connection between Eng. maroon, Fr. marron, and Sp. cimarron, Spain (or Spanish America) probably gave the word directly to England (or English America)."

Enslaved and free Africans in the Sea Islands of South Carolina and Georgia gradually formed what has become known as the Gullah culture of the coastal Southeast that was to influence Black Seminole culture. As early as 1686, enslaved people from the Carolinas, Georgia, and the Sea Islands fled British plantations on the Underground Railroad, finding refuge and alliance with Florida's Indigenous populations. These freedom seekers became known as the "Black Seminoles" and "Seminole Maroons". Under a 1693 edict from King Charles II of Spain, freedom seekers received liberty in exchange for defending the Spanish settlers at St. Augustine against the British. The Spanish organized the black volunteers into a militia; their settlement at Fort Mosé, founded in 1738, was the first legally sanctioned free black town in North America. In 1739, Carolinas slaveholders complained to Governor Manuel de Mantiano of Spanish Florida about enslaved laborers escaping to Spanish territory. Mantiano upheld the right to sanctuary, established in Spanish law, for formerly enslaved people seeking freedom.

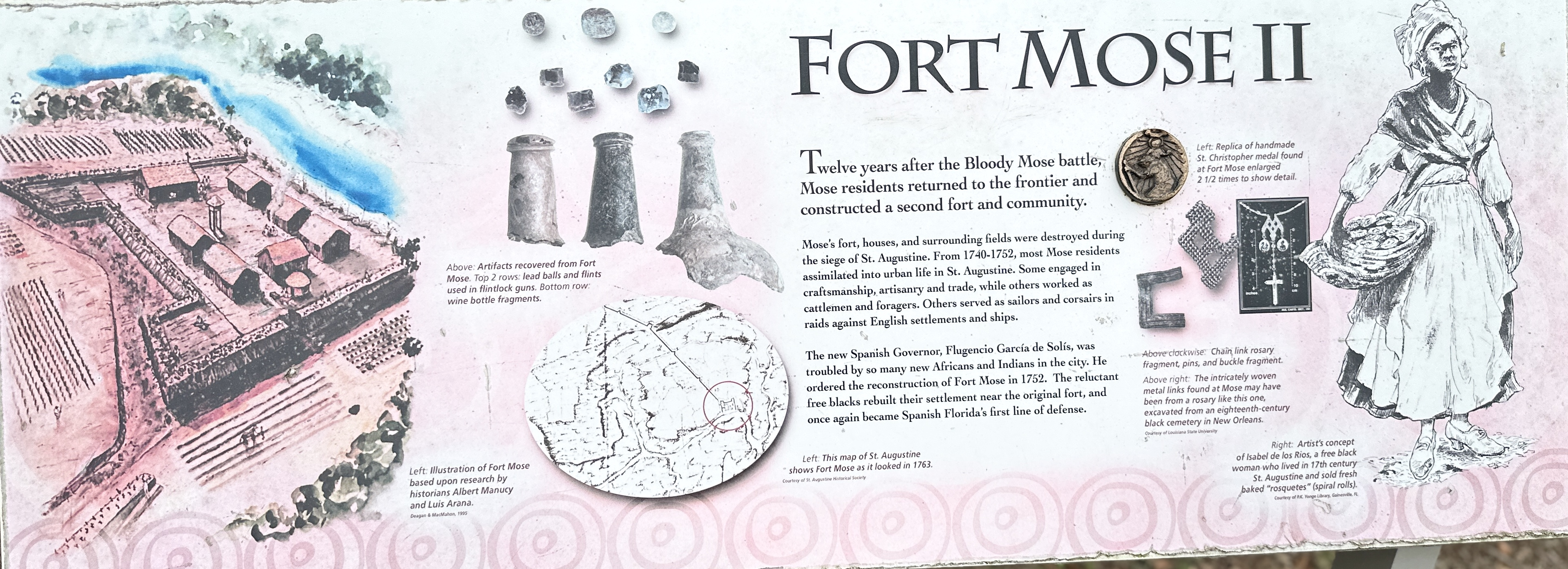
Fort Mose, Fort Mose Historic State Park

In St. Augustine, not all freedom seekers found military service to their liking. More fugitive slaves sought refuge in wilderness areas in northern Florida, where their knowledge of tropical agriculture—and resistance to tropical diseases—served them well. The majority of Africans who fled to Florida were Gullah people who escaped from the rice plantations of South Carolina (and later Georgia). As Gullah, they developed distinct cultural practices and African leadership structure. Black pioneers built their own settlements based on rice and corn agriculture. They became allies of Creek and other Native Americans escaping into Florida from the Southeast at the same time. In Florida, they developed the Afro-Seminole Creole, which they spoke with the growing Seminole tribe.

By 1750, the Muscogee people established an "Indian Country" in Florida and had more semiautonomy than other Native Americans in colonies controlled by the Spanish and the British. Enslaved people continued to seek refuge in Indian country, and British American slaveholders demanded the return of their enslaved laborers from the Muscogee and Seminole Indians. Native Americans allied with black people and together they fought against European colonists and slaveholders. The Maroons lived in proximity to Seminole villages, but lived in independent, separate communities on native land and were culturally and politically autonomous.

=== Antebellum era ===
Florida had been a refuge for enslaved people seeking freedom for at least 70 years by the time of the American Revolution. Communities of Black Seminoles were established on the outskirts of Seminole villages in the 18th and 19th centuries, such as Bowlegs Town on the Suwannee River, an Alachua Seminole village in Paynes Town, Florida, and Okahumpka community of free people and Alachua Seminoles, and others. During the Revolution, the Seminole allied with the British, and African Americans and Seminole came into increased contact with each other. The Seminole held some slaves, as did the Creek and other Southeast Native American tribes. During the War of 1812, members of both communities sided with the British against the US in the hopes of repelling American settlers; they strengthened their internal ties and earned the enmity of American general Andrew Jackson.

==== Seminole Wars ====
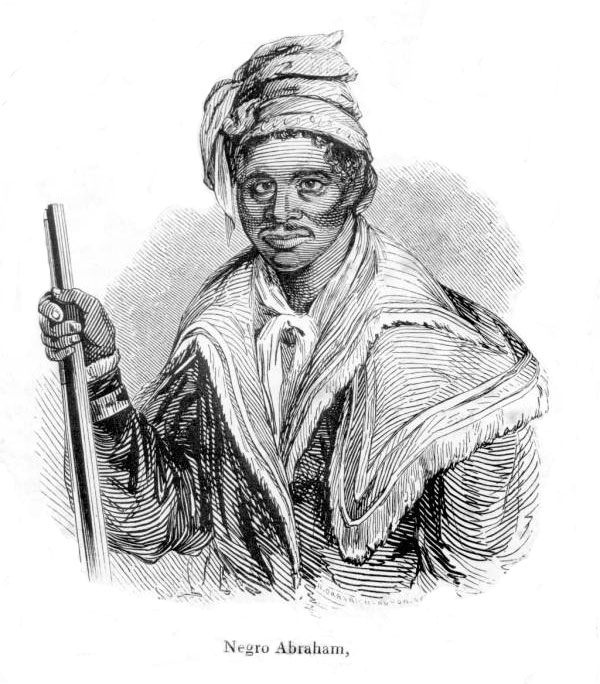
Abraham, a Black Seminole leader, from N. Orr's engraving in The Origin, Progress, and Conclusion of the Florida War (1848) by John T. Sprague.

After winning independence in the Revolution, American slaveholders were increasingly worried about the armed black communities in Florida. The territory was ruled again by Spain, as Britain had ceded both East and West Florida. The US slaveholders sought the capture and return of Florida's black fugitives under the Treaty of New York (1790), the first treaty ratified under the Confederation.

Wanting to disrupt Florida's maroon communities after the War of 1812, General Andrew Jackson attacked the Negro Fort, which had become a Black Seminole stronghold after the British had allowed them to occupy it when they evacuated Florida. Breaking up the maroon communities was one of Jackson's major objectives in the First Seminole War (1817–18). Andrew Jackson directed Edmund P. Gaines to destroy Negro Fort, a haven for escaped slaves and their Seminole allies; however, Gaines delegated the mission to Duncan L. Clinch, whose troops destroyed the fort on July 27, 1816, resulting in 270 deaths. The survivors of Negro Fort settled in other free black and maroon communities in the Florida Peninsula. The US military focused on eliminating the fort because white Americans worried about a growing community of black and native resistance. On April 16, 1818, at the town of Seminole leader Bolek (aka Bowlegs) on the Suwannee River, Andrew Jackson and his troops burned 400 maroon and Seminole homes, destroyed their food supplies, and took several horses and cattle.

Under pressure, the Native American and black communities moved into south and central Florida. The enslaved and Black Seminoles frequently migrated south on the peninsula to escape from Cape Florida to the Bahamas. Hundreds left in the early 1820s after the United States acquired the territory from Spain, effective 1821. Contemporary accounts noted a group of 120 migrating in 1821, and a much larger group of 300 African-American slaves escaping in 1823, picked up by Bahamians in 27 sloops and also by canoes. Their concern about living under American rule was not unwarranted. In 1821, Andrew Jackson became the territorial governor of Florida and ordered an attack on Black Seminoles and other free black settlements near Tampa Bay .

Anticipating attempts to re-enslave more members of their community, Black Seminoles opposed removal to the West. In councils before the war, they threw their support behind the most militant Seminole faction, led by Osceola. After war broke out, individual black leaders, such as John Caesar, Abraham, and John Horse, played key roles. In addition to aiding the natives in their fight, Black Seminoles recruited plantation slaves to rebellion at the start of the war. The slaves joined Native Americans and maroons in the destruction of 21 sugar plantations from Christmas Day, December 25, 1835, through the summer of 1836. Historians do not agree on whether these events should be considered a separate slave rebellion; generally, they view the attacks on the sugar plantations as part of the Seminole War.

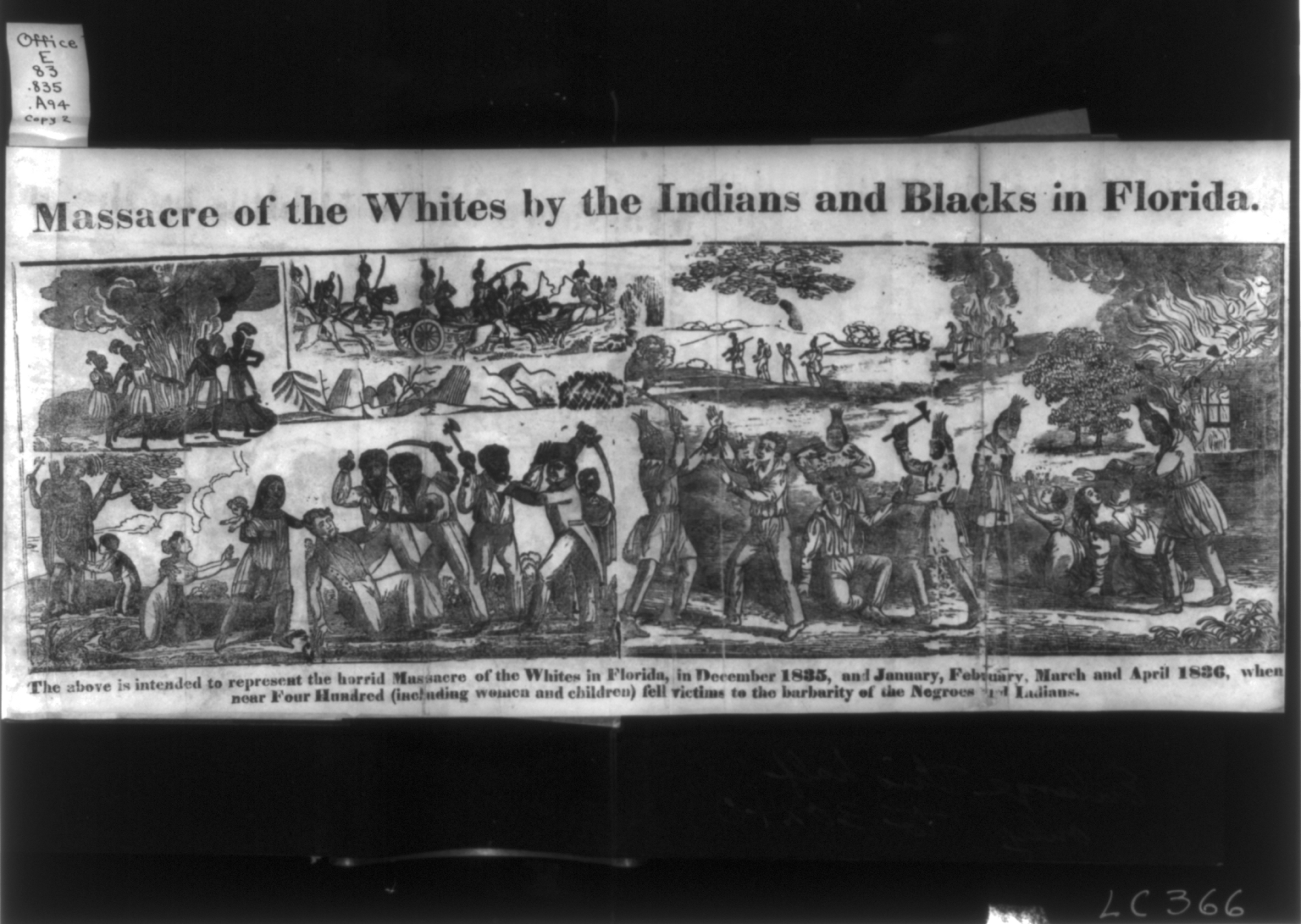
A fold-out depicting fictional massacres from An Authentic Narrative of the Seminole War.

By 1838, U.S. General Thomas Sydney Jesup tried to divide the black and Seminole warriors by offering freedom to African Americans if they surrendered and agreed to removal to Indian Territory. John Horse was among the black warriors who surrendered under this condition. Due to Seminole opposition, however, the Army did not fully follow through on its offer. After 1838, more than 500 Black Seminoles traveled with the Seminoles thousands of miles to the Indian Territory in present-day Oklahoma; some traveled by ship across the Gulf of Mexico and up the Mississippi River. Because of harsh conditions, many of both peoples died along this trail from Florida to Oklahoma, also known as the Trail of Tears.

The status of Black Seminoles and fugitive slaves was largely unsettled after they reached Indian Territory. The issue was compounded by the government's initially putting black people and Seminole under the administration of the Creek Nation, many of whom were slaveholders. The Creek tried to re-enslave some of the fugitive black slaves. John Horse and others set up towns, generally near Seminole settlements, repeating their pattern from Florida.

== In the West and Mexico ==
In the West, the Black Seminoles were still threatened by slave raiders. These included proslavery members of the Creek tribe and some Seminole, whose allegiance to African Americans diminished after defeat by the US in the war. Officers of the federal army may have tried to protect the Black Seminoles, but in 1848, the U.S. attorney general bowed to proslavery lobbyists and ordered the army to disarm the community. This left hundreds of Seminoles and Black Seminoles unable to leave the settlement or to defend themselves against slavers.

=== Migration to Mexico and Texas ===
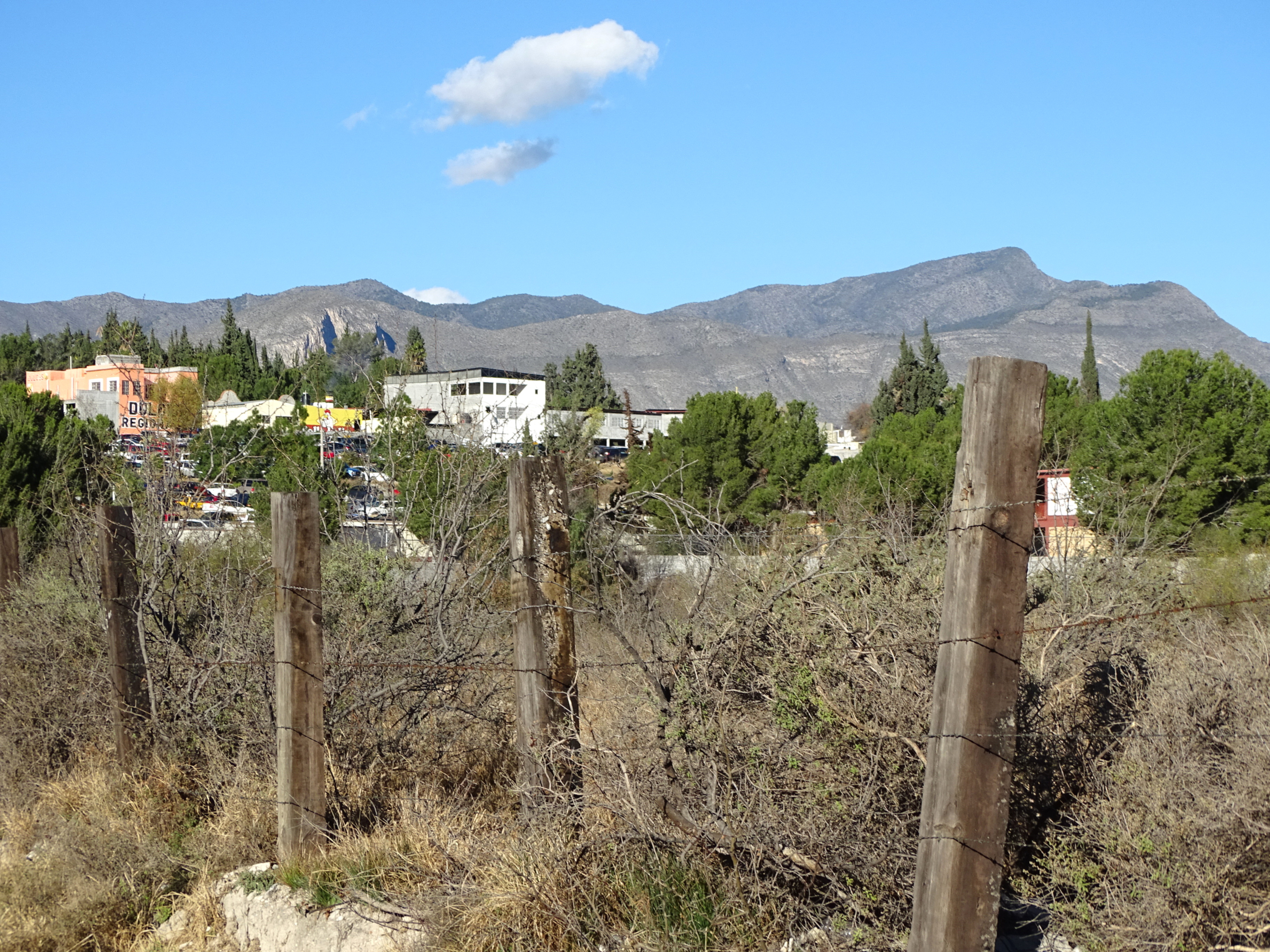
Coahuila, Mexico

Facing the threat of enslavement, Black Seminole leader John Horse and about 180 Black Seminoles staged a mass escape in 1849 to northern Mexico, where slavery had been abolished 20 years earlier. The black fugitives crossed to freedom in July 1850. They rode with a faction of traditionalist Seminole under the chief Coacochee, who led the expedition. The Mexican government welcomed the Seminole allies as border guards on the frontier, and they settled at El Nacimiento, Coahuila.

During his field research among the Black Seminoles, Kenneth Porter was told by Black Seminoles living in Nacimiento and Brackettville about members of the community with Biloxi ancestry. He learned that their Biloxi ancestors included three siblings, Laura Wilson, Isidro Neco, and Maria Iglesias. Porter also learned that some Biloxi had fled to Mexico following a battle near Mill Creek in Texas. He suggested that the family of Laura, Isidro, and Maria may have been among those who fled and subsequently joined the Black Seminole community.

After 1861, the Black Seminoles in Mexico and Texas had little contact with those in Oklahoma. For the next 20 years, Black Seminoles served as militiamen and Native American fighters in Mexico, where they became known as mascogos, derived from the tribal name of the Creek – Muskogee. Slave raiders from Texas continued to threaten the community, but arms and reinforcements from the Mexican Army enabled the black warriors to defend their community. By the 1940s, descendants of the Mascogos numbered 400–500 in El Nacimiento de los Negros, Coahuila, inhabiting lands adjacent to the Kickapoo people. They had a thriving agricultural community. By the 1990s, most of the descendants had moved into Texas.

==== Cultural celebrations ====
Since the 1870s, descendants of Afro-Seminoles called mascogos, continue to celebrate Juneteenth in Coahuila, Mexico. Mascogos call the holiday, Día de los Negros ("Day of the Blacks") or Diecenueve, and prepare food and engage in activities unique to their history and ancestry. Juneteenth brings together a Black Seminole community from Brackettville, Texas, to celebrate the holiday with their mascogos relatives. The activities are trail rides through the landscape, barbecuing food, and singing spirituals. On the eve of Juneteenth, some African Americans retrace the escape routes their ancestors used to flee Texas slavery for Mexico.

=== Texas community ===
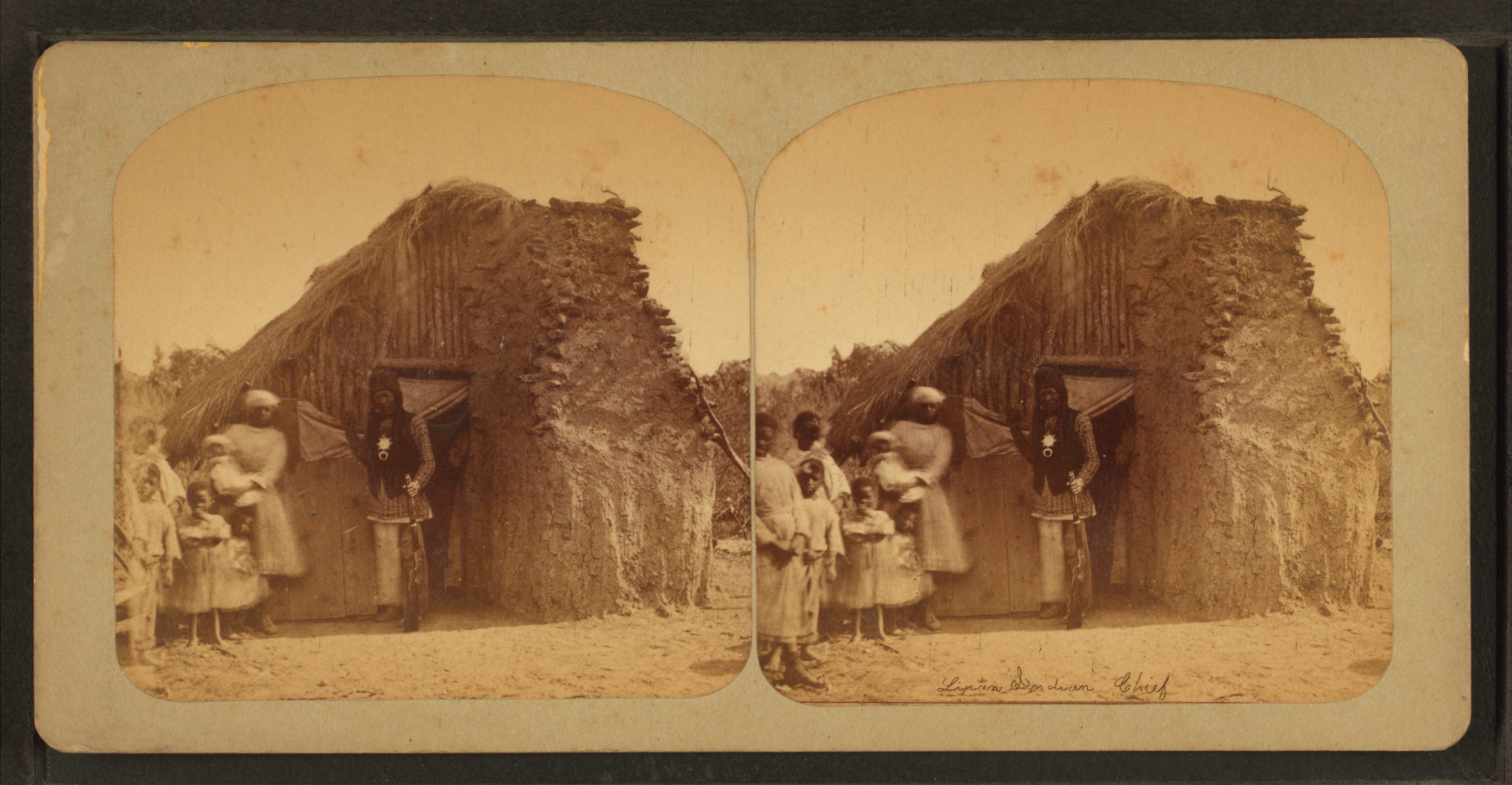
Seminole Chief, Seminole Camp, near Fort Clark, Texas. (c. 1876–1879)

In 1870, the U.S. Army invited Black Seminoles to return from Mexico to serve as army scouts for the United States. The Black Seminole Scouts (originally an African-American unit despite the name) played a lead role in the Texas-Indian Wars of the 1870s, when they were based at Fort Clark, Texas, the home of the Buffalo Soldiers. The scouts became famous for their tracking abilities and feats of endurance. Four men were awarded the Medal of Honor, three for an 1875 action against the Comanche.

After the close of the Texas Indian Wars, the scouts remained stationed at Fort Clark in Brackettville, Texas. The Army disbanded the unit in 1914. The veterans and their families settled in and around Brackettville, where scouts and family members were buried in its cemetery. The town remains the spiritual center of the Texas-based Black Seminoles. In 1981, descendants at Brackettville and the Little River community of Oklahoma met for the first time in more than a century, in Texas for a Juneteenth reunion and celebration.

In 1980, Ian Hancock released a publication titled The Texas Seminoles and Their Language, focusing on the Texas Seminoles. His research emphasizes the distinct linguistic and historical features of this group that is influenced by the Gullah dialect and culture.

==== Seminole Days ====
Seminole Days brings Black Seminole Scouts’ descendants back to Brackettville, Texas, for a heritage and community reunion. The Seminole Indian Scouts Cemetery Association organizes the annual Seminole Days celebration. Descendants of Black Seminole Scouts hike to Seminole Canyon, Texas, taking the same route as their forefathers.

=== Indian Territory/Oklahoma ===
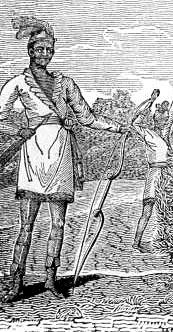
19th-century engraving of a Black Seminole warrior - often believed to be John Horse - of the First Seminole War. (1817–1818)

Throughout the period, several hundred Black Seminoles remained in the Indian Territory (present-day Oklahoma). Because most of the Seminole and the other Five Civilized Tribes supported the Confederacy during the American Civil War, in 1866, the US required new peace treaties with them. The US required the tribes emancipate any slaves and extend to the Freedmen full citizenship rights in the tribes if they chose to stay in Indian Territory. In the late 19th century, Seminole Freedmen thrived in towns near the Seminole communities on the reservation. Most had not been living as slaves to the Native Americans before the war. They lived —as their descendants still do— in and around Wewoka, Oklahoma, the community founded in 1849 by John Horse as a black settlement. Today, it is the capital of the federally recognized Seminole Nation of Oklahoma.

Oklahoma's federal government assigned them to the control of the Creek tribe, which practiced slavery. Seminole maroons were also at risk from capture by white slave traders. In 1850, some Afro-Seminoles, weary of their situation, fled south through proslavery Texas into Mexico, where slavery had been abolished in 1829. Following the Civil War, some Freedmen's leaders in Indian Territory practiced polygyny, as did ethnic African leaders in other diaspora communities. In 1900, 1,000 Freedmen were listed in the population of the Seminole Nation in Indian Territory, about one-third of the total. By the time of the Dawes Rolls, numerous female-headed households were registered. The Freedmen's towns were made up of large, closely connected families.

After allotment, "[f]reedmen, unlike their [Native] peers on the blood roll, were permitted to sell their land without clearing the transaction through the Indian Bureau. That made the poorly educated Freedmen easy marks for white settlers migrating from the Deep South." Numerous Seminole Freedmen lost their land in the early decades after allotment, and some moved to urban areas. Others left the state because of its conditions of racial segregation. As US citizens, they were exposed to the harsher racial laws of Oklahoma.

Since 1954, the Freedmen have been included in the constitution of the Seminole Nation of Oklahoma. They have two bands, each representing more than one town and named for 19th-century band leaders: the Cesar Bruner band covers towns south of Little River; the Dosar Barkus covers the several towns located north of the river. Each of the bands elects two representatives to the General Council of the Seminole Nation.

== Florida and Bahamas ==
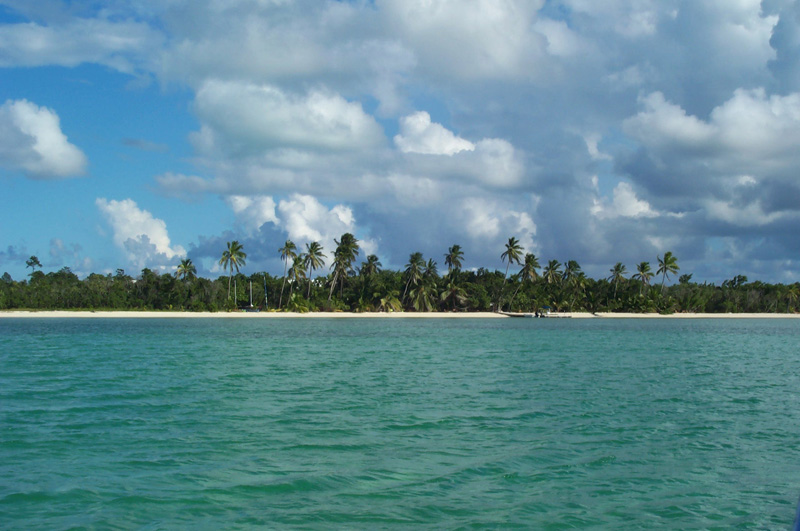
Andros Island

Afro-Seminole descendants continue to live in Florida today. They can enroll in the Seminole Tribe of Florida if they meet its membership criteria for blood quantum: one-quarter Seminole ancestry. About 50 Black Seminoles, all of whom have at least one-quarter Seminole ancestry, live on the Fort Pierce Reservation, a 50-acre parcel taken in trust in 1995 by the Department of Interior for the tribe as its sixth reservation.

Descendants of Afro-Seminoles, who identify as Bahamian, reside on Andros Island in the Bahamas in an area called Red Bay. A few hundred refugees had left in the early 19th century from Cape Florida to go to the British colony for sanctuary from American enslavement. After banning its participation in the Atlantic slave trade in 1807, in 1818, Britain declared that African slaves or slaves who arrived in the Bahamas from outside the British West Indies would be manumitted. In addition, in 1833 Britain abolished slavery throughout its empire.

== Culture ==
Initially living apart from the Native Americans, the maroons developed their own unique African-American culture, based in the Gullah culture of the Lowcountry. The Black Seminole culture that took shape after 1800 was a blending of African, Native American, Spanish, and slave traditions. Afro-Seminoles adopted certain practices of the Native Americans, such as wearing Seminole clothing and moccasins.

=== Food ===
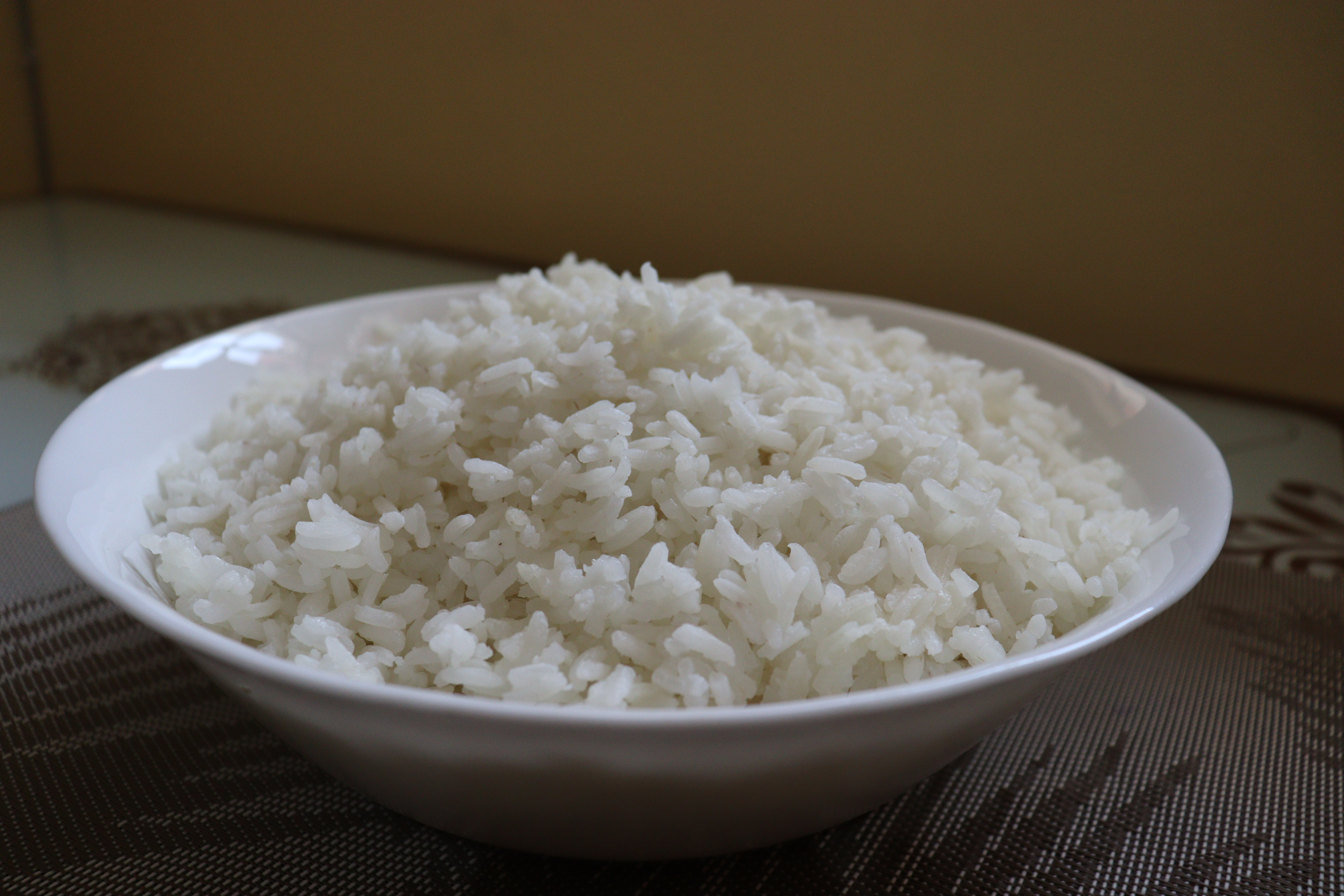
Rice

Black Seminoles ate the same foodstuffs prepared the same way as the Seminoles; they gathered the roots of a native plant called coontie, grinding, soaking, and straining them to make a starchy flour similar to arrowroot, as well as mashing corn with a mortar and pestle to make sofkee, a sort of porridge often used as a beverage, with water added— ashes from the fire wood used to cook the sofkee were occasionally added to it for extra flavor and to nixtamalize the corn. They also introduced their Gullah staple of rice to the Seminole, and continued to use it as a basic part of their diets. Rice remained part of the diet of the Black Seminoles who moved to Oklahoma.

Animal proteins prepared and cooked by Afro-Seminoles in Florida were venison, alligator, freshwater species of fish, including bass, carp, eel, and catfish, and sea turtles. The early Black Seminole people used an African-style, large wooden mortar and pestle for food preparation. They used it for processing corn, grains, seeds, and coontie roots. Mascogos in Nacimiento Coahuila, Mexico used a Mexican grindstone and a large African mortar and pestle to crush and grind food. In the language of the mascogos, the word for mortar and pestle is maata en maatastick and metate y tejolote is the Spanish word for a grinding stone. Mortars and pestles were used to crush dried corn kernels and other food items; the grinding stone was used to mash peppers. Herbalism was practiced by the women. They gathered roots and herbs from nature and made teas with mint, rosemary, oregano, and other medicines.

Historian Ray Von Robertson interviewed 16 Black Seminoles from 2006 and 2007 and documented how Seminole cultural influences were incorporated into their daily lives in practices such as food ways, herbal medicine, and language. Black Seminoles cooked and ate frybread, sofkee, and grape dumplings. Mascogos in Mexico celebrate Juneteenth with food traditions that come from American, African American, Mexican, and Native American cuisines. Juneteenth celebrations include: "...frijole rancheros, empanadas de la calabacita, and even potato salad. One dish that exists both in Mexico and stateside is sofkee. Derived from the Creek word safke or osafke, sofkee is a white corn-based soup cooked with ash originating from the Southeast United States, the recipe traveling with the Indigenous peoples. Sweet and a tiny bit grainy..."

=== Afro-Seminole Creole language ===
WIKITONGUES- Bertha speaking Afro-Seminole Creole

The language of the Black Seminoles is a mix of African, Seminole, and European words influenced by the Gullah dialect. Their language is called by scholars an Afro-Seminole Creole. The African heritage of the Black Seminoles, according to academics, is from the Kongo, Yoruba, and other African ethnic groups. African-American linguist and historian Lorenzo Dow Turner documented about 15 words spoken by Gullah and Black Seminoles that came from the Kikongo language. Other African words spoken are from the Twi, Wolof, and other West African languages. Afro-Seminole Creole was identified as a distinct language in 1978 by linguist Ian Hancock. Black Seminoles and Freedmen continued to speak Afro-Seminole Creole through the 19th century in Oklahoma. Hancock found that in 1978, some Black Seminole and Seminole elders spoke it in Oklahoma and Florida.

Creole languages in Africa and the Caribbean also share a relation with Afro-Seminole Creole, which is an English-lexifier Creole. The language of the Black Seminoles traces back to the coast of Africa from West African Pidgin English, eventually making its way to Georgia and South Carolina's Sea Islands when the transatlantic slave trade took many rice-cultivating Africans from Sierra Leone and other West-Central African regions. Seminole and Spanish words entered the language when enslaved people escaped to Spanish Florida from the British colonies. The Bantu words are oolah (bedbug), pingy (cooking pot), cootie (stunted pig), teemuh (dig a hole) and zoondoo (hammer). Influences from Gold Coast languages include Cuffy (male given name), Cudjo (male given name) and kunkie (a tamal). Words from the Upper Guinea Region are boontuh (buttocks), chikka-bode (teeter totter), tabby (mud daub), chooklah (girlfriend) and ninny (breasts).

Afro-Seminole creole has English and Scottish English dialects from the 18th century. In southwestern English dialects, the words are weekaday (weekday), mole (fontanelle), yeddy (hear), leff (leave), broke (break), loss (lose), ees (yeast) and ood (wood). From Scottish English dialects the words are pit (put), snoot (snout), wurrum (worm), graytuh (grate) and bresh (brush). The Spanish influences are banyuh (wash), kwahah (make cheese), matatty (grindstone), soakettuh (mud), beeoleen (violin), calpintero (woodpecker), treego (rice) and huckle (adobe hut). The Native American words are suffki (corn porridge), stammal (ground corn), poleyjo (hominy) and polijotee (a corn-based drink).

==== Native American languages ====
Some Black Seminoles spoke Muscogee and Miccosukee languages.

=== Family and societal life ===
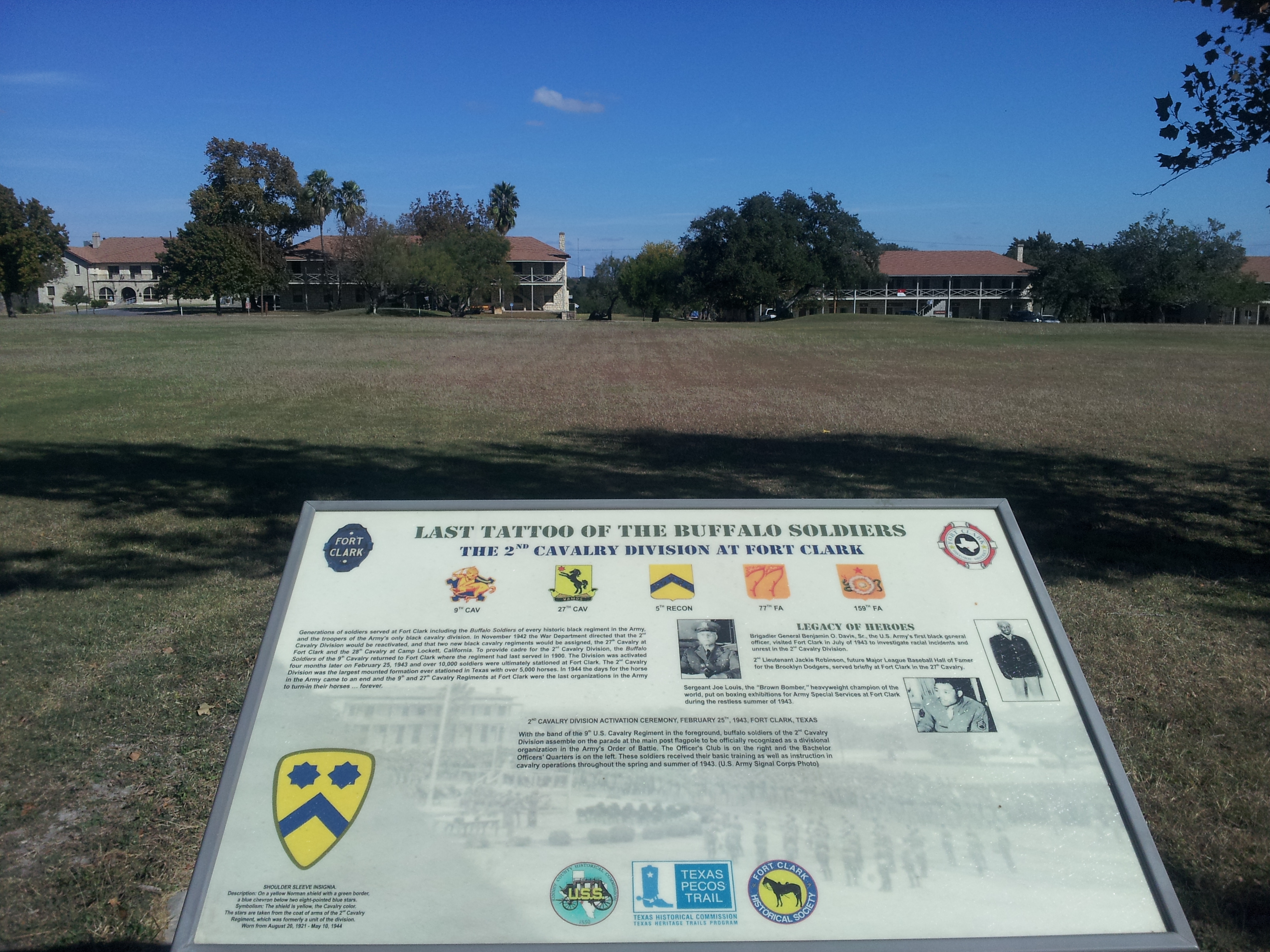
Black Seminole Scouts and Buffalo Soldiers were stationed at Fort Clark in Texas.

Black Seminoles and Seminoles intermarried. The Black Seminoles allied with the Seminole at times of war. The Seminole society was based on a matrilineal kinship system, in which inheritance and descent went through the maternal line coming from Seminole mothers. Children were considered to belong to the mother's clan, so ethnic mixed offspring from Black mothers and Seminole men would have been considered born outside of the clan. While the children might integrate customs from both parents' cultures, the Seminole believed they belonged to the mother's group more than the father's. Maroon families gave African-derived names to their children based on the day or week their baby was born, such as "Cudjoe" for Monday and "Cuffy" for Friday. They built their homes in the Seminole architectural style of thatched palmetto plank houses.

African Americans adopted some elements of the European-American patriarchal system, but under the South's adoption of the principle of partus sequitur ventrem in the 17th century and incorporated into slavery law in slave states, children of slave mothers were considered legally slaves. Under the Fugitive Slave Law of 1850, even if the mother escaped to a free state, her children and she were legally considered slaves and fugitives. As a result, the Black Seminoles born to slave mothers were always at risk from slave raiders. Certain cultural practices, such as "jumping the broom" to celebrate marriage, hailed from the plantations; other customs, such as some names used for black towns, reflected African heritage.

Black Seminoles also commemorate Juneteenth, but have a different perspective. Some believe they do not descend from slaves because their ancestors escaped from slavery and fought for their independence by allying with the Seminoles. Miss Charles Wilson, Black Seminole elder, says this about Juneteenth: "We were never slaves," "but we show our sympathy for the people who were slaves on Juneteenth."

Afro-Seminoles have a reunion and celebration unique to their ancestry and history. On Martin Luther King Jr. weekend, descendants of Black Seminoles return to Florida for a Seminole Maroon reunion. On the land where their ancestors lived and died, they hold a spiritual ceremony with prayers to honor them. A traditional Junkanoo Street parade with music showcased a history of cultural exchange between the Seminoles and black communities.

Author and commentator Scott Thybony traveled to Texas in 2020 and interviewed several Black Seminoles. Thybony documented Gullah and Seminole language and dance traditions in a Texas community. Afro-Seminoles celebrate their ancestors' freedom escape from slavery and armed resistance movements against their enslavers. One descendant, Willie Warrior, said how their ancestors adopted Seminole way of living and clothing. They acknowledge they were free decades before Emancipation. Thybony documented a conversation he had with Lily Mae Dimery. In the Gullah dialect, Dimery told of a traditional dance during a New Year's Eve party. She said: the

They began dancing the old step, their knees bending in time to the chant, but soon she was laughing so hard she couldn’t continue. She remembered hearing people chant in Seminole when she was a young girl. “It was an Indian chant,” she said. “De-hey, de-hey – like that.”

=== Religion and spirituality ===
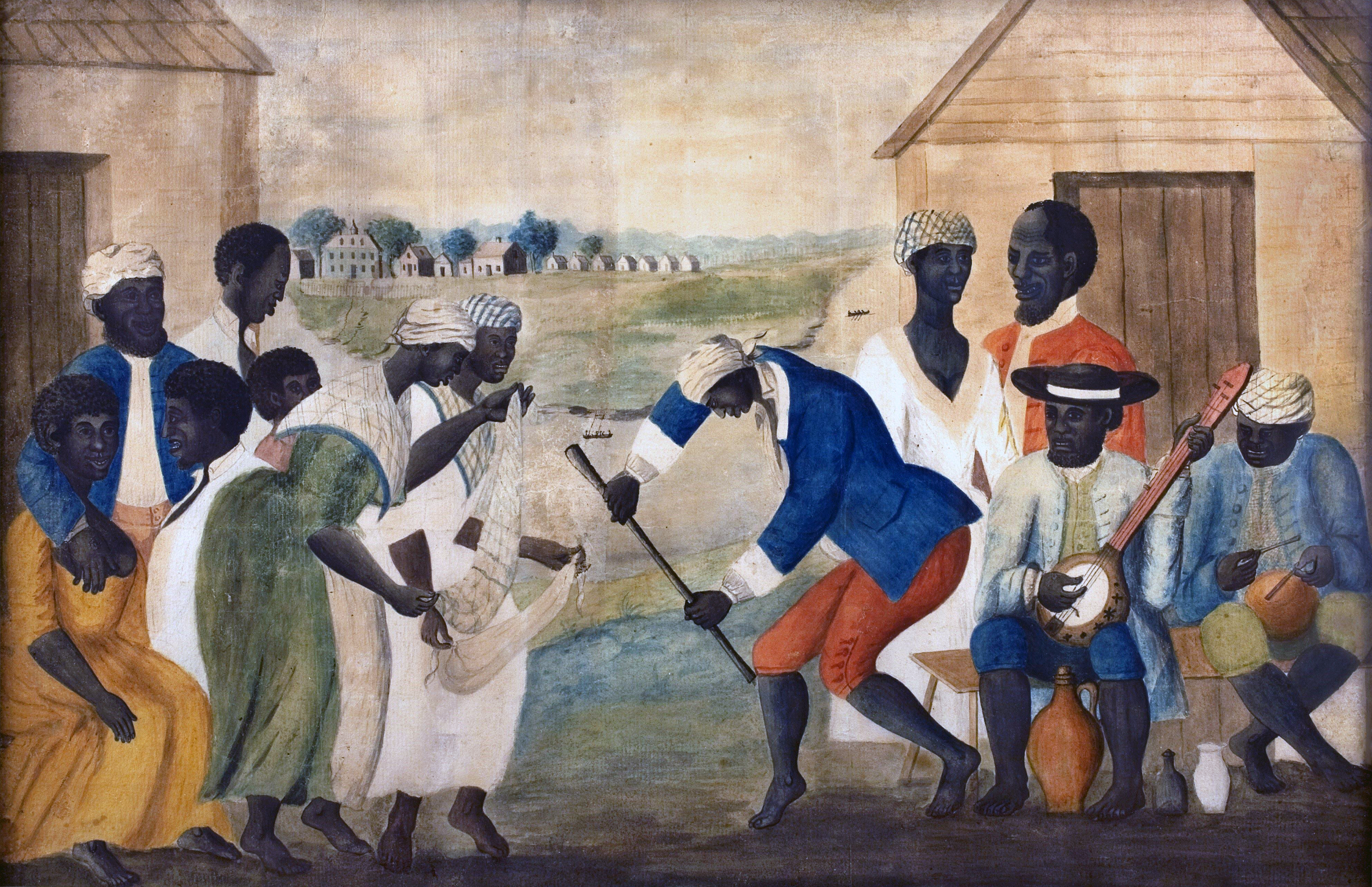
Gullah Geechee culture influenced the music and dance of the Black Seminoles.

Shirley Boteler Mock, a research fellow and author at the University of Texas, studied Black Seminole communities in Mexico and Texas, and interviewed African-American women. Women are the cultural bearers and provide spiritual guidance. Their ancestors passed down their cultural and spiritual traditions through family oral stories. Black Seminole women connect spiritually with their ancestors through fasting, dreaming, and secluded time in bushes, mountains, and other areas. Women prayed and read dreams to foretell future events and heal the sick. Spiritual mothers of the church interpreted dreams and guided people on how to pray to receive a dream from a spirit. These traditions have their roots in Gullah and Seminole Indian cultures.

Black Seminoles inclined toward a syncretic form of Christianity developed during the plantation years. Spirituals, singing, clapping, and the African-American ring shout is performed in the churches. The ring shout is counter-clockwise circle dancing that involves singing, clapping, and shuffling of the feet culminating in the possession by the Holy Spirit.

=== Folktales ===
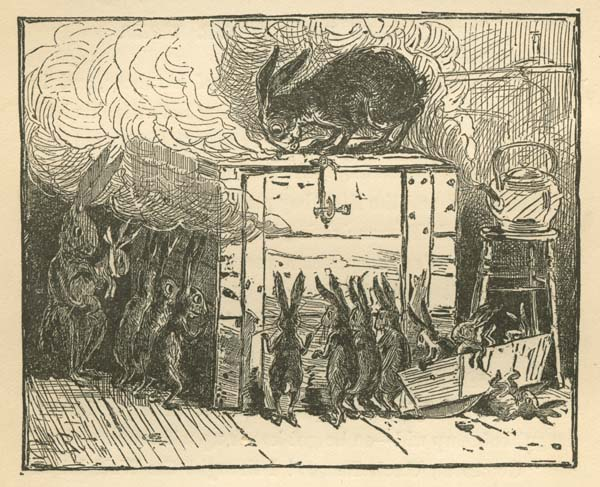
Brer Rabbit and family, 1881

African-American folklore depicts Uncle Monday as an enslaved African conjurer, medicine man, and shapeshifter in the Southern United States. According to the folk story, he escaped slavery on the Underground Railroad traveling from South Carolina and Georgia to find refuge with the Seminole and Black Seminole tribes in Florida. He used his conjure powers to shapeshift into an alligator and led a resistance movement against slavery. Those not spiritually gifted like Uncle Monday that were not able to defend themselves from American invasion resettled in Oklahoma's Indian Territory. This folktale is based on historical accounts of the alliance between the Seminole people and Black Seminoles and their resistance movement against enslavement and colonialism.

Black Seminole leader John Horse is interpreted as a mythic hero and is fused with High John the Conqueror, an African-American folk hero, and a cunning trickster hero Br'er Rabbit. These three heroes were resistance leaders against oppression and inequality and used their wits, charms, and intelligence to outsmart their enemies.

== African-Seminole relations ==
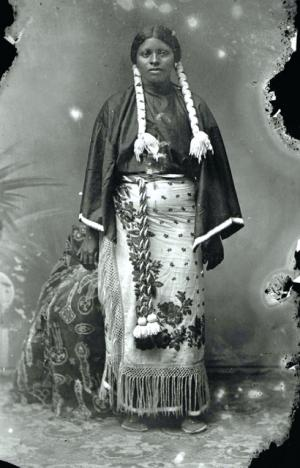
Diana Fletcher (b. 1838), a Black Seminole who was adopted into the Kiowa tribe

By the early 19th century, Maroons (free Black people and freedom seekers) and the Seminole were in regular contact in Florida, where they evolved a system of relations unique among North American Native Americans and Black people. Seminole practice in Florida had acknowledged slavery, though not on the chattel slavery model then common in the American south. Instead, scholars have described aspects of the system as resembling tributary or patron-client relationships found in broader Southeastern Indigenous societies. Historian David Colburn estimates that by 1836 at least twelve hundred Black Maroon settlements lived in Seminole towns.

General Edmund Pendleton Gaines, who visited several flourishing Black Seminole settlements in the 1800s, described the African Americans as "vassals and allies" of the Seminole. Nero, Garçon, Cyrus, and Prince were Afro Seminole warriors and chiefs who sat in counsel with the Seminoles. The Maroons and Seminole led military operations together against the Georgia militia and US forces during the Patriot War and commanded 300 Black soldiers at the Battle of Suwannee in 1818. Atlantic Creoles (Maroons) and Seminoles fought against U.S. imperialism and southern racial slavery. Black Maroons offered military backing to the Red Sticks during their armed conflict at Prospect Bluff fort. Black Seminoles advanced to leadership roles. Abraham, whose Seminole name was Souanaffe Tustenukke, was the “hoponaya,” translating English for the Seminole council.

Black prisoners or freedom seekers found sanctuary among the Seminole, and in exchange paid an annual tribute of livestock, crops, hunting, and war party obligations. Seminoles, in turn, acquired an important strategic ally in a sparsely populated region. They elected their own leaders, and could amass wealth in cattle and crops. Most importantly, they bore arms for self-defense. Florida real estate records show that the Seminole and Black Seminole people owned large quantities of Florida land. In some cases, a portion of that Florida land is still owned by the Seminole and Black Seminole descendants in Florida. In the 19th century, the Black Seminoles were called "Seminole Negroes" by their white American enemies and Estelusti ("Black People"), by their Native American allies.

Under the comparatively free conditions, the Black Seminoles flourished. US Army Lieutenant George McCall recorded his impressions of a Black Seminole community in 1826:

We found these negroes in possession of large fields of the finest land, producing large crops of corn, beans, melons, pumpkins, and other esculent vegetables.... I saw, while riding along the borders of the ponds, fine rice growing; and in the village large corn-cribs were filled, while the houses were larger and more comfortable than those of the Native Americans themselves.

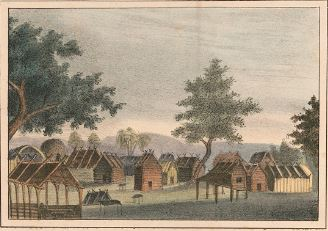
"An Indigenous town, residence of a chief", from Lithographs of Events in the Seminole War in Florida in 1835, published by Gray and James in 1837

The traditional relationship between Black Seminoles and Natives changed in the course of the Second Seminole War when the old tribal system broke down and the Seminole resolved themselves into loose war bands living off the land with no distinction between tribal members and Black fugitives. That changed again in the new territory when the Seminole were obliged to settle on fixed lots of land and take up settled agriculture. Conflict arose in the territory because the transplanted Seminole had been placed on land allocated to the Creek, who had a practice of chattel slavery. There was increasing pressure from both Creek and pro-Creek Seminole for the adoption of the Creek model of slavery for the Black Seminoles. Creek slavers and those from other Native groups, and whites, began raiding the Black Seminole settlements to kidnap and enslave people. The Seminole leadership would become headed by a pro-Creek faction who supported the institution of chattel slavery. These threats led to many Black Seminoles escaping to Mexico.

According to Rachel Sarah O’Toole, an associate professor of history:

Throughout the eighteenth and early-nineteenth centuries, the Seminole people also profited from the enslavement of Black people who they defined as Estelusti. For the Seminole, enslaved people were categorized as a lower subservient group and, as captives, lacked necessary kin ties to be considered as political, social, and cultural equals. Enslaved people were acquired with violence and sold among owners. Still, enslaved Atlantic Creoles could be more mobile and independent among the Seminole. For example, rather than having to work for their Indigenous enslavers Black families lived together in separate villages near Indian settlements and paid an annual tribute to the Seminole people in the form of provisions as well as ritual gifts.

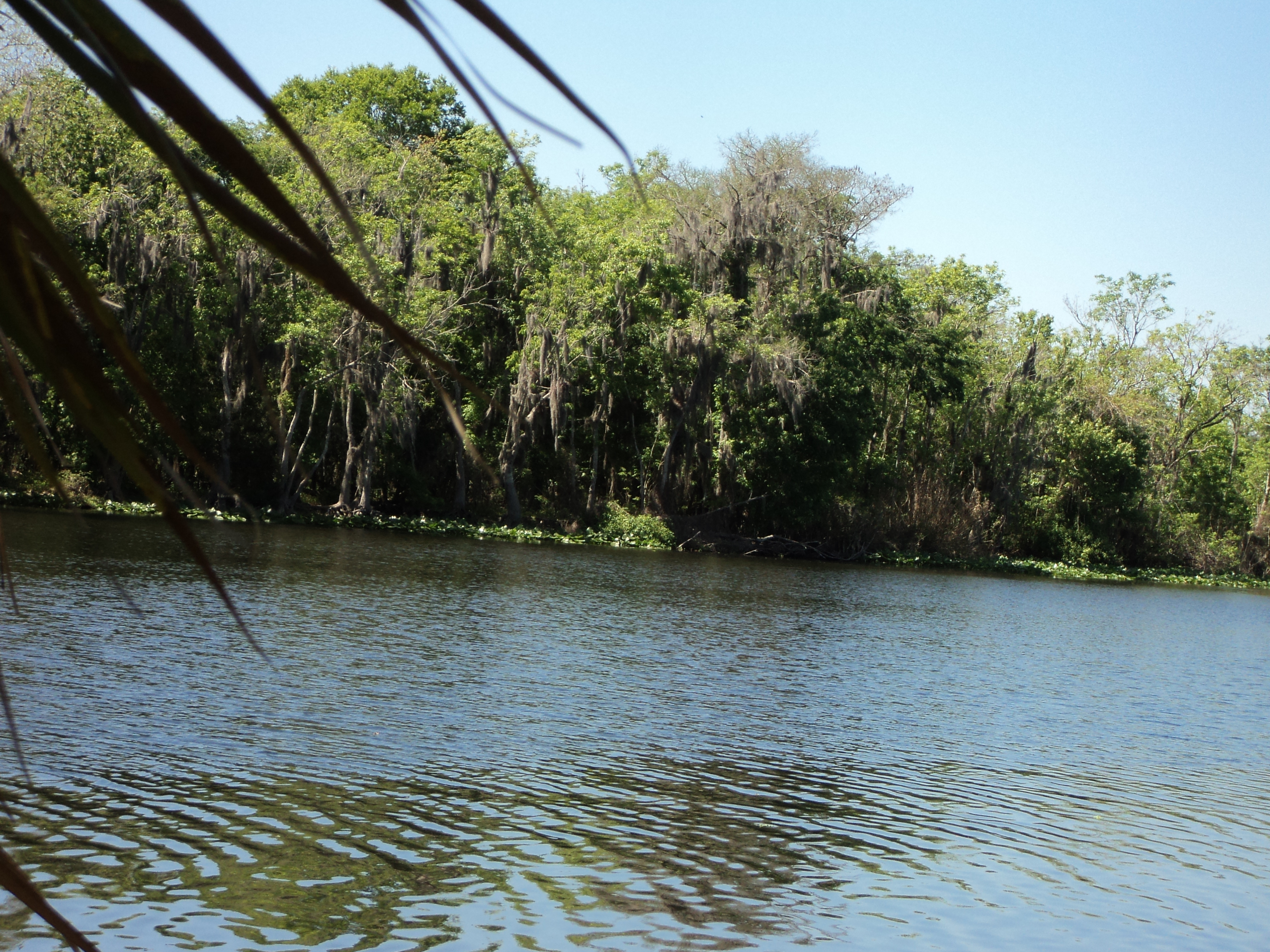
Black Seminole communities lived near the St. Johns River in Florida.

In terms of spirituality, the ethnic groups remained distinct. Seminole historian Susan Miller says that Black Seminoles did not participate in Seminole ceremonies such as the Seminole Busk ritual. Participation in spiritual practices required matrilineal descent within a Seminole clan. Black enslaved people had a syncretic form of Christianity brought with them from the plantations and developed a Pan-African culture that was expressed in writing, language, religion, and social structure. In general, the Black former-slaves never wholly adopted Seminole culture and beliefs but were accepted into Seminole society, as seen by the skin tone in the pictures of the early 1900s. They were not considered Native American by the middle of the 20th century.

Most Black former-slaves spoke Gullah, an Afro-English-based creole language. That enabled them to communicate better with Anglo-Americans than the Creek or Mikasuki-speaking Seminole. The Native Americans used them as translators to advance their trading with the British and other tribes. Black Seminoles and their Native allies shared resources. For example, Black Seminoles grew corn, sweat potatoes, and other crops that they shared with the Seminoles, and in return the Seminoles protected the Maroons from white plantation owners.

== Seminole Freedmen exclusion ==
In 1900, Seminole Freedmen numbered about 1,000 on the Oklahoma reservation, about one-third of the total population at the time. Members were registered on the Dawes Rolls for allocation of communal land to individual households. Since then, numerous Freedmen left after losing their land, as their land sales were not overseen by the Indian Bureau. Others left because of having to deal with the harshly segregated society of Oklahoma.

The land allotments and participation in Oklahoma society altered relations between the Seminole and Freedmen, particularly after the 1930s. Both peoples faced racial discrimination from whites in Oklahoma, who essentially divided society into two: white and "other". Public schools and facilities were racially segregated.

When the tribe reorganized under the Indian Reorganization Act of 1934, some Seminole wanted to exclude the Freedmen and keep the tribe as Native American only. It was not until the 1950s that the Black Seminole were officially recognized in the constitution. Another was adopted in 1969, that restructured the government according to more traditional Seminole lines. It established 14 town bands, of which two represented Freedmen. The two Freedmen's bands were given two seats each, like other bands, on the Seminole General Council.

There have been "battles over tribal membership across the country, as gambling revenues and federal land payments have given Native Americans something to fight over." In 2000, Seminole Freedmen were in the national news because of a legal dispute with the Seminole Nation of Oklahoma, of which they had been legal members since 1866, over membership and rights within the tribe.

The Seminole Nation of Oklahoma held the Black Seminoles could not share in services to be provided by a $56 million federal settlement, a judgement trust, originally awarded in 1976 to the Seminole Nation of Oklahoma and the Seminole Tribe of Florida (and other Florida Seminoles) by the federal government. The settlement was in compensation for land taken from them in northern Florida by the United States at the time of the signing of the Treaty of Moultrie Creek in 1823, when most of the Seminole and maroons were moved to a reservation in the center of the territory. This was before removal west of the Mississippi.

The judgement trust was based on the Seminole tribe as it existed in 1823. Black Seminoles were not recognized legally as part of the tribe, nor was their ownership or occupancy of land separately recognized. The US government at the time would have assumed most were fugitive slaves, without legal standing. The Oklahoma and Florida groups were awarded portions of the judgement related to their respective populations in the early 20th century, when records were made of the mostly full-blood descendants of the time. The settlement apportionment was disputed in court cases between the Oklahoma and Florida tribes, but finally awarded in 1990, with three-quarters going to the Oklahoma people and one-quarter to those in Florida.

However, the Black Seminole descendants asserted their ancestors had also held and farmed land in Florida and suffered property losses as a result of US actions. They filed suit in 1996 against the Department of Interior to share in the benefits of the judgement trust of the Seminole Nation of Oklahoma, of which they were members. In 1999, the Seminole Freedmen's suit against the government was dismissed in the United States Court of Appeals for the Tenth Circuit; the court ruled the Freedmen could not bring suit independently of the Seminole Nation of Oklahoma, which refused to join. As a sovereign nation, they could not be ordered to join the suit.

=== 21st century ===
In another aspect of the dispute over citizenship, in the summer of 2000 the Seminole Nation of Oklahoma voted to restrict members, according to blood quantum, to those who had one-eighth Seminole ancestry, basically those who could document descent from a Seminole ancestor listed on the Dawes Rolls, the federal registry established in the early 20th century. At the time, during rushed conditions, registrars had separate lists for Seminole-Indian and Freedmen. They classified those with visible African ancestry as Freedmen, regardless of their proportion of Native American ancestry or whether they were considered Native members of the tribe at the time. This excluded some Black Seminole from being listed on the Seminole-Indian list who qualified by ancestry.

The Dawes Rolls included in the Seminole-Indian list many Intermarried Whites who lived on Native American lands, but did not include Black people of the same status. The Seminole Freedmen believed the tribe's 21st-century decision to exclude them was racially based and has opposed it on those grounds. The Department of Interior said that it would not recognize a Seminole government that did not have Seminole Freedmen participating as voters and on the council, as they had officially been members of the nation since 1866. In October 2000, the Seminole Nation filed its own suit against the Interior Department, contending it had the sovereign right to determine tribal membership.

The District Court for the District of Columbia ruled in September 2002 in Seminole Nation of Oklahoma v. Norton that Freedmen retained membership and voting rights. The tribe however maintained a separate status for Freedmen and does not consider them full members, or members "by blood". In Oklahoma during 2006 and 2007, historian Ray Von Robertson conducted oral interviews with sixteen Black Seminoles who had obtained Seminole Freedman identification cards and found that Black Seminoles were disenfranchised, did not receive full acceptance in the Seminole Nation, and did not receive full benefits from the funds programs offered to the Seminole nation coming from the Bureau of Indian Affairs.

In 2004, the Bureau of Indian Affairs held that the exclusion of Black Seminoles constituted a violation of the Seminole Nation's 1866 treaty with the United States following the American Civil War. They noted that the treaty was made with a tribe that included Black as well as white and brown members. The treaty had required the Seminole to emancipate their slaves, and to give the Seminole Freedmen full citizenship and voting rights. The BIA stopped federal funding for a time for services and programs to the Seminole.

The individual Certificate of Degree of Indian Blood (CDIB) is based on registration of ancestors in the Indian lists of the Dawes Rolls. Although the BIA could not issue CDIBs to the Seminole Freedmen, in 2003 the agency recognized them as members of the tribe and advised them of continuing benefits for which they were eligible. Journalists theorized the decision could affect the similar case in which the Cherokee Nation of Oklahoma excluded Cherokee Freedmen as members unless they could document a direct Native American ancestor on the Dawes Rolls.

In October 2021, the federal Indian Health Service announced that Seminole Nation Freedmen are eligible for health care, after months of reports noting that the tribe was denying Freedmen COVID-19 vaccines; in at least one case, a Black Seminole was denied access to the tribe's COVID-19 emergency assistance program.

Afro-Natives and Black Seminoles from across the United States convened on January 11, 2023, at Florida's historic Seminole Inn in Indiantown with several Native American tribes to address their complex history, hoping to seek federal recognition. For the first time, many Black Seminole descendants returned to Florida, a state where their ancestors had lived freely since the 17th century, escaping slavery in Georgia and the Carolinas.

== Legacy and honors ==
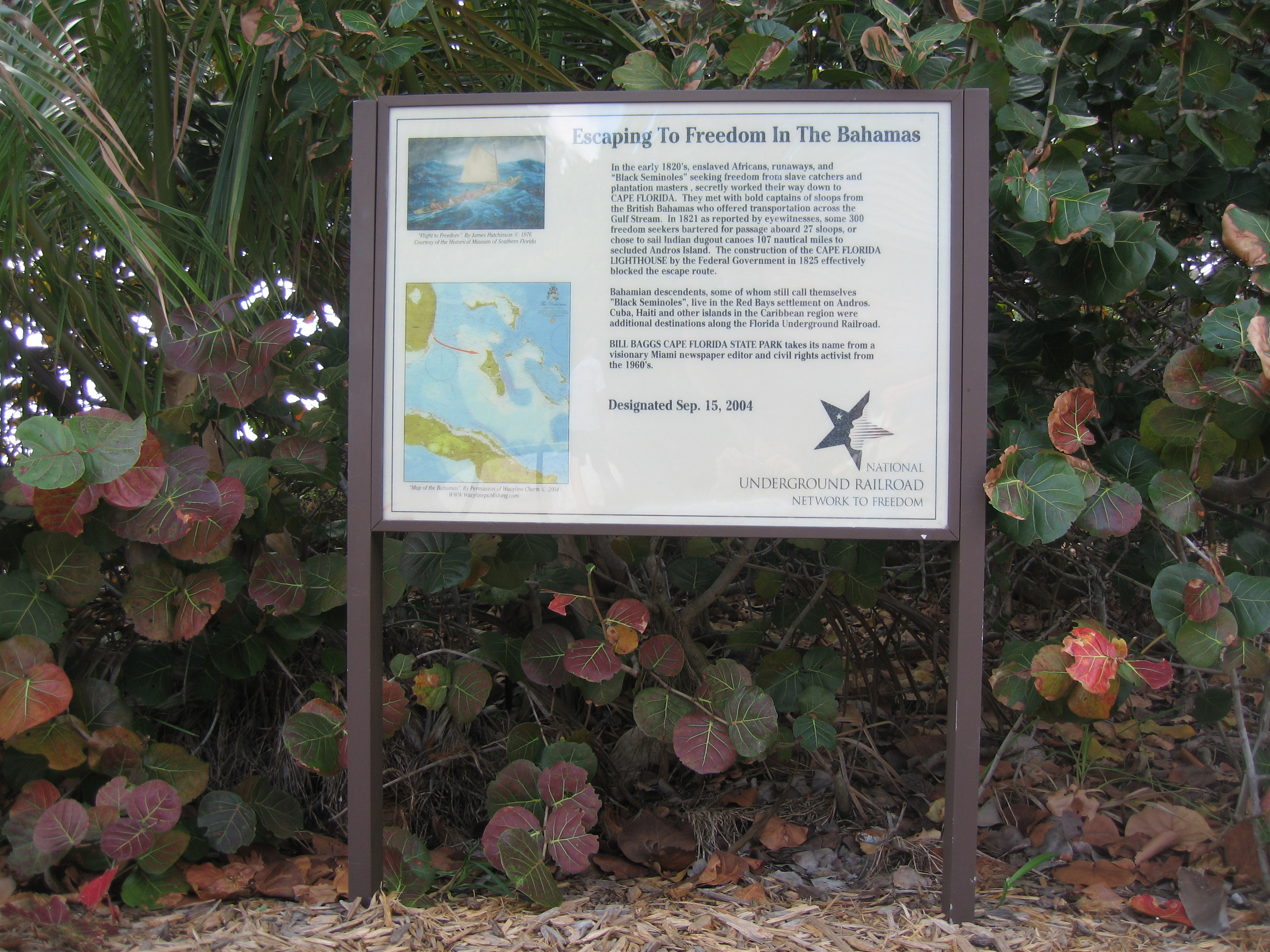
Network to Freedom Trail sign commemorating hundreds of Black Seminoles who escaped from Cape Florida in the early 1820s to the Bahamas.

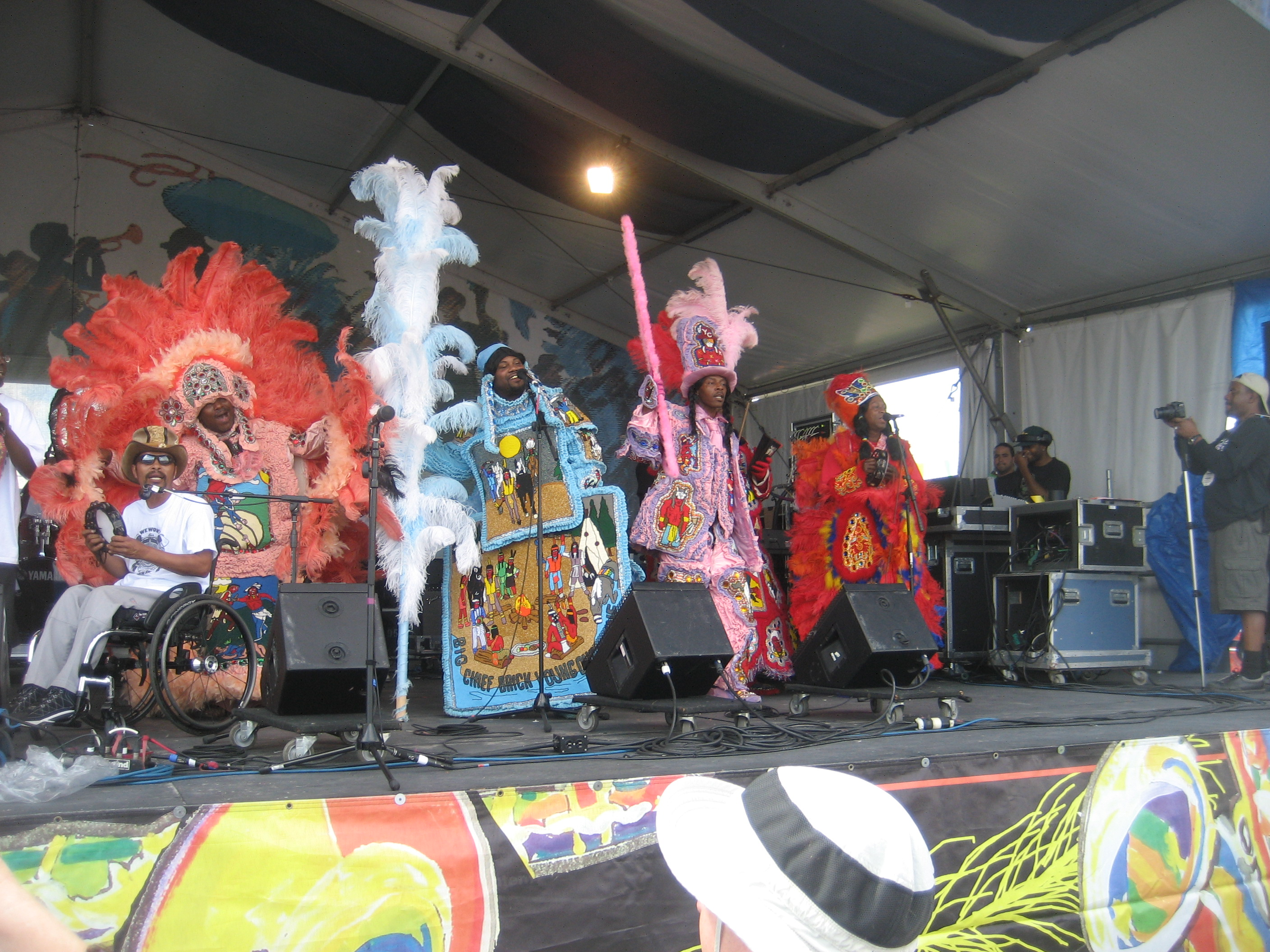
Mardi Gras Indians wear suits to honor the historic alliance between the Seminole people and Black Seminoles.

- Through musical performance, Mardi Gras Indians in New Orleans, Louisiana, share the story of how their ancestors escaped slavery. The Young Seminole Hunters, a Mardi Gras Indian tribe, sew detailed suits to honor the Seminoles’ role in freeing enslaved Black people.
- A sign at the Manatee Mineral Spring marks the location where traces of Angola were uncovered
- Fort Mose Historic State Park in Florida is a National Historic Landmark at the site of the first free Black community in the United States
- A large sign at Bill Baggs Cape Florida State Park commemorates the site where hundreds of African Americans escaped to freedom in the Bahamas in the early 1820s, as part of the National Underground Railroad Network to Freedom Trail.
- Red Bays, Andros, the historic settlement of Black Seminoles in the Bahamas, and Nacimiento, Mexico are being recognized as related international sites on the Network to Freedom Trail.

== Notable Black Seminoles ==
- Dosar Barkus, band leader from 1892 through allotment, namesake for contemporary band
- Caesar Bruner, band leader from Reconstruction through statehood, namesake for contemporary band
- Eugene Bullard, one of the first Black American military pilots
- Sidney Dearing (1870–1953), businessperson in California
- John Horse, leader at the time of removal, founder of Wewoka, and co-leader of 1849 escape to northern Mexico
- Johanna July, horsebreaker
- Sergeant John Ward
- Adam Paine was born in 1843 to Black Seminole parents near Alachua, Florida and became a Black Seminole Indian Scout and Medal of Honor Recipient
- Pompey Factor and Isaac Payne - Medal of Honor recipients for their service in the 24th Infantry.

== See also ==
- Afro-Seminole Creole
- African Diaspora
- Black Indians in the United States
- Black Seminole Scouts
- Ian Hancock
- Lorenzo Dow Turner
- List of topics related to Black and African people
- One-Drop Rule
- Runaway slaves in Spanish Florida
- Zambo
