= John Horse =

Black Seminole war leader (c. 1812–1882)

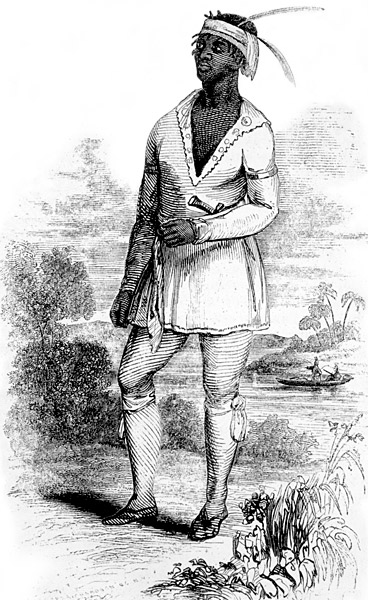
Speculative portrait of John Horse from The Origin, Progress, and Conclusion of the Florida War, 1848

John Horse (c. 1812–1882), also known as Juan Caballo, Juan Cavallo, John Cowaya (with spelling variations) and Gopher John, was a man of mixed African and Seminole ancestry who fought alongside the Seminoles in the Second Seminole War in Florida. He rose to prominence in the third year of what was to become a seven-year war when the first generation of Black Seminole leaders was largely decimated and the charismatic Seminole war leader Osceola (Asi Yahola) was taken prisoner by the American military commander, General Thomas Sydney Jesup.

== Biography ==
=== Early life and education ===
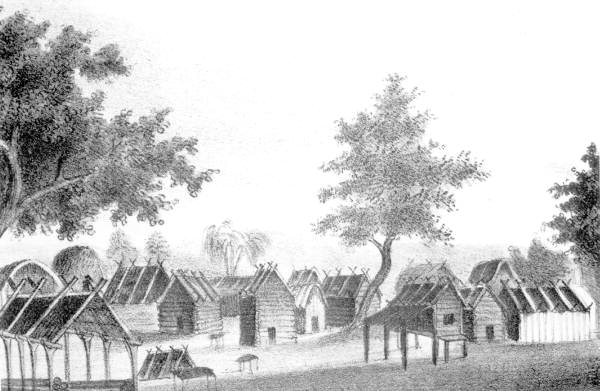
Seminole town (Lithograph published in 1837)

John Horse, called Juan as a child, was born around 1812 in Florida. He was a Black American slave of Seminole, Spanish, and Black American descent. He lived initially in the region that came to be called Micanopy after the last head chief of the Florida Seminole in north central Florida. John assumed the surname of his father and nominal owner, the Seminole trader Charley Cavallo, his surname "Horse" being believed to have been a translation of Cavallo (or Caballo, the Spanish word for horse). His mother was likely of pure African descent, a slave acquired by Charley Cavallo in his travels. Charley was, himself, of possibly mixed descent (Indian-Spanish parentage.). The young John also had a sister, Juana (sometimes spelled "Wannah" or "Warner" in some sources). Not much is known about Charley Cavallo although it does not appear that he treated either of his two mixed-race children as slaves.

The War of 1812, the Creek War and the Patriot War in Florida were a series of related conflicts around the time that John Horse is thought to have been born. At that time he and Juana were probably living with their mother in one of the black settlements affiliated with, and under the jurisdiction of, the Alachua band of Oconee Seminole along the Suwannee River (see Bolek's "old town"). In 1818, when the American General Andrew Jackson invaded the area, he scattered the tribal peoples and their black allies in the region, destroying settlements and seizing blacks from among the Seminole for removal to the north to be returned to plantation slavery. John was probably displaced with his family by these actions since he first enters the historical record some years later as a young adolescent in the Tampa area.

John Horse spent his formative years among the Oconee Seminole, living like other Indian boys, learning to hunt and fish and developing tracking skills. He also became proficient with bow and arrow and with a rifle, developing a reputation in later life as a keen marksman with a steady hand in combat. Unlike many of his fellows, however, he also learned to read and write and acquired linguistic skills in English, Spanish and the Hitchiti tongue spoken by the Oconee and many other Seminole bands. We can presume that he was also conversant with Muscogee, the tongue of the Upper Creek Indians (see also Red Sticks) from whom the great Seminole war chief, Osceola hailed (see also Peter McQueen) because, in his adult years, he would be one of Osceola's main translators when dealing with the Americans (though Osceola, himself, spoke some English).

=== Seminole Wars ===
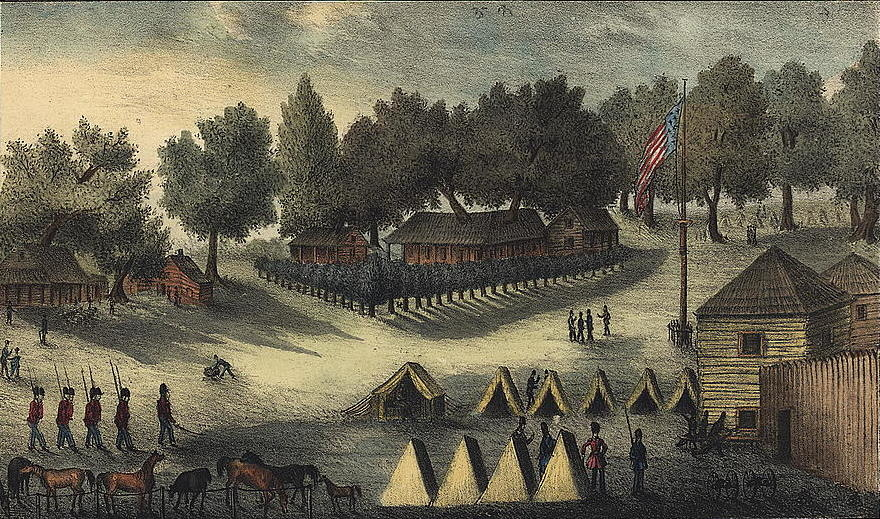
Fort Brooke at Tampa Bay

The First Seminole War (1817–1818) occurred during Horse's childhood and the youngster, along with his sister and mother, was probably among those displaced blacks who fled south of the Suwannee River toward Tampa Bay. There young John grew into adolescence and came into contact with American soldiers who had established an outpost, Fort Brooke, in the region with the formal annexation of Florida after the success of Jackson's incursions. John Horse first enters the written record in a short narrative by the officer in charge, Major George M. Brooke, who discovered the young Seminole black had been swindling his personal cook by selling him the same land turtle, or tortoise (a so-called "gopher"), multiple times for the major's personal mess. Discovering the young boy's fraud, Brooke opted for leniency and let John go on condition he make good on the missing turtles which he apparently did. This began a lifelong relationship between John Horse and the American military and vouchsafed him his nickname in later life, Gopher John.

He would go on to fight against the American army, on the side of his fellow Seminole, and, eventually, to work with the Americans. During the Second Seminole War of 1835 to 1842, which began when American settlers pressured for Indian removal to free up their lands for white settlement, John Horse served as what would be called, today, a field officer on the Indian side. At first a translator for the Indian leaders (since few of them spoke English while their black allies did), he also became a lower level war chief. Because of his facility with languages and quickness of mind, John Horse eventually found himself in the midst of the Seminoles' negotiations with the U. S. Army as the war dragged on and open battles in the field gave way to guerrilla tactics and a long war of attrition.

In the spring of 1838, after several pitched battles, Horse finally decided the fight against the Americans was unwinnable and surrendered to US troops. This may have been prompted by the loss of his first wife, a Seminole woman said to have been a daughter of Chief Holatoochee, a brother or nephew of the chief Micanopy. The blacks in the war received promises of freedom if they would cease fighting as Indian allies and accept resettlement in the newly established Indian Territory west of the Mississippi.

Horse was later granted papers freeing him a second time by General William J. Worth for the services he subsequently rendered to the U.S. Army in the latter days of the Second Seminole War in Florida, as both translator and scout. But his initial decision to give up fighting had been in response to the offer of a prior general, Thomas Sydney Jesup, who had made the first promise of general freedom to all escaped slaves and their children willing to surrender and accept removal. Thus John Horse's claim to freedom from slavery would rest on at least two legal claims, via decisions by two different American military officers. This would eventually be important as events unfolded a few years later in the west. Unfortunately, Horse's second wife and their children, who were removed to Indian Territory with him, did not gain freedom through his later service and had only the earlier declaration by Jesup to fall back on, thus remaining at risk from the increasingly aggressive activities of slave catchers in the new Indian Territory.

With other Seminole, Horse was shipped across the Gulf of Mexico from Tampa Bay to New Orleans and north from there by way of the Mississippi to Indian Territory. There he and his family joined with the other Seminole and Black Seminole who had accepted removal to take up residence at one of two locations assigned to the Seminole inside the Creek area. Horse quickly rose as a leader among the Black Seminole because of his friendly relations with the Americans, his experience as a leader in the fighting, his linguistic skills and decisive cleverness.

=== Life in Indian Territory ===
==== New conflicts and old issues ====
In the new territory, John Horse worked sporadically for the army as an interpreter and, sometimes, as an intermediary for the officers and the Indian leaders. Asked to help persuade the remaining Indian fighters in Florida to surrender and relocate to Indian Territory as he and others had done, he returned to Florida in 1839 to act as go-between with one of the last Seminole war chiefs, Coacoochee (Wild Cat), eventually convincing his old friend to accept the inevitable and come in, too. John Horse was sent back to Indian Territory in 1842, as part of a group of about 120 other exiles, once the army felt he had done what they needed.

In Indian Territory again, the exiled Seminole leadership finally voted freedom for John Horse, too, around the year 1843 in light of his services to the Seminole during their lengthy war. At the time the main chief, Micanopy (Mico Nuppa), had nominal ownership over him. It was Micanopy, in concert with his council, who finally granted the black warrior his freedom from any claims of enslavement against him which the tribe still had. Thus John Horse had been freed three times: by Jesup's original declaration, by General Worth who was Jesup's last successor (for services rendered), and by the Seminole leadership. Only the first of these actions applied to John Horse's second wife, Susan (daughter of the black leader July) and their children, however, and that action would soon come into serious question.

Conflict arose in the Territory because the transplanted Seminole had been placed on land allocated to the Creek Indians since the U.S. government had failed to recognize the tribal distinctions between the two peoples (the Seminole were a loose amalgam of Creek bands which had detached themselves from the Creek Indian federation a century earlier and relocated to then Spanish Florida, although they had continued to maintain ethnic and some kinship ties with their northern Creek brethren in Georgia, Alabama and part of the Carolinas). Because the Creek had adopted the American institution of chattel slavery while the Seminole had not done the same (they lived in very different ways), the presence of free blacks among the Seminole on Creek land and under the nominal sovereignty of the Creek tribal council, caused friction between the two groups. The free blacks threatened the Creek slave-holding status quo, because their very existence tempted the Creeks' own slaves to challenge their status, and provided a tempting target for Creek and affiliated groups seeking to acquire more slaves.

Creek slavers and those from other Indian groups, and some whites, soon began raiding the Black Seminole settlements to kidnap and enslave anyone they could get their hands on, and John Horse quickly became a focal point for organizing resistance to these encroachments as well as lead spokesman for his fellow Black Seminoles. In one case, when some slavers succeeded in capturing Dembo Factor, a veteran of the Seminole War, John Horse and his on-again, off-again ally, Coacoochee (Wild Cat), who had hopes of succeeding Micanopy as leader of all the Seminole and who opposed living under the Creek, protested. The Army, responding to their concerns, demanded and got Factor's release but neither they nor the Creek tribal council pursued charges of kidnapping against the suspected slavers. The slave raids continued as tensions mounted.

==== Seeking a solution ====
In 1844 John Horse traveled to Washington, D.C., with a delegation of Seminole including Coacoochee to argue for a separate land grant for the Seminole on the grounds that they were and had been a separate people for at least a hundred years. Failing to secure the backing they needed, they returned to Indian Territory, but Horse traveled once more to Washington, this time on his own (acting as servant to an officer's brother) to lobby General Jesup to live up to his earlier promises. Jesup was sympathetic and probably felt a little guilty for having been instrumental in the treachery that took Osceola off the field and led to that chief's death. However he could not overcome political resistance in Washington where pressure was growing to reverse his grant of freedom to the blacks who came in voluntarily. Perhaps in response to John's advocacy, Jesup traveled to Indian Territory himself (he was now Quartermaster General for the entire U.S. Army) to arrange for the construction of new facilities at Fort Gibson, the army's headquarters in the Territory. While there he compiled a list of all those who had surrendered under his order and validated it. He also offered them work on the grounds of Fort Gibson on a construction project he had initiated.

As a result, large numbers of Seminole blacks left the two Seminole settlements, Deep Fork and Little River, to re-settle outside the fort's walls under army protection. Once the work was done, however, the blacks chose to remain because of the ongoing predations of Creek, Cherokee and so-called half breed slave catchers, creating yet another flash point of contention with the army and the slaver gangs. John Horse, himself, was attacked by unknown assailants at one point, thought to have been members of the pro-Creek Seminole faction and came close to death from the bullet he took, but the would-be assassins were never located. After the incident, the officer in charge at Fort Gibson invited John and his family to take up residence inside the fort, which he did, giving up the claim he had staked out in the Indian area. The tensions extended to the Seminole Indian sub-agent, Marcellus Duval, an Alabamian with land holdings back east and connections in Washington. His brother, William Duval, was also a connected attorney at nearby Fort Smith in Arkansas. The Seminole sub-agent hoped to profit with the restoration of the Seminole blacks' slave status and angled incessantly to bring it about. He also began objecting to what he deemed the army's unauthorized protection of the Seminole blacks, including allowing them to remain in their makeshift settlement under Fort Gibson's walls.

==== Slavery again? ====
Some time after John Horse's return from his second mission to Washington, and Jesup's own visit and subsequent return east, John Y. Mason, US Attorney-General at the time, was designated by President James K. Polk to rule on the legitimacy of Jesup's emancipation of the former Seminole slaves. The demand for such a ruling was being pushed by Duval and his allies and urged by his brother, the attorney William Duval, who had been retained by the Seminole tribal council, at the sub-agent's urging, to reclaim their rights to their former slaves. John Mason, a southerner, ruled that, since most of the Black Seminoles were descendants of fugitive slaves and thus legally still considered born into slavery, Jesup's decree had illegally deprived their Seminole owners of their legal property and could not be endorsed by the government. Thus the very reason many of the blacks had agreed to come in peacefully, and which had so seriously undermined the Seminoles' fight to remain in Florida, was suddenly and retroactively revoked.

Seminole practice in Florida had acknowledged slavery, though not on the chattel slavery model then common in the American south. It was, in fact, more like feudal dependency since slaves of the Seminole generally lived in their own communities, carried weapons and hunted and fought beside the Seminole they were nominally owned by. In fact, except for the obligation of the blacks to join in hunting and war parties, and to supply an annual tribute of crops to the tribal chief for the general welfare of the tribe, there was little effective difference between how the Seminole lived and the lives of their nominal slaves. This changed in the course of the Second Seminole War when the old tribal system broke down under the pressure of the fighting and the Seminole resolved themselves into loose war bands living off the land with no distinction between tribal members and their so-called slaves. But this changed yet again in the new territory when the Seminole were obliged to settle on fixed lots of land and take up settled agriculture.

At that point the chattel slave model adopted by their Creek cousins and other displaced tribes in the region took on more attraction for many of the Seminole. Their increasing poverty, due to the poor land they had been given and their own farming inexperience also made regaining a source of slave labor attractive to them (since the blacks were generally better farmers and craftsmen than their "owners"). The Seminole sub-agent, Marcellus Duval, became a tireless advocate for restoration of alleged Seminole property rights over their former allies in the field, a restoration he apparently hoped to turn to his own benefit as much as to the Indians'.

With Mason's reversal of Jesup's wartime decree, those who had been freed by Jesup now suddenly found their status reversed, as Duval and the pro-Creek Seminole demanded their return to Seminole service, only now as chattel slaves. A new open season by the raiders from nearby groups and towns was about to commence as more than 280 Black Seminoles, including John Horse's own family, were now at risk again.

Duval, who had slave interests of his own, then effectively procured a decision from Washington that would force the blacks living under the army's protection at Fort Gibson to return to the settlements of those Indians who were now deemed their legal owners. The Indian sub-agent had, in fact, already worked out an agreement with the pro-Creek faction within the Seminole tribal council to provide a large number of the re-enslaved blacks to his lawyer brother in payment for legal services rendered on their behalf in Washington in pursuit of their property rights over the Seminole blacks. He and his brother apparently hoped to turn a profit by claiming so many of the new slaves, either to work on their family holdings back in Alabama or for sale on the open market.

The stage was thus set for a major crisis as the army received orders to evict the blacks then sheltering under Fort Gibson's walls and force their return to enslavement under the Seminole, now headed up by the pro-Creek faction who supported the institution of chattel slavery as practiced back east. John Horse, with all his options exhausted and even the government and its army turned against him, faced a decision.

==== Migration ====
Although the army generals were friendly to John Horse and his interests, they were bound by their duty. The War Department, from whom the army took its direction, and the Bureau of Indian Affairs were now arrayed against the interests of the Seminole blacks. John Horse soon found himself allied with Coacoochee again as the two fought a rear guard action to halt the rise of the pro-Creek leadership among the Seminole and the loss of freedom for the Seminole blacks. The two men wrangled with the various generals who quickly succeeded one another while the generals, themselves, played a delaying game with their Washington superiors. Eventually, however, Micaonopy's death ended the stalemate and the army could no longer delay evicting the ad hoc black settlement around the fort and sending its people back to certain enslavement. John Horse took charge of the exodus from Fort Gibson but, instead of taking his people to the site Duval the Indian agent had selected for them close by his agency, Horse and another ally, the black scout Toney Barnet, settled them at a place on the Little River he named Wewoka farther from the Creek and the Seminole agency than Duval had counted on. Settling in, they set up defenses against the gangs of slavers who quickly flocked around the black settlement. John Horse and Barnet settled on a plan which involved getting Marcellus Duval out of the way by inducing him to head off to Florida on a temporary mission which he thought would redound to his interest. To facilitate his agreement to make the trip, Barnet, also affiliated with the Seminole, offered to serve as scout and translator. (Barnet had reasons of his own for remaining behind since he was working to free his son who had been enslaved by two Cherokee brothers on Cherokee land within Indian Territory.)

While Duval was gone with Barnet, John Horse speedily concluded a pact with his old friend Coacoochee (disaffected because of his failure to be selected to replace Micanopy) and the two of them led an exodus from Wewoka, and Indian Territory in general, in the dead of night. They led over a hundred blacks including men, women and children, and at least as many fleeing Seminole, out of the lands they had been placed on by the government, heading south across the Red River into Texas. There they began a dash across that vast state which would take them nearly a year, eventually incurring pursuit by Duval's slavers (dispatched after he had returned and discovered their flight) and the Texas Rangers who had been authorized by the Texas governor to recapture and return them to their Seminole owners (and to Duval who had placed a bounty on each man, woman and child). From October 1849 until the summer of 1850, Horse and Coacoochee led the migration south, picking up a troop of disgruntled Kickapoo Indians along the way, and facing the war arrows of the Comanche who considered Coacoochee's presence in their territory an affront. The Comanche may have known of an agreement Coacoochee had concluded with representatives of the Mexican government to gain land on which to live once in Mexico in exchange for his service on the border repelling Texan and Comanche raiders.

==== Racing to the border ====
After a pitched battle with the Comanche, the fleeing party had to cross a desert region, meeting up with an old adversary, Major John T. Sprague, at the springs of Las Moras just north of the Mexican border. That encounter is described in Sprague's own journals which he compiled to document an expedition of supply wagons he led across southern Texas to resupply the outpost at today's El Paso (then the town of Franklin). Sprague had been a young captain back in Florida and had known both John Horse and Wild Cat there, having been involved in the latter's initial and then his final surrender. The three men sat into the night reminiscing and drinking from a bottle of liquor Sprague had supplied. But some time in the early morning hours the Indians learned that someone from the army camp had secretly gone to a nearby town to alert the Texas Rangers of their presence. Whether Sprague, himself, was implicated remains unknown.

In the pre-dawn hours John Horse and Coacoochee woke their people and secretly departed the camp at Las Moras to make a last desperate dash to the Rio Grande. There they built makeshift rafts to ferry their people across. They were still hard at it, only midway across the river, when the Rangers and their allies abruptly arrived. But it was too late and the Seminole and their black allies, with the Kickapoo who had joined them, got across and made contact with officials in the Mexican state of Coahuila. There, in return for a pledge to fight all invaders and raiding parties from Texas, they were given land for their people and captaincies in the Mexican army on or about July 12, 1850.

=== Later life ===
John Horse liked to drink and at one point after crossing back into Texas he allowed himself to get too drunk and was taken captive by some local whites who may have known him or had a grudge against him. They offered to ransom him back to his people and Coacoochee collected the gold they demanded and sent it to them for John's life. When they opened the bag they found the gold soaked with blood. It was Coacoochee's message to them and they fled. For several years John Horse and Coacoochee rode side by side in fulfillment of their contract with the Mexican government but Coacoochee soon died from smallpox and most of the Seminole and Kickapoo who had followed him drifted away. John Horse remained with his people and became the settlement's de facto leader.

After the American Civil War and United States emancipation of slaves, the US Army recruited many of the Black Seminoles from Mexico to serve in the border states as scouts. John Horse was getting too old for that kind of active service although he remained titular leader of his people, still captaining their fights against the various raiding parties which descended on Mexico from the north.

In one famous incident he returned with his men to find that a large Indian raiding party had attacked his settlement and captured many of his people in retaliation for his actions against them in his capacity of providing border security. Leading all the able bodied men he could find (about forty, including teenage boys) he took off after the Indians. The raiders tried to draw the Seminole blacks into a canyon but John Horse, sensing the trick, ordered a halt and dismounted his men. He had been a wily commander back in Florida and still possessed a well-developed perceptive faculty for this sort of thing. When the Indians lying in wait within the canyon saw that the blacks were not deceived by their ruse, they made a head-on frontal assault against the black force. John Horse's men had only single load rifles, mostly of vintage type, and when they had discharged their first volley it failed to turn the Indians who just kept coming at them. As the men scrambled to reload their weapons, John Horse stepped out in front of his men and leveled his own empty weapon at the oncoming chief, taking deliberate and careful aim. He had always been a crack shot and the Indians knew it. When the chief saw John's rifle directed straight at him he lost his nerve and swerved his horse, all those behind following him, thus breaking the charge and giving John Horse's men and boys time to complete their reload. In the end, the Indians fled and John Horse's Seminole blacks retrieved their people.

As John Horse aged, though, many of his people migrated back across the Texas border to work for the U.S. Army as scouts. These men and their families settled near Fort Clarke in what is now Brackettville.

=== Death ===
In his seventies, John Horse faced another crisis when local land owners tried to take the land the Mexican government had originally given to the Seminole settlers. John Horse rode out once more, to Mexico City, to obtain reaffirmation from the government of their land grant and to put a stop to the local land grab. He was never heard from again and it is commonly thought that he died on this trip to the capital (in 1882). Several hundred descendants of Black Seminoles, known as Mascogos, still reside in Coahuila today.

== Personal life ==
Horse is said to have been Catholic.

== See also ==
- Gaspar Yanga
- John Caesar (Seminole)
- Abraham (Seminole)
