= John Caesar (Seminole) =

Black Seminole soldier (died 1837)

- Born: c. 1770s
- Died: January 17, 1837 near St. Augustine, Florida
- Citizenship: Seminole
- Employer(s): interpreter for Ee-mat-la, military leader
- Known for: freeing enslaved people

John Caesar (c. 1770s – January 17, 1837) was a Black Seminole lieutenant and interpreter to Ee-mat-la, hereditary chief of the St. Johns River Seminoles in Florida. In Joshua Giddings' history of the wars against the Seminole, Caesar was described as "an old man and somewhat of a privileged character among both Indians and Exiles." Recent scholarship has deemed him a "primary instigator of the destruction of plantations in East Florida by primarily Black Seminoles and plantation slaves," partially validating the thesis that the Seminole Wars should be considered slave rebellions as much as wars for Indigenous survival.

== Enslavement ==
In the context of American colonization in the Florida Territory, Caesar was considered one of the "Indian slaves" or Exiles, rather than a more recent "runaway plantation slave." Many of the Exiles had fled from slavery in South Carolina and Georgia during the disruption of the American Revolutionary War (1776–1783) and then collaborated with British, and later Spanish, soldiers and traders. Historian Anthony Dixon writes that while Caesar's personal history is somewhat obscure, "His mastery of the English language suggests either an early childhood in plantation society or rearing by slave parents." Caesar was a "plantation slave" surname rather than a name of West African origin, like those held by some Black Seminoles, suggesting that Caesar's family origins were in the American colonies or states; a number of people with the surname Caesar later moved to the newly assigned Seminole territory in what is now Oklahoma, suggesting he may have had surviving kinsmen or descendants that migrated with the tribe. His wife was enslaved on a plantation in the area and he visited both her and other plantations on a regular basis, which was part of what allowed him to form insurrectionary networks and gather intelligence.

== Military service ==
Caesar was a combatant during the Second Seminole War in Florida, known for his participation in battles and raids from 1835 to 1837, as well as for recruiting local slaves to flee their plantations and join forces with the Seminoles against the United States. In December 1835 "the Seminole Indians under the chief, Philip [Ee-mat-la], together with a small party of Uchees, and a number of Indian negroes, estimated from 80 to 120, came to New Smyrna, south of Mosquito inlet, took possession of and plundered the house of Mr. Dunham. Parties of them scattered about the neighbouring plantations of Cruger and Depeyster and Mr. Hunter. The Indian negro, John Casar, endeavored to decoy Mr. Hunter from his house, on pretence of selling him cattle and horses. He, however, having heard from his negroes, that large numbers of Indians were about, refused to go, and in the afternoon crossed the river to Col. Dummett's." After a 10-day siege against Edmund Gaines' troops on the Withlacoochee River, John Caesar was sent by the Seminoles to negotiate with the Americans, who had eaten all their horses to survive. However, shortly after a ceasefire was declared, "Osceola and two other Indians came under a flag of truce to the army camp. No sooner had the parley begun, however, when the relief expedition under General Duncan Clinch arrived and immediately opened fire. Two Indians and one Negro were killed. Osceola and the others fled, charging bad faith."

Previously a fairly cautious combatant, in line with the policies of Negro Abram and the "elderly Seminole chiefs" like Emanthla and Micanopy, in late 1836 he turned to guerrilla warfare in earnest, in response to the arrival of "zealous" American General Thomas Jesup. Caesar organized several mixed-composition platoons of about a dozen guerrillas; per Dixon his final platoon was composed of two Black Seminoles, two Indigenous Seminoles, one free black, and approximately eight recently escaped fugitive slaves.

== Death ==
Caesar was killed on the Williams plantation about 30 miles from St. Augustine on the night of January 17, 1837, along with the young "free Negro" Joe Merritt, son of Stephen Merritt, and another man, unidentified, in a counterattack following a failed horse-stealing raid closer to St. Augustine.

== See also ==
- Abraham (Seminole)
- Runaway slaves in Spanish Florida
