= Johanna July =

Horsebreaker (c. 1860–1942)

Johanna "Chona" July (c. 1860 – 1942) was a skilled horsebreaker and member of the Black Seminole community.

== Biography ==
Johanna was born near Nacimiento, Mexico in approximately 1860. Her ancestors had been forced to migrate from Florida to Nacimiento, by way of Fort Gibson, Oklahoma, following the Indian Removal Act. She was born to Jennie Bruner (also spelled Bruno). Some narrative refer to her father with the last name Philips, likely Black Seminole U.S. Army scout Ned Philips. Others claim her father was Elijah July. In 1870, Ned Philips joined the Black Seminole scouts in exchange for land and American citizenship.

Johanna, her parents, and her brother Joseph moved to Fort Duncan, where her father broke horses for the army, farmed, and raised livestock while serving brief enlistment periods. While Black Seminole work was typically divided by gender, Johanna Phillips was fond of horses and became an expert horse breaker. When her father died shortly after his last enlistment in 1872 and her brother moved away, Phillips took over his work.

When Phillips turned eighteen, she married army scout Carolina July. However, their marriage soon fell apart due to her lack of domestic skills and his violence. One night after an argument, Johanna July snuck to a neighbor's house, where she stole a horse and fled to her mother's home. Though Carolina tried to capture or kill her many times, she eluded him. Carolina July died in 1884.

After 1880, July married Alexander "Alex" Wilkes, with whom she had four children. By 1900, she was widowed. Johanna married again in 1909 to Charles Lasley. The pair ran a successful business raising cattle, breaking horses, and selling hides. Lasley died in 1925.

In the 1930s, July recounted her life to WPA writer Florence Angermiller.

July died on January 18, 1942, in Brackettville, Texas. She was buried in the Seminole Cemetery (now the Seminole Indian Scouts Cemetery).
