= Ee-mat-la =

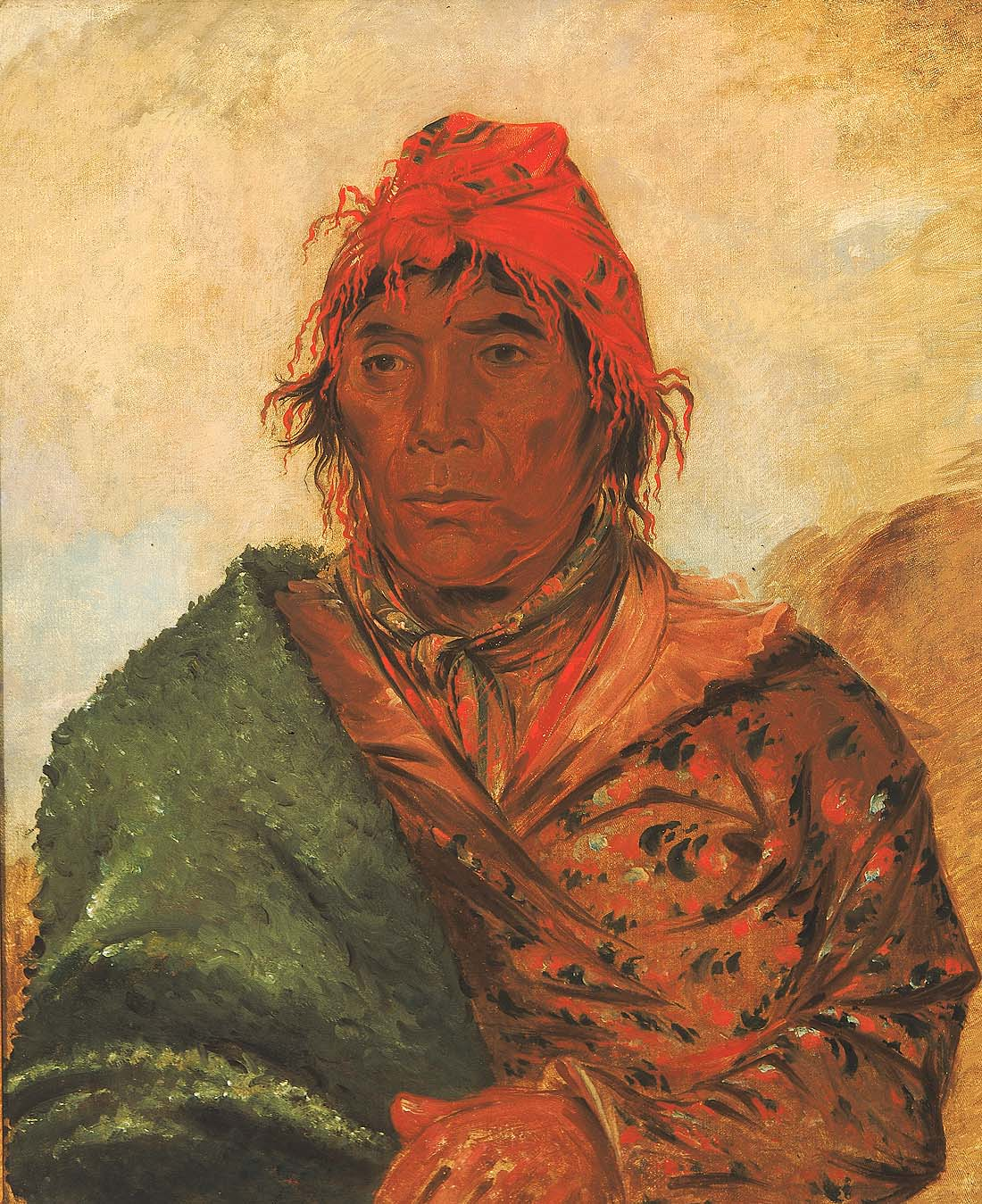
Ee-mat-la, painting by George Catlin (1838)

Ee-mat-la, also known as King Phillip, (9 October 1739 – 8 October 1839) was a Seminole chief during the Second Seminole War.

He was captured while camped at Dunlawton plantation, and held at Fort Marion. He died while being transported west in 1839.

He was "also a very aged chief, who has been a man of great notoriety and distinction in his time, but has now got too old for further warlike enterprize."

His son was Coacoochee (Wild Cat).

== See also ==
- John Caesar (Seminole)
