= Abraham (Seminole) =

Seminole interpreter (1790s–1870s)

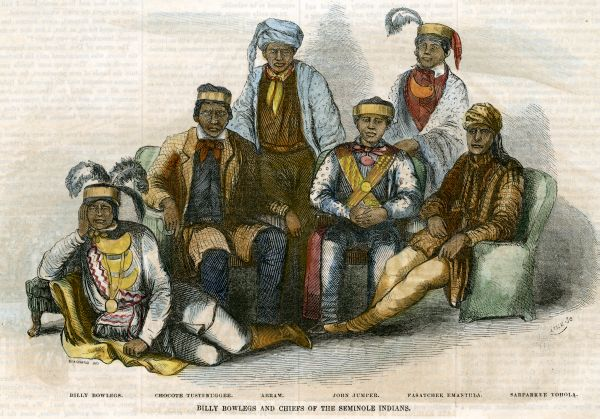
Hand-colored etching based on a daguerreotype made in New York in 1852 of Seminole leaders Billy Bowlegs, Thlocklo Tustenuggee, Abram, John Jumper, Fasatchee Emanthla, and Sarparkee Yohola.

Abraham, Seminole war-name Souanaffe Tustenukke, called Yobly by some whites, was a 19th-century Floridian who served as an interpreter and lieutenant for "Micanopy, the hereditary leader of the Alachua Seminoles." As of July 1837, he was termed "the principal negro chief" of the Seminoles and by all accounts exerted a great influence on Micanopy, approximately 500 Black Seminoles, and the white Americans with whom he treated and negotiated.

== Biography ==
Abraham was born enslaved in Georgia in the 1790s and died in the 1870s in what is now Seminole County, Oklahoma. He was described as having ties to Pensacola, having traveled to Washington, D.C., and the Indian Territory, and having had "fluent speech and polished manners." He is sometimes described as Micanopy's "chief negro" in parallel with John Caesar, who was deemed "chief negro" to Ee-mat-la. Abraham, sometimes called Negro Abram, was a key participant in the 1837–38 negotiations regarding the end of hostilities in the Second Seminole War, a potential move to the Indian Territory, and the legal status of "Indian slaves" versus "runaway plantation slaves." In 1813, a group of Blacks among the Seminoles established a settlement called Pilaklikaha (Many Ponds), that was renamed Abraham's Old Town after 1826 to honor Abraham, The Interpreter, who became a leader. The town was home to 100 people in who grew "fields of rice, beans, melons, pumpkins, and peanuts" and managed herds of cattle and horses; American troops burned Peliklakaha to the ground in 1836. Pilaklikaha was located about halfway between what is now Withlacoochee State Forest and Orlando.

== See also ==
- Runaway slaves in Spanish Florida

== Sources ==
- Porter, Kenneth W. (1971). The Negro on the American Frontier. The American Negro, His History and Literature. New York: Arno Press. ISBN 978-0-405-01983-8. LCCN 77135872. OCLC 153515.
- Watson, Samuel (2010). "7. Seminole Strategy, 1812–1858: A Prospectus for Further Research". pp. 155–180. doi:10.5744/florida/9780813035253.003.0007. in Belko, William S., ed. (2010). America's Hundred Years' War: U.S. Expansion to the Gulf Coast and the Fate of the Seminole, 1763–1858. Gainesville, Florida: University Press of Florida. ISBN 978-0-8130-4514-6. LCCN 2010024271. OCLC 801840927. Project MUSE book 19493.
