= David R. Colburn =

American academic

David R. Colburn (Sept. 29, 1942 - September 18, 2019) was a professor of history, author, and an administrator at the University of Florida in the United States.

== Early life and education ==
He was born in Providence, Rhode Island. He received an AB and MA in history from Providence College in the Army ROTC. He served in the Signal Corps in Vietnam in 1966 and achieved the rank of captain. After his return to the States, he earned a PhD from the University of North Carolina at Chapel Hill (UNC) in 1971. He taught at UNC and East Carolina University before joining the University of Florida's history department in 1972. He specialized in American history, including presidential, politics, the American South, and civil rights. He also served as a political consultant. He contributed to the Rosewood Report and also wrote for the Orlando Sentinel.

== Bibliography ==
- Racial Change and Community Crisis: St. Augustine, Florida, 1877-1980
- Florida's Megatrends with Lance deHaven-Smith (2010). Other books included African-American
- Government in the Sunshine State: Florida Since Statehood (1999) with Lance deHaven-Smith
- Government in the Sunshine: Florida Politics Since 1845
- From Yellow Dog Democrats to Red State Republicans: Florida and Its Politics Since 1940 (2007)
- Mayors: Race, Politics, and the American City (2001) with Jeffrey S. Adler
- The African American Heritage of Florida (1994) with Jane Landers, recipient of the Rembert W. Patrick Book Prize for best book in Florida history and a special commendation from the Association of State and Local History in 1996
