= Runaway slaves in Spanish Florida =

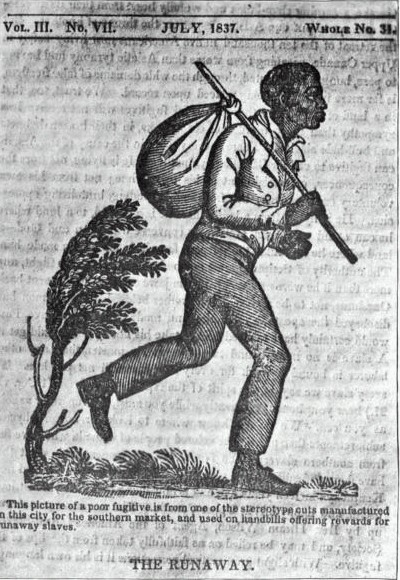
A runaway slave as portrayed in the American press

Runaway slaves in Spanish Florida describes the flight of enslaved African Americans from the British colonies of North America and the subsequent United States to the Spanish colony of Florida. Between the 17th and early 19th centuries thousands of enslaved people fled to Florida. The freedom seekers (runaway slaves) in Florida often took refuge among the Seminole Indians and became known as the Black Seminoles. Others formed communities in remote areas and were known as Maroons. The Spanish initially welcomed the runaways to their struggling colony. Some served in the Spanish militia defending Florida and, later, during the War of 1812, served with the British military opposing the United States. The Spanish and the Indian tribes refused to return runaway slaves to their British or American owners. With the purchase of Florida by the U.S. in 1821, large numbers of runaway slaves fled to freedom in the Bahamas. Runaway slaves are also described as fugitive slaves.

== First Spanish period ==
In October 1687, eleven African slaves—eight men, two women, and a three-year old child—arrived in St. Augustine after escaping from slavery in South Carolina. They were some of the first recorded runaway or fugitive slaves from the British colony to arrive in Florida. They had traveled by boat, making their way through the myriad waterways of the South Carolina and Georgia coasts. The next year a British official journeyed to St. Augustine to reclaim the Africans. The Spanish governor, Diego de Quiroga y Losada refused to surrender the former slaves. He said they had become Catholics and were employed. Six of the men were helping build the Castillo de San Marcos, two were working with a blacksmith, and the two women were domestic servants for the governor.

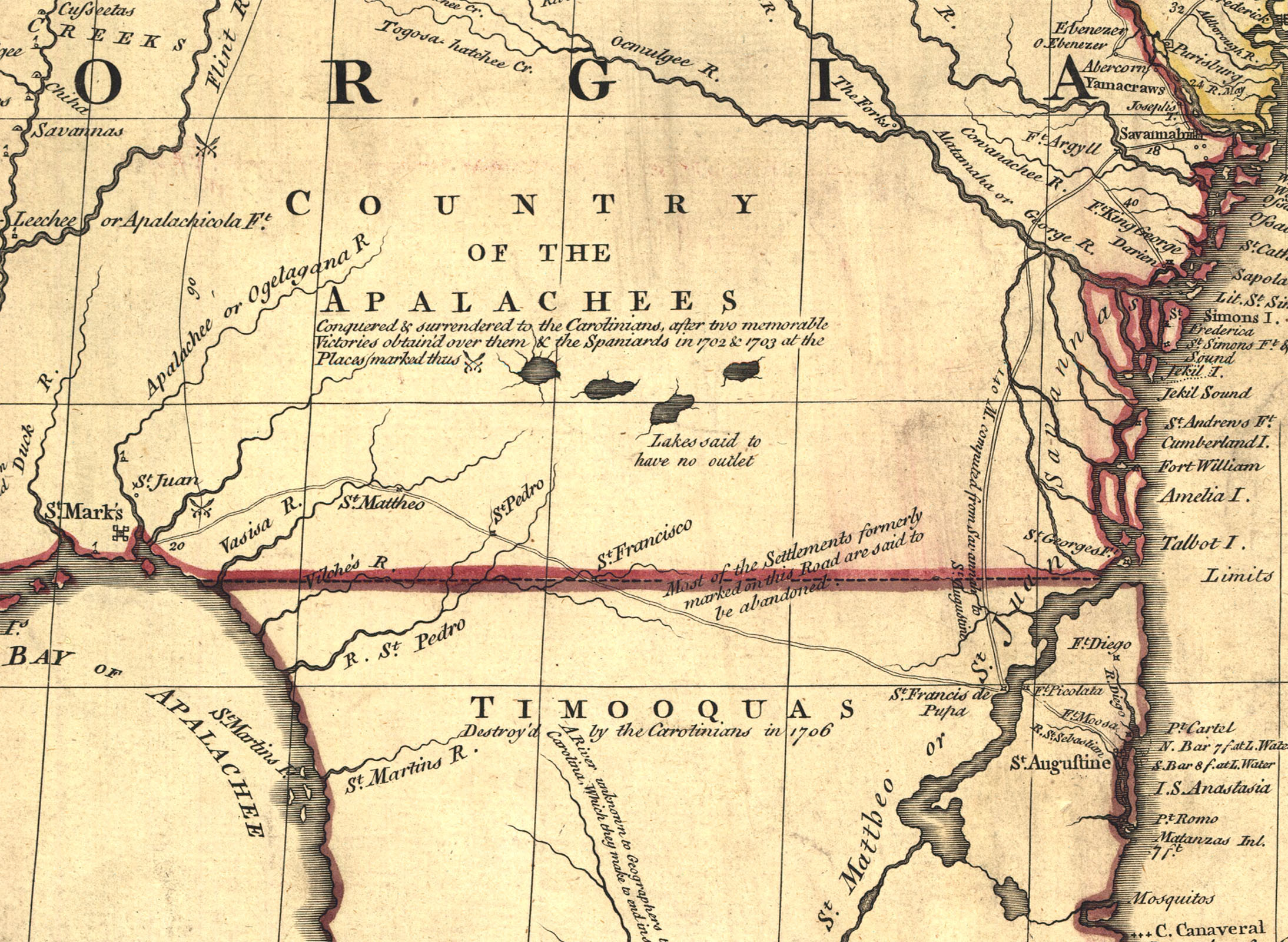
Spanish Florida in the early 18th century

In the late 17th century, St. Augustine in Spain's struggling Florida colony had a population of 1,400 made up of Spaniards, Native Americans (Indians), Canary Islanders, free and slave Black Africans, and mulattos. The Spanish were in a struggle for the control of North America with British and French colonizers. They were more liberal and generous in granting freedom and defining the legal status of slaves than were their rivals (although that liberality was routinely violated in the Latin American colonies of Spain). In 1693, King Carlos II issued a cedula on runaways that declared "liberty to all...so that by their example and by my liberality others will do the same." On the ground in Florida, Spanish officials welcomed the labor and military service the runaway slaves could contribute.

After 1700, the number of African slaves imported into the United States increased, especially in South Carolina as plantation agriculture began to dominate the economy. Working and living conditions for slaves became more stringent which resulted in more runaway slaves and slave revolts. One estimate is that 3,000 slaves in South Carolina escaped between the years of 1732 and 1782. Two-thirds of the escaping slaves were born in Africa as were many of the participants in slave revolts. In Georgia, a British colony not established until 1732, newspapers advertised 453 runaway slaves between 1763 and 1775. Not every runaway slave attempted to get to Spanish Florida. Some lived with or near Indian tribes; others formed maroon colonies in areas distant from British settlements.

In 1726, the Spanish established a black militia to defend the Florida colony from British and Indian slave raiders. In 1733, the Spanish codified the rules for reception of runaway slaves. The Royal Decree prohibited reimbursement of the British for runaway slaves and required four years of service by runaways to obtain freedom. The increasing military threat to Florida led the Spanish to establish Fort Mose, two miles north of St. Augustine. Fort Mose was the first free African settlement in North America. It was staffed initially by 38 men and their families. A Spanish soldier was nominally in charge, but Francisco Menéndez, born in Africa and a veteran of many years of warfare in Florida, was the leader of the group. In 1740, the British attacked Florida and Fort Mose was abandoned, but was rebuilt in 1752.

== Evacuation and British rule ==
During the Seven Years' War (1756–1763) the British captured the Spanish colonies of Cuba and the Philippines. The Treaty of Paris signed on February 10, 1763 returned those colonies to Spain but gave Great Britain the Spanish colony of Florida. The treaty granted Florida residents the right to depart Spanish Florida without hindrance for a period of 18 months. The great majority of Floridians, black, white, Indian, and mulatto, left for Cuba or Mexico.

The Spanish kept a careful record of those who departed the Spanish settlements of St. Augustine and Pensacola. Of 3,000 people who evacuated St. Augustine, more than 400 were persons of African descent or mulattos. Of more than 700, mostly military personnel and families, who evacuated Pensacola, Africans were not enumerated separately but were among the soldiers. Most of the Africans who went to Cuba were resettled in Regla.

The British ruled Florida for 20 years from 1763 to 1783. Up to 13,000 British, including about 8,000 African slaves, settled in Florida during the period. Most of the British people arriving in Florida were loyalists, opposed to American freedom from Britain and fleeing the American Revolution. They began to import slaves directly from Africa, with slaves outnumbering whites in Florida by a two to one margin. The increase in the numbers of slaves in Florida came partially because of the policies of British Governor James Grant who offered 50 acres (20 ha) of free land to every person, black or white, in a farming or plantation household.

The departure of the Spanish and their African and Indian allies and the rule of the British eliminated the sanctuary for runaway slaves that Florida had been. However, the runaways still had options among the American Indian tribes. The Cherokee reserved the right to decide to return or keep runaway slaves. In 1763, the Muscogee Creeks informed the British that they will seize and keep "any negro, horse, cattle, etc." found west of the Ogeechee River in eastern Georgia. Similarly in 1777, the Seminoles, then living near Tallahassee, said "Whatever Horses or Slaves or Cattle we take we expect to be ours." Slavery was a common practice among the Indians, but it was not usually as permanent nor as grueling as slavery among British and Americans. The Indians also purchased black slaves (40 head of cattle for one black slave was an average price).

By the beginning of the American Revolutionary War (1775–1783) runaway slaves had established several villages with a population of at least 430 people among the Seminoles. Runaway slaves living in close proximity to Indian villages were called Maroons. Runaway slaves from the American colonies living among Southeastern U.S. tribes usually supported the British side of the conflict. The British gave slaves to the Indians in exchange for their services as soldiers or laborers in the British Army. At the same time they offered freedom to slaves who served in their army.

== Second Spanish period ==
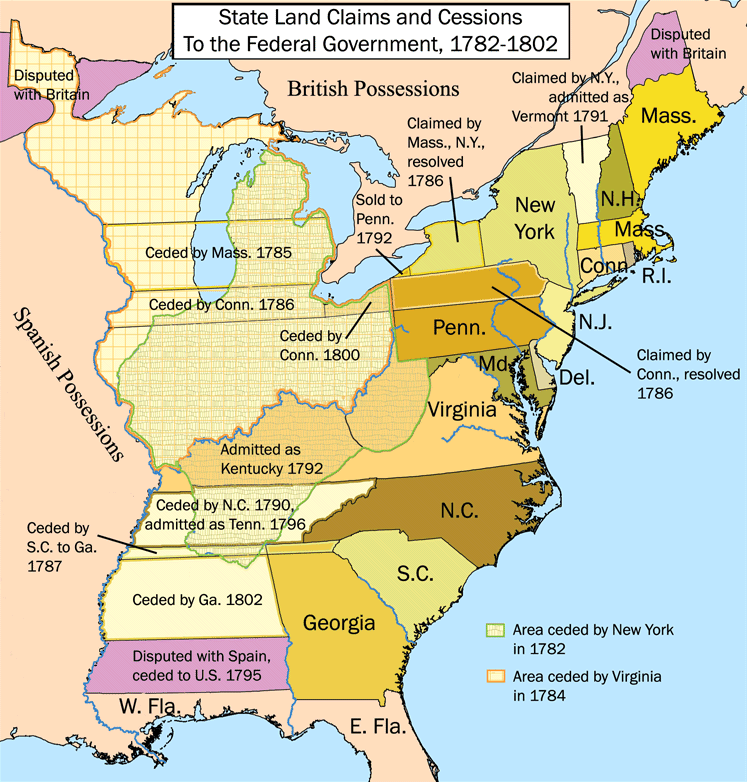
The United States and Spanish territory after the Revolutionary War.

The Treaty of Paris in 1783 recognized the independence of the United States from Britain and returned Florida to Spain. Chaos followed as American patriots, British loyalists, and returning Spaniards contended for land and slaves. Attempting to gain order and control, the new Spanish Governor, Vicente Manuel de Céspedes viewed the Africans in Florida as a cause of the trouble. He wished also not to antagonize the new United States which put a high priority on defending the rights of its citizens to own slaves. Cespedes decreed that all slaves had to be registered by their owners and all Africans and mulattos claiming their freedom had to present themselves to the government within 20 days to clarify their status and obtain a work permit. Two hundred and fifty-one came forward to declare their right to freedom. Many Africans in Florida did not hear of the decree and some who had a claim to freedom were enslaved again.

The European-settled part of Spanish Florida was less attractive as a refuge after 1783 than it had been earlier. Spain's control of the region was weak and its influence was hardly present outside St. Augustine and Pensacola. Runaway slaves, mostly from the American colonies, continued to seek freedom with the Indian tribes of the southeastern U.S., especially among the Seminole people living in western Florida at the time. The Maroons, consisting of runaway slaves, emancipated slaves, and slaves owned by the Seminole, formed communities, often in near proximity to Seminole villages. The Seminole provided the runaways (who often possessed no more than the clothes they wore) with land, axes and hoes, and charged them a percentage of their crops in return. Given their knowledge of the European colonists, the Maroons also served as interpreters and advisors.

Maroons, or Black Seminoles as they were also called, "lived in separate villages of well-built houses, raised crops of corn, sweet potatoes, other vegetables, and even cotton, and possessed herds of livestock." They wore Indian clothing and were "stout and even gigantic in their persons." They also were well armed. The Seminole mostly left the Maroons to themselves, although "receiving 'tribute' at harvest and butchering time." Estimates of the number of Maroons in Spanish Florida range from 300 to 1,000 (the total population, not counting Indians and runaway slaves, of Spanish Florida in the early 19th century was 8,000, about equally divided between whites and blacks).

== American annexation ==
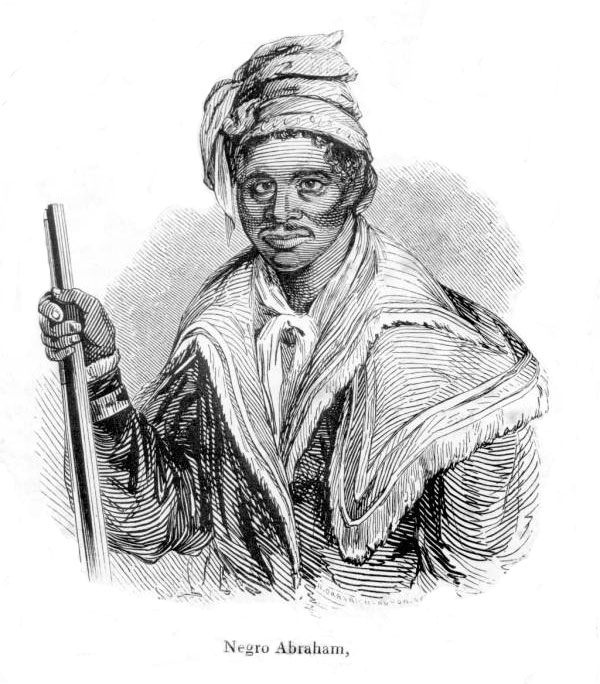
Abraham, a Black Seminole leader

The War of 1812 between the United States and Britain focused attention on the runaways in Florida. The British saw them as a military asset. The Americans accused the British of trying to incite a slave rebellion. In 1814, British soldiers, runaways, and Indians built the Negro Fort (also called Prospect Bluff Fort) on the Apalachicola River about 15 miles (24 km) from the Gulf of Mexico. It became a settlement of several hundred people, the largest settlement between St. Augustine and Pensacola. In 1815, the British departed the fort, but they left arms and ammunition behind. In 1816, Andrew Jackson attacked the fort, in an effort to eliminate Florida as a refuge for runaway slaves and to gain control of Florida for the U.S. An American artillery shell blew up the ammunition magazine in the fort, killing 300 people. Those captured after the explosion were given to Georgia slaveholders. Additional American incursions into Florida persuaded the Spanish to sell the colony to the United States in 1819. In 1821, the United States took control of Florida.

In 1823, in the Treaty of Moultrie Creek, the Seminoles gave up their lands in northern Florida and accepted a reservation in central Florida. The treaty, and subsequent migration of the Seminole, opened up all of northern Florida to plantation agriculture. The Seminole were obligated by the treaty to return runaway slaves who fled to their reservation. Their refusal to do so was a factor in the Seminole Wars of the 1830s and 1840s. The Black Seminoles and many of the Maroons living amongst the Seminoles also moved to the reservation.

=== Saltwater Railroad ===
The Saltwater Railroad dates back to 1818 when, after Andrew Jackson's invasion of what was still Spanish Florida, 200 runaway slaves and Black Seminoles fled Florida for the British colony of the Bahamas. The runaways, after making their way to the Atlantic Ocean coast of southern Florida, were transported by Bahamian fishing boats to the Bahamas if they had money to pay for their passage. If they didn't have money, they made the hazardous journey of about 100 miles (160 km) by handmade canoes. With the route established, by the 1830s more than 6,000 runaways from slave-holding countries, including the U.S., had found a home in the Bahamas. Most of the population in the Bahamas was black. Many runaway slaves from the United States settled on Andros Island in the community of Red Bays and became sponge divers or salvaged wrecked ships.

The British government declined to force the returnees to return to the United States and, in 1825, declared the runaways in the Bahamas as free as "any person who reaches British ground." This angered Southerners in the United States who complained of the "heinous" acts of the British.

== See also ==
- Black refugee (War of 1812)
