= Aboriginal title in the Taney Court =

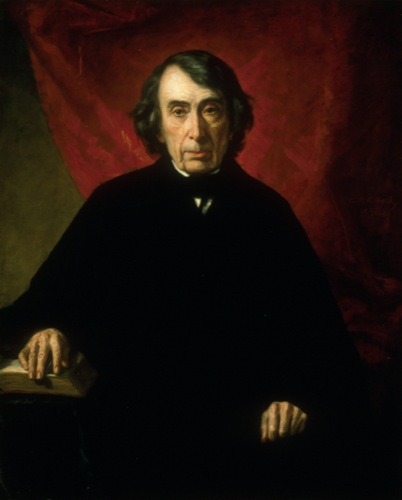
Chief Justice Roger B. Taney (1836–1864)

The Supreme Court of the United States, under Chief Justice Roger B. Taney (1836–1864), issued several important decisions on the status of aboriginal title in the United States, building on the opinions of aboriginal title in the Marshall Court.

The Taney Court heard Fellows v. Blacksmith (1857) and New York ex rel. Cutler v. Dibble (1858), the first two aboriginal title cases involving indigenous plaintiffs to reach the Supreme Court since Cherokee Nation v. Georgia (1830), and the first two cases won by indigenous parties in the Supreme Court. In Marsh v. Brooks (1850), in dicta, the Court declared: "That an action of ejectment could be maintained on an Indian right to occupancy and use, is not open to question."

The remaining cases involved no indigenous parties. In United States v. Brooks (1850), the Court refused to inquire into allegations of fraud on the part of Commissioner Jehiel Brooks in negotiating a treaty with the Caddo. Following the Marshall Court's precedent, the Taney Court continued to uphold the validity of state land grants issued before the extinguishment of aboriginal title. Depending on the applicable law, the Taney Court held that aboriginal title could sometimes be asserted as a defense in trespass, ejectment, and writ of right actions, even by those with no claim to title themselves.

== United States v. Brooks (1850) ==
In 1835, a treaty negotiated by Commissioner Jehiel Brooks provided for the Caddos to cede certain lands to Franois Grappe and his three sons, Jacques, Dominique, and Balthazar Grappe. The Grappes sold the land to Col. Brooks. On February 24, 1846, the United States attorney for the District of Louisiana filed suit against Col. Brooks, alleging that he had fraudulently included the lands within those ceded by the Caddos to the United States. At trial, the judge refused to allow the federal government to read various documents into evidence; the jury returned a verdict for Brooks.

The Court affirmed, holding that "Brooks being the alienee of the Grappes for the entire reservation, he may hold it against any claim of the United States, as his alienors would have done." The court refused to consider "conjectural intimations, which were made in the argument of it, concerning the influences which were used to secure the reservation, or the designs of the commissioner in having it done."

== The Seneca cases (1857–1858) ==
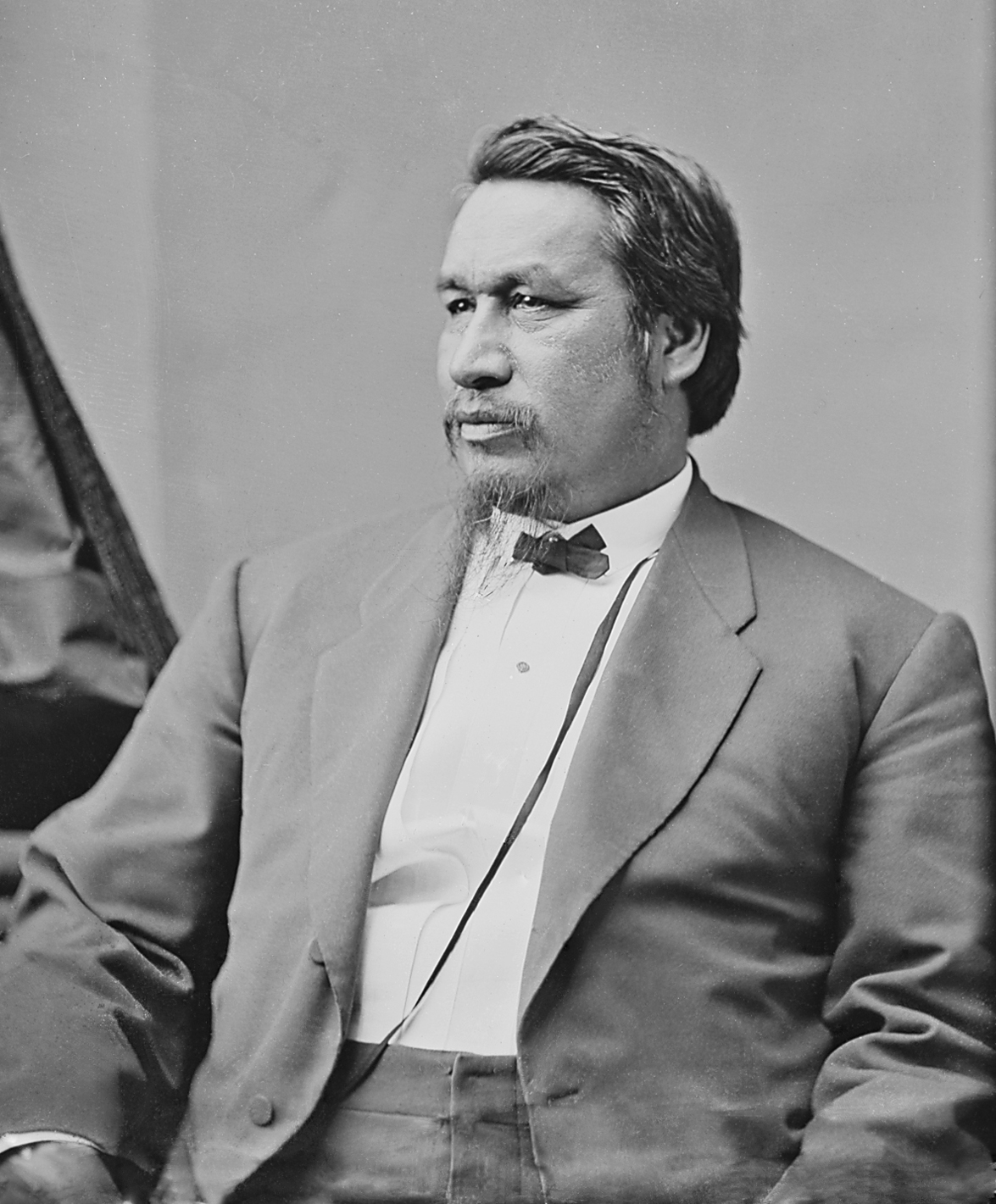
Ely S. Parker, the first indigenous plaintiff to prevail in the U.S. Supreme Court

The two aboriginal title cases involving indigenous litigants to reach the Taney Court both involved the Tonawanda Band of Seneca Indians and the Tonawanda Reservation, both argued by John H. Martindale (first as the district attorney of Genesee County, New York, then in private practice), and both originated in the New York state courts.

=== Fellows v. Blacksmith (1857) ===
Fellows v. Blacksmith (1857) was the first litigation of aboriginal title in the U.S. Supreme Court by an indigenous plaintiff since Cherokee Nation v. Georgia (1831), and the first Supreme Court case won by an indigenous plaintiff. According to a contemporary New York Times article: "The questions involved are of great magnitude, and affect more or less the title to a large portion of the State of New York."

The Court affirmed a judgement for the plaintiff on a cause of action of trespass. Moreover, the Court held that Indian removal treaties could not be enforced by private parties, either through self-help or through the courts. Fellows also underscored the importance of the trust relationship between the federal government and the tribes in holding that the federal government retained the sole discretion to enforce, or not enforce, such treaties against the tribes.

=== New York ex rel. Cutler v. Dibble (1858) ===
New York ex rel. Cutler v. Dibble (1858) was a companion case to Fellows. An individual Seneca party of interest, prevailed in a suit brought under a New York statute authorizing state district attorneys to remove non-Indian trespassers from Indian lands in county courts. At the time Fellows was decided, this case had reached the U.S. Supreme Court but had not yet been argued. The defendant-appellants, before the Court, unsuccessfully challenged the state statute under the Indian Commerce Clause of the United States Constitution, the federal Nonintercourse Act and the Treaty of Buffalo Creek between the federal government and the Senecas. Because the Senecas relied on state law, and the defendants relied on federal law, the case is essentially the inverse of Nonintercourse Act litigation of over the next 150 years.

== Dicta in disputes between non-Indians ==
Several decisions note the extinguishment of aboriginal title as a condition of land grants. More than once, in dicta, the Court cited the purchase of aboriginal title in New Jersey.

=== Sac and Fox Half-Breed Tract cases (1850–1854) ===
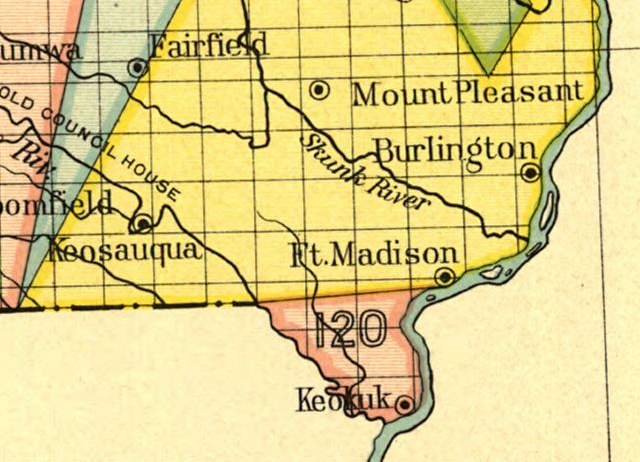
The Sac and Fox Half-Breed Tract at issue (in pink, labelled 120)

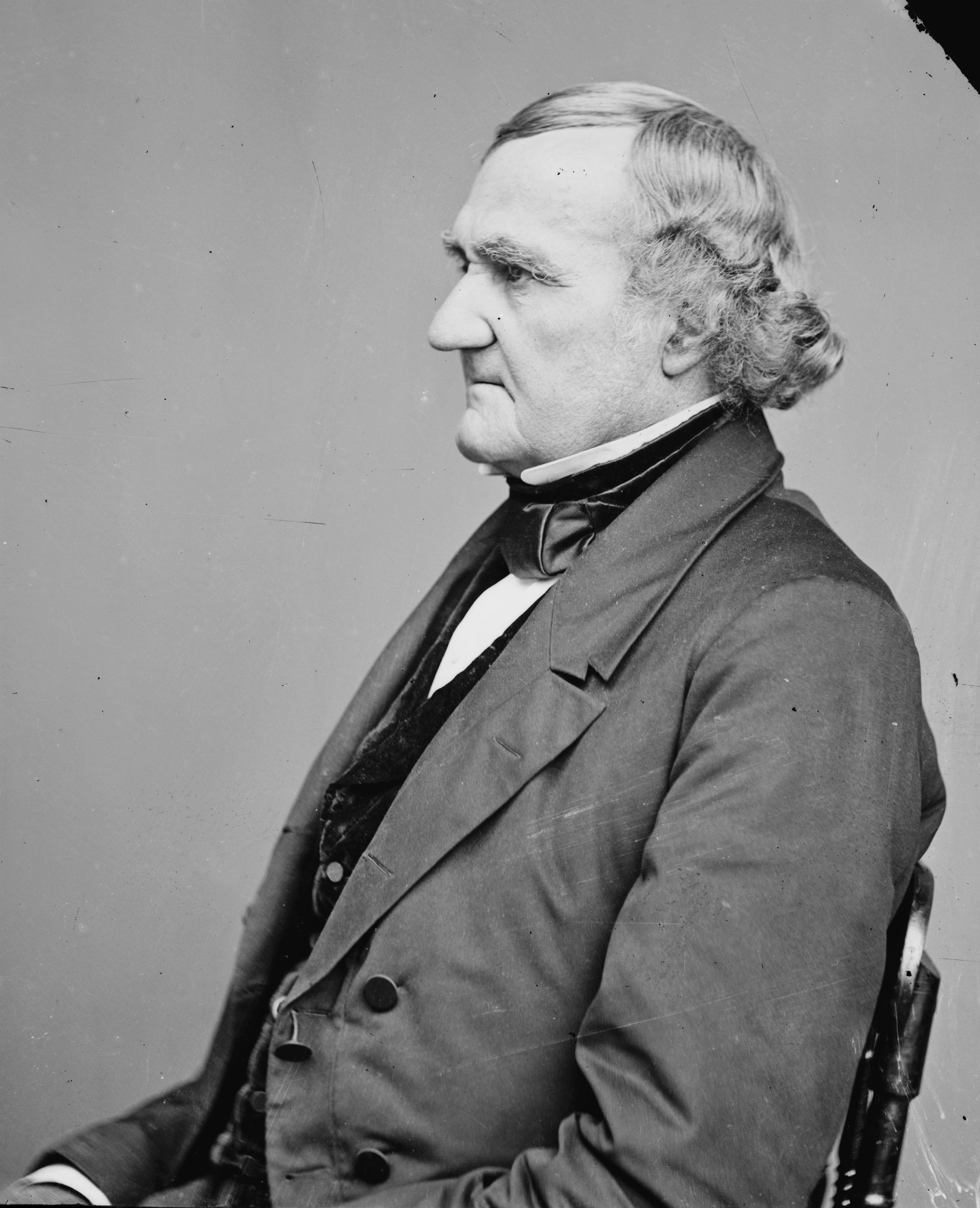
Justice John Catron wrote on opinion on aboriginal title while on the Tennessee Supreme Court of Errors and Appeals and cited it in Marsh v. Brooks.

An 1824 federal treaty with the Sac and Fox tribes set aside a 119,000 acre Half-Breed Tract in Iowa between the Mississippi River and the Des Moines River. The treaty declared the lands inalienable. In 1834, Congress transferred the fee title to the lands to the Half-Breeds, rendering the land transferable. By 1841, the Tract was owned in fee almost entirely by non-Indians. The Taney Court heard for land disputes involving the Iowa Half-Breed Tract: the first two from the Supreme Court of the Iowa Territory; the second two from the United States District Court for the District of Iowa.

Marsh v. Brooks I (1850)

Marsh v. Brooks (1850), a writ of right action, involved a plaintiff holding an 1839 federal land patent (issued under an 1836 statute) and a trespasser defendant asserting that the plaintiff's title was invalid because of the Half-Breed Tract treaty and legislation. The Iowa Supreme Court refused to let the defendants raise this defense; Justice John Catron, for a unanimous Court, reversed and remanded. The Court provided the following dicta on aboriginal title:

This Indian title consisted of the usufruct and right of occupancy and enjoyment; and, so long as it continued, was superior to and excluded those claiming the reserved lands by patents made subsequent to the ratification of the treaty; they could not disturb the occupants under the Indian title. That an action of ejectment could be maintained on an Indian right to occupancy and use, is not open to question. This is the result of the decision in [Johnson v. McIntosh and Cornet v. Winton, written by Justice Catron while he was on the Tennessee high court] . . . .

The Supreme Court held that an ejectment defendant could assert the defense of aboriginal title, even if the defendant did not even claim to hold the aboriginal title:

It was also insisted on the argument here, that, as it did not appear that any half-breeds, or their heirs or assigns, were in existence when the trial below took place, the outstanding title relied on could not be set up by the defendants. To which it may be answered, that it was necessary for the plaintiffs to show themselves to be owners of the land . . . ; and if the land had been previously granted, nothing was left to pass by the second patent . . . . The general rule is, that, where the same land has been twice granted, the elder patent may be set up in defence by a trespasser, when sued by a claimant under the younger grant, without inquiring as to who is the actual owner of the land at the time of the trial.

Webster v. Reid (1850)

In Webster v. Reid (1850), the Court declared unconstitutional an Iowa territorial statute that authorized bench trials against "‘the Owners of the Half-breed Lands lying in Lee County," with notice by publication.

Marsh v. Brooks II (1852)

Marsh v. Brooks (1852) involved the same parties that had been before the Court in 1850. Having re-filed in federal court, the plaintiffs again prevailed, and this time, the Court (again, the opinion authored by Justice Catron) affirmed. In dicta, the Court offered the following interpretation of the status of aboriginal title in the Spanish Louisiana territory:

That the Sacs and Foxes did claim the country generally, where this land lies, is not controverted; nor was their claim ceded to the United States till 1824. And this raises the question whether, according to Spanish usage, whilst that power governed Louisiana, an existing Indian claim to territory precluded inhabitation and cultivation under a permit to inhabit and cultivate a particular place designated in the permit, and which was in the Indian country. Spain had no treaties with any of the Indian tribes in Louisiana, fixing limits to their claims, so far as we are informed. The Indians were kept quiet, and at peace with Spanish subjects, by kind treatment and due precautions, which did not allow obtrusion on lands claimed by them, without written permits from the Governor; but that such permits were usual, cannot be doubted.

Again in dicta, the Court seemed to apply the concept of adverse possession to aboriginal lands:

[The plaintiff's tract] was held and improved by authority of the Spanish government, and claimed as individual property, to which the Indian right of possession did not extend; of this the Indians never complained, nor do they now complain; no half-breed owner and Indian descendant is defending this suit; it is defended by trespassers, showing no color of claim under the half-breeds, or any one else; shelter is sought under the assumption that Honoré's permit and inhabitation were neither known or recognized by the Sacs and Foxes, and that therefore, the additional article of the treaty of 1804, cannot protect the title of Reddick. . . . [I]t must be presumed that the Indians both had knowledge and assented to Honoreé's claim; and we are furthermore of opinion, that the Indian tribes, and the half-breeds, who claim under them, must be held to knowledge, and to consent, that Honoré took and held, rightful possessions, from the fact of his open and notorious actual occupancy, and holding for himself, in their midst.

Coy v. Mason (1854)

Coy v. Mason (1854), another dispute between non-Indians, remarked in dicta that the Half-Breed Tract had been held "by the same title, and in the same manner, that other Indian titles are held."

=== Dred Scott v. Sandford (1857) ===
In dicta, Dred Scott v. Sandford made several comments regarding aboriginal title. Chief Justice Taney was not present at the opinion announcement for Fellows because he was at home working on the Dred Scott opinion, which was announced the next day. Dred Scott, in dicta, opined the following on aboriginal title:

The situation of [blacks] was altogether unlike that of the Indian race. The latter . . . were situated in territories to which the white race claimed the ultimate right of dominion. But that claim was acknowledged to be subject to the right of the Indians to occupy it as long as they thought proper, and neither the English nor colonial Governments claimed or exercised any dominion over the tribe or nation by whom it was occupied, nor claimed the right to the possession of the territory, until the tribe or nation consented to cede it.

Justice John Catron, concurring in Dred Scott, also noted in dicta that:

[B]ecause Congress has express power to regulate commerce among the Indian tribes and to prohibit intercourse with the Indians, that therefore Dr. Emerson's title might be defeated within the country ceded by the Indians to the United States as early as 1805 . . . .

=== State land grants ===
Lattimer's Lessee v. Poteet (1840)

Lattimer's Lessee v. Poteet (1840) was an appeal from a judgment for the defendant in an ejectment action in the United States circuit court of North Carolina. It was undisputed that the plaintiff's title arose from a North Carolina state land grant to Cherokee lands within the boundaries demarcated by the federal Cherokee treaties. The sole defense was that the state grant was void because of the federal Cherokee treaties.

Before the Supreme Court, the plaintiffs argued that it was "not in the power of the United States and the Cherokee nation, by the treaty of Tellico in 1798, to vary in any degree the treaty line of Holston; so as to affect private rights, or the rights of North Carolina." The Court responded that, as a matter of fact, the Tellico treaty had merely confirmed the Holston treaty boundaries, both of which were to be interpreted by the parties to the treaty.

The Court held that, as a matter of federal law, the state grants were not void merely because they were granted before the Cherokee's title was extinguished: "The Indian title being only a right of occupancy, the state of North Carolina had the power to grant the fee in the lands, subject to this right. " But, under the North Carolina surveying statute as interpreted by the North Carolina courts, such grants were invalid. Thus, the Court affirmed.

Chief Justice Taney concurred in the judgment, but disagreed that the political branches had interpreted the Tellico treaty to demarcate the relevant boundary. Justice Catron also concurred. He "admit[ted] . . . that the contracting parties had the power afterwards to settle its position" but argued that "they never saw proper to do [so]." Catron argued that "[t]he land in controversy was granted before this line was run" and thus that the treaty of Holston "will manifestly tend to disturb titles made in reference to another line." Catron concurred only because "the bill of exceptions sets forth not a single fact; and the correctness of the instructions of the Court below cannot therefore be tested by the evidence given on the trial; whether they are right or wrong, it is impossible for me to say"; thus, he defaulted to a "presumption that the instructions were proper."

Justice Wayne dissented without opinion.

Kinney v. Clark (1844)

Kinney v. Clark (1844) involved a Virginia land grant given before the Cherokee aboriginal title to the lands had been extinguished. The Court opined that: "If Clark's entry was made, however, on lands reserved [for the Cherokees] from location by the act of 1779, then it is void, because the act did not open the land office for such purpose, nor extend to the excepted lands." The Court quoted at length from the Long Island treaty (1777) and noted: "This treaty fully explains why the Cherokee country was excepted from the land-law of 1779, and locations on it prohibited; no reasons could add force to its stipulations."

However, the Court determined that: "The opinion of the [Virginia] Court of Appeals in 1791 is conclusive to the point-that if the land in dispute was not Cherokee country, it was not within the exception of the land-law of 1779; and that Clark's title is good, as all the lands in the commonwealth not excepted, were subject to appropriation on Treasury warrants, although claimed by Indians whose lands were not protected from location by statute." Finally, the decision of the United States circuit court of Kentucky was affirmed on the basis of Kentucky's statute of limitations.

=== Spanish Florida and Louisiana ===
Mitchel v. United States (1841)

The plaintiff in Mitchel v. United States (1841) sued the federal government in the Florida state courts, basing his claim on a grant from the Creek and Seminole Indians, ratified by the Spanish during their rule of Florida. The plaintiff's claim was allowed only in part, and he appealed.

Justice Wayne, noted that the case involved the same plaintiff as in Mitchel v. United States (1835), a decision of the Marshall Court. Therefore, Wayne opined, "[t]he case before us does not require any discussion upon the nature and extent of the property held by the Florida Indians in these lands, under Spain. That was satisfactorily done in the decision given by this court in the original case." The Court further noted: "We will not enter into the question, how far the appropriation of the land for a fortress, by order of the government, extinguished the Indian title. It might be done successfully, upon the positions taken by this court in respect to the rights of European monarchs to Indian lands in North America, in Johnson v. McIntosh.

Chouteau v. Molony (1853)

In Chouteau v. Molony (1853), Justice Wayne, for a unanimous Court, interpreted a grant from the Fox tribe to be a mere right to mine lead, rather than a grant of land because it was not confirmed by the Spanish authorities as required by Spanish law and because it included a Fox village which the tribe would have been unlikely to cede.

=== Others ===
Maney v. Porter (1846)

Chief Justice Taney held in Maney v. Porter (1846) that the Court had no jurisdiction to review state court actions claiming money damages from fraudulent land sales where:

[T]he suit was not brought to uphold any title or right which the complainant claimed under the Choctaw treaty, or under the law of Congress which he states to have been passed upon the subject. For he does not ask for a conveyance of the reservations, nor of the Indian title to them. And he does not even aver that these claims are valid, or that he has any title to them; but, on the contrary, charges that none of the claims had been secured, and states that he did not think it probable that they would be obtained by the assignees of the Indians. And as the case has been removed here from the decision of a state court, we have no right to review it unless the complainant claimed some right under the treaty with the Choctaws or the act of Congress . . . . In the case before us, no such title, right, or privilege was claimed by the bill, and of course no decision was made against it in the state court. We therefore can exercise no jurisdiction . . . and are not authorized to examine any questions of fraud or failure of consideration, or breach of contract . . . .

Gaines v. Nicholson (1850)

In Gaines v. Nicholson (1850), Justice Nelson wrote the following in dicta:

There is no doubt but that all persons in whose behalf reservations were made under [an Indian] treaty . . . and had made improvements thereon . . . were entitled to the section, including their improvements, in preference to any other right that could have been previously acquired under the government; because the land embraced within the section was so much excepted from the cession. No previous grant of Congress could be paramount, according to the right of occupancy which this government has always conceded to the Indian tribes within her jurisdiction.
It was so much carved out of the Territory ceded, and remained to the Indian occupant, as he had never parted with it. He holds, strictly speaking, not under the treaty of cession, but under his original title, confirmed by the government in the act of agreeing to the reservation.

Doe v. Wilson (1859)

In Doe v. Wilson (1859), Justice Catron, for the Court, held that a treaty with the Pottawatomie created individual, alienable allotments; thus, the grantee of an individual Pottowatomie had good title.
