= Fellows v. Blacksmith =

- Supreme Court of the United States

Argued January 15–17, 1857 Decided March 5, 1857
- Full case name: Joseph Fellows, Survivor of Robert Kendle v. Susan Blacksmith and Ely S. Parker, Administrators of John Blacksmith, Deceased
- Citations: 60 U.S. 366 (more) 19 How. 366; 15 L. Ed. 684; 1856 U.S. LEXIS 463

Case history
- Prior: Blacksmith v. Fellows, 7 N.Y. (3 Seld.) 401 (1852)

Holding
- (1) Native Americans may sue for trespass despite removal treaty because such treaties are enforceable only by the federal government (2) Enrolled treaties are conclusively valid

Court membership
- Chief Justice Roger B. Taney Associate Justices John McLean · James M. Wayne; John Catron · Peter V. Daniel; Samuel Nelson · Robert C. Grier; Benjamin R. Curtis · John A. Campbell

Case opinion
- Majority: Nelson, joined by unanimous

Laws applied
- Federal common law; Treaty of Buffalo Creek (1838)

Fellows v. Blacksmith, 60 U.S. (19 How.) 366 (1857), is a United States Supreme Court decision involving Native American law. John Blacksmith, a Tonawanda Seneca, sued agents of the Ogden Land Company for common law claims of trespass, assault, and battery after he was forcibly evicted from his sawmill by the Company's agents. The Court affirmed a judgement in Blacksmith's favor, notwithstanding the fact that the Seneca had executed an Indian removal treaty and the Company held the exclusive right to purchase to the land by virtue of an interstate compact ratified by Congress.

Citing the trust relationship between the federal government and the tribes, the Court held that removal treaties could only be enforced against the tribes by the federal government, not private parties (whether through self-help or through the courts). In other words, the federal government retained the discretion not to enforce such treaties. At the same time, the Court held that enrolled treaties are conclusively valid, and refused to consider the plaintiffs claim that the Treaty of Buffalo Creek (1838) was fraudulent.

Fellows was one of several encounters of the Taney Court with the aboriginal title. It was the first litigation of aboriginal title in the United States in the Court by an indigenous plaintiff since Cherokee Nation v. Georgia (1831). According to a contemporary New York Times article: "The questions involved are of great magnitude, and affect more or less the title to a large portion of the State of New York." In Fellows, the court found "its first opportunity to consider the power of the federal government over Indian lands in New York." Following the precedents of the Marshall Court, Fellows was "decided at a time when the government was still dealing with Indian tribes as if they were semi-sovereign nations."

The plaintiffs' lawyer John H. Martindale (future New York Attorney General) also represented the interests of the Tonawanda Band of Seneca Indians in three companion cases in the New York state courts. The third such case, New York ex rel. Cutler v. Dibble (1858), also reached the Supreme Court, which held that state nonintercourse acts (U.S. state laws prohibiting non-Indians from acquiring Indian lands) are not preempted by the Commerce Clause, the federal Nonintercourse Act, or federal treaties. Ely S. Parker, one of the administrators of the Blacksmith estate, went on to draft the surrender at Appomattox and to become the first indigenous Commissioner of Indian Affairs.

== Background ==
=== Precedent ===
The Marshall Court (1801—1835) had repeatedly taken up the issue of aboriginal title in the United States. However, with the exception of Cherokee Nation v. Georgia (1831), which was dismissed for lack of original jurisdiction, all the disputes had been between non-Indians—typically between those who derived their title from the government and those who derived their title from private purchases from Indians. The uniform rule of these cases, enunciated most clearly in Johnson v. McIntosh (1823), was that non-Indians could not acquire valid land title from such private purchases. However, the purchase at issue in Fellows, the Treaty of Buffalo Creek (1838), had been ratified by the federal government.

The Court had not yet encountered a party claiming to actually possess aboriginal title in a case in which it had jurisdiction, so it had not yet definitively resolved the question of whether the holders of aboriginal title could avail themselves of the common law causes of action of trespass or ejectment. At the end of his opinion in Fletcher v. Peck (1810), Marshall had stated that ejectment could not be obtained against the holder of aboriginal title. The Taney Court (1836—1864), in Marsh v. Brooks (1850), went further in declaring that the holder of aboriginal title could obtain ejectment, stating: "That an action of ejectment could be maintained on an Indian right to occupancy and use, is not open to question." In the oral arguments of that case, Cherokee Nation had been cited as authority for the argument that "Indians cannot sue on their aboriginal title in court of the United States." The plaintiffs in Fellows had sued under the related cause of action of trespass.

An 1821 opinion of U.S. Attorney General William Wirt, interpreting Fletcher and Johnson, argued that: "The Seneca Indians must be protected in the enjoyment of exclusive possession of their lands, as defined and bounded in the Treaty of Canandaigua, until they have voluntarily relinquished it."

=== Dispute ===
A map showing the Phelps and Gorham Purchase

Both the sovereignty over and land title to modern-day western New York was disputed between the colonies, and then states, of New York and Massachusetts, both claiming the lands by virtue of their colonial charters. This dispute was resolved on December 16, 1786 by the Treaty of Hartford, an interstate compact providing that the lands would be part of the territory of New York, but Massachusetts would retain the pre-emption rights, the exclusive right to purchase the Indian lands. The compact was approved by the Congress of the Confederation on October 8, 1787.

Oliver Phelps and Nathaniel Gorham acquired the right of pre-emption to the lands at issue in Fellows v. Blacksmith from Massachusetts in 1788 as part of the Phelps and Gorham Purchase. However, Phelps and Gorham only consummated the right of pre-emption for a tract east of the Genesee River in 1788. Phelps and Gorham defaulted on their payments to Massachusetts in 1790, causing the pre-emption rights to return to the state. Massachusetts then conveyed the pre-emption rights to Samuel Ogden on behalf of Robert Morris on May 12, 1791. Morris retained the pre-emptive right to the Morris Reserve for himself, but sold the pre-emptive right to the lands in question to the Holland Land Company on July 20, 1793 (the Holland Purchase).

The Holland Land Company consummated much of its pre-emptive right in the Treaty of Big Tree (1797), extinguishing all Seneca aboriginal title west of the Genesee River except in ten reservations. The dispute concerned one of those reservations. The Treaty of Buffalo Creek (1838) had provided for the relocation of the Seneca people from New York to present-day Kansas, with the exception of four reservations: the Buffalo Creek Reservation, the Cattaraugus Reservation, the Allegany Reservation, and the Tonawanda Reservation. However, the Seneca refused to be relocated. Another treaty with the Senecas from 1842 modified the prior treaty: the Senecas were to keep Cattaraugus and Allegany, but still cede Buffalo Creek and Tonawanda. The Seneca Nation of New York was established in 1848. The Tonawanda Band of Seneca Indians seceded from the Seneca Nation and achieved independent federal recognition (after the decision) in 1857.

=== Prior history ===
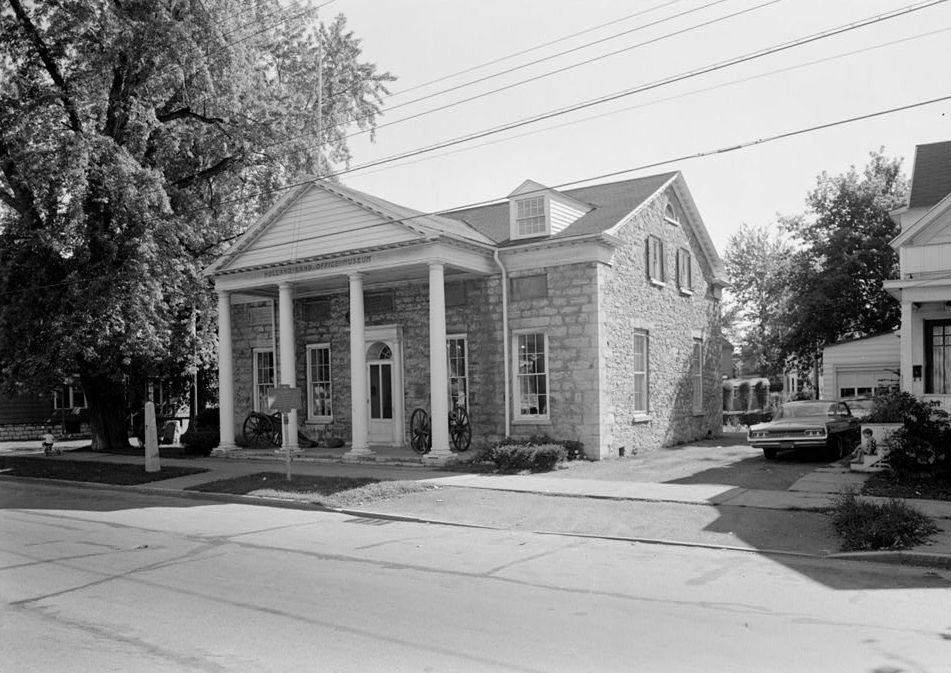
The Holland Land Office

Facts

John Blacksmith was a member of the Tonawanda Band of Seneca Indians and the sachem of the Wolf Clan. Blacksmith had constructed an "Indian sawmill and yard" on his enclosed tract within the Tonawanda Reservation in Pembroke, Genesee County, New York circa 1826. Blacksmith had not received compensation for the value of his improvements (the sawmill and yard), as provided for by the 1838 and 1842 treaties, because he forcibly refused to let the treaty arbitrators onto his property for the survey. The Ogden Land Company claimed title to the Tonawanda Reservation by virtue of its right of pre-emption, consummated by the treaties. Agents of the company "expelled and dispossessed" Blacksmith "with force of arms."

Supreme Court (trial court)

The suit was originally brought by John Blacksmith in 1846. Represented by lawyer John H. Martindale, Blacksmith sued Joseph Fellows and Robert Kendle, agents of the Land Company, for the torts of assault and battery and trespass, quare clausum fregit, with the sawmill as the locus in quo. Blacksmith's wife and Ely S. Parker (Blacksmith's successor as sachem of the Wolf Clan), together the administrators of Blacksmith's estate, succeeded Blacksmith as plaintiffs.

After a jury trial, the New York Supreme Court held for Blacksmith.

Supreme Court, General Term

The New York Supreme Court General Term ("circuit court") denied a new trial, holding that the payment of the appraisal value of the improvements determined by the arbitrator was a condition precedent to the conveyance in the treaty.

Court of Appeals

Before the New York Court of Appeals, Fellows was represented by J. C. Spencer, who made three arguments. First, he argued that the right to bring an action for trespass based on aboriginal title accrued only to an Indian nation, not an individual Indian. As Spencer noted, the Seneca Nation itself was prohibited by law from bringing an action "by a private attorney." Second, he argued that Fellows' title was valid. Third, he argued that the Seneca's rights under the treaty were only enforceable against the federal government, and did not affect the defendant's title as a condition precedent. The court reporter did not publish Martindale's responses.

The Court of Appeals, 6-1, sided with Blacksmith. Judge John Worth Edmonds delivered the majority opinion, joined by Chief Judge Charles H. Ruggles and Judges Addison Gardiner, Freeborn G. Jewett, Alexander S. Johnson, and Watson. Judge Welles dissented and Judge Gridley was absent.

The Court of Appeals held that Blacksmith could independently bring the claim for trespass, for which he need only show a right to possession. The Court of Appeals also held that Fellows' title was invalid, because the payment of compensation was a condition precedent. Welles, in dissent, agreed that Blacksmith could individually sue for trespass, but disagreed that the appraisal was a condition precedent; he would have reversed and granted a new trial, with costs. The Court of Appeals remanded back to the Supreme Court, after which a writ of error was granted by the U.S. Supreme Court.

U.S. Supreme Court oral argument

John H. Martindale argued the case for the Tonawanda Senecas before the Court. Commissioner R.H. Gillet and J.L. Brown of the Ogden Land Company argued for the defendants. Arguments started on January 15, 1857 and were adjourned until January 17.

One of the plaintiffs, Ely S. Parker personally attended the oral arguments before the U.S. Supreme Court in Washington, D.C. According to the New York Times:

All who heard their cases argued before the Supreme Court of the United States, a few months since, will recollect seeing this same Indian, and that he was well posted on the points he desired his counsel to press upon the attention of the Court.

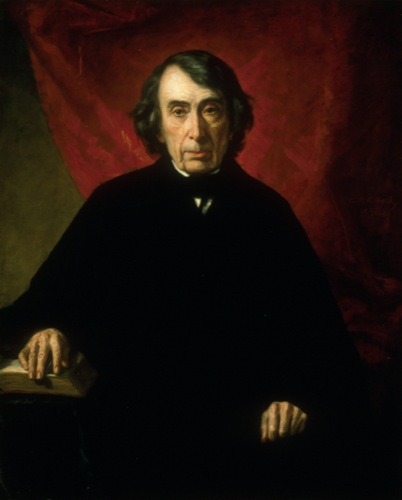
Chief Justice Taney skipped the opinion announcement to work on Dred Scott v. Sandford, announced the next day.

A letter to the editor of the New York Times—which criticizes a previous article for creating the "impression that the Indians at Tonawanda are very nearly the equal in agriculture, general intelligence, and in the customs of civilized life, of their white neighbors"—concurs with this assessment of Parker's role:

I have not a word to say in the disparagement of the intellectual ability of Ely S. Parker, their head chief, and cheerfully unite with "W.H.P." in awarding him the credit for making valuable suggestions to his counsel on the argument of the case in the Supreme Court of the United States[.] Indeed, I am inclined to the belief, that to him is due the credit of originating and suggesting to his counsel the only available point in the case, and the one on which it was there decided, for the case had been ten years in the Courts of this State, and this point was never before made, nor was it made in the Supreme Court of the United States, in the original brief of counsel for the Indians, filed pursuant to the rules of the Court. It was first made in a supplementary brief printed after the opening argument of counsel on the other side had been commenced, and not handed in until the second day, just previous to its conclusion.

Opinion announcement

Chief Justice Roger Taney was not present at the opinion announcement for Fellows because he was at home working on the opinion in Dred Scott v. Sandford, which was announced the next day. The Taney court had inherited from the preceding Marshall Court voluminous decisions on the status of aboriginal title in the United States. None of those decisions was cited in either opinion. Dred Scott, in dicta, opined the following on aboriginal title:

The situation of [blacks] was altogether unlike that of the Indian race. The latter . . . were situated in territories to which the white race claimed the ultimate right of dominion. But that claim was acknowledged to be subject to the right of the Indians to occupy it as long as they thought proper, and neither the English nor colonial Governments claimed or exercised any dominion over the tribe or nation by whom it was occupied, nor claimed the right to the possession of the territory, until the tribe or nation consented to cede it.

Justice John Catron, concurring in Dred Scott, also noted in dicta that:

[B]ecause Congress has express power to regulate commerce among the Indian tribes and to prohibit intercourse with the Indians, that therefore Dr. Emerson's title might be defeated within the country ceded by the Indians to the United States as early as 1805 . . . .

== Opinion of the Court ==
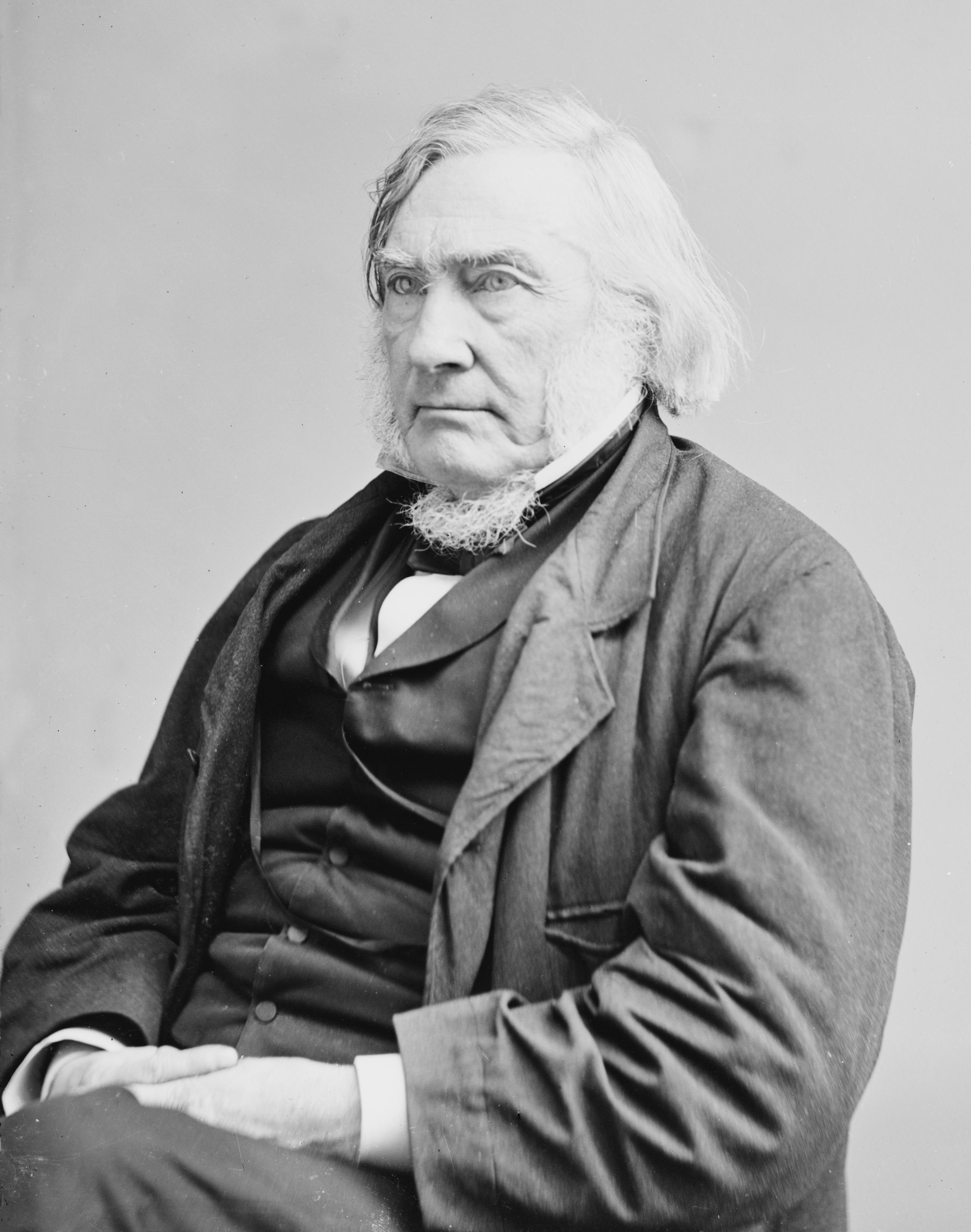
Justice Samuel Nelson delivered the opinion of the Court.

Justice Samuel Nelson delivered the unanimous opinion of the Court, affirming the judgment of the New York Court of Appeals.

Effect of the Treaty

The Court observed:

Neither treaty made any provision as to the mode or manner in which the removal of the Indians or surrender of the reservations was to take place. The grantees have assumed that they were authorized to take forcible possession of the two reservations, or of the four, as the case would have been under the first treaty. The plaintiff in this case was expelled by force; and unless this mode of removal can be sustained, the recovery against the defendants for the trespass was right, and must be affirmed.

The Court noted that previous removals of Indians had been undertaken by the federal government "according to the usage and practice of the Government, by its authority and under its care and superintendence." "[A]ny other mode of a forcible removal," the Court argued, would not "be consistent with the peace of the country, or with the duty of the Government to these dependent people, who have been influenced by its counsel and authority to change their habitations."

Because the treaty had been negotiated "with them as a quasi nation, possessing some of the attributes of an independent people, and to be dealt with accordingly," the Court held that "unless otherwise expressly stipulated" only the federal government had the "authority or power" to execute the agreement. The Court remarked that the Senecas were "in a state of pupilage, and hold the relation to the Government as a ward to his guardian." The nature of that relationship between the Seneca and the federal government was incompatible with the Seneca being expelled by "irregular force and violence," or even "through the intervention of the courts of justice." Thus, the court held that the private beneficiaries of Native American treaties could neither expel tribes by force or by a cause of action for ejectment. The court observed that "this interpretation is in accordance with the usages and practice of the Government in providing for the removal of Indian tribes from their ancient possessions, with the fitness and propriety of the thing itself," and with the text of the treaty.

The Court concluded: "We hold that the performance was not a duty that belonged to the grantees, but for the Government under the treaty."

Validity of the Treaty

The Court did not accept the plaintiffs' arguments that the treaty was invalid because it was not signed by tribal leaders with the authority to cede the relevant lands or because the signatories were fraudulently induced to sign. Analogizing to the enrolled bill rule (the only citation of case law in the opinion), the Court held that "the treaty, after executed and ratified by the proper authorities of the Government, becomes the supreme law of the land, and the courts can no more go behind it for the purpose of annulling its effect and operation."

Conditions Precedent

Because its aforementioned holdings required affirmance, the Court did not reach the alternate ground for decision of the trial court that the appraisal and the payments were conditions precedent.

== Companion cases ==
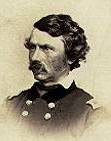
The Seneca's lawyer John H. Martindale, brought four suits against the Land Company and its grantees.

Lawyer John H. Martindale, of Verplank & Martindale, also represented Tonawanda Seneca plaintiffs in three other contemporary suits against the Land Company and its grantees: People ex rel. Blacksmith v. Tracy (N.Y. Sup. 1845); People ex rel. Waldron v. Soper (N.Y. 1852); and New York ex rel. Cutler v. Dibble (U.S. 1858). (Note: These suits are designated ex rel because they are brought in the name of the People of New York, on behalf of the party in interest.) (Note: According to the New York Times, John H. Martindale was the "principal attorney" for the Senecas, having "for the last fifteen years devoted his best powers, in the meridian of life, to defending them, in the numerous suits brought against them, and also to protecting their interest from the aggressions of settlements under the Ogden titles. In all the cases he has been uniformly successful in all the Courts of this State, and in the Supreme Court of the United States." A letter to the editor disagreed, stating: "There have been no suits brought against them. There have been in all only four suits, involving in various forms the relative rights of the Indians and the Ogden Company and its grantees, which have gone through the Courts of this State.) At the time, Martindale (the future New York Attorney General) was well known for litigating personal injury torts against railroads, especially New York Central Railroad.

Whereas Fellows was brought in the New York Supreme Court under the common law cause of action of trespass, these three suits were brought (as required by statute) in the Genesee County Court under a state statute prohibiting non-Indians from residing on Indian lands. That statute provided:

[I]t shall be unlawful for any person or persons, other than Indians, to settle or reside upon any lands belonging to or occupied by any nation or tribe of Indians within this state; and that all leases, contracts and agreements made by any Indians, whereby any person or persons, other than Indians, shall be permitted to reside upon such lands, shall be absolutely void; and if any person or persons shall settle or reside on any such lands, contrary to this act, it shall be the duty of any judge of any court of Common Pleas of the county within which such lands shall be situated, on complaint made to him, and on due proof of the fact of such settlement or residence, to issue his warrant, under his hand and seal, directed to the sheriff of such county, commanding him, within ten days after the receipt thereof, to remove such person or persons so settling or residing, with his, her or their families, from such lands.

The statute further provided:

that it shall be the duty of the district attorneys respectively of the several counties in this state in which any lands belonging to any Indian tribe shall be situated, (among other things) to make complaint of all intrusions upon Indian lands, forbidden by the act; and from time to time to make inquiries whether any persons other than Indians are settled upon such lands, and to cause them to be removed in the manner therein prescribed.

From 1821–1846, the district attorney would have been appointed; thereafter, the office was elected. Martindale was the district attorney of Genesee County from 1842–1844 and again from 1847–1849. Thus, Martindale himself filed the complaints in People ex rel. Blacksmith v. Tracy and People ex rel. Waldron v. Soper, and his successor, Seth Wakeman (1850–1855) filed the complaint in New York ex rel. Cutler v. Dibble. Although Martindale was district attorney when the complaint in Tracy was filed, he lost the election and attempted to litigate the mandamus issue as a private attorney.

The results of the three suits were mixed. Martindale was defeated in the New York Supreme Court and New York Court of Appeals, respectively, in the first two, but had prevailed in the Court of Appeals and, ultimately, the U.S. Supreme Court in the third.

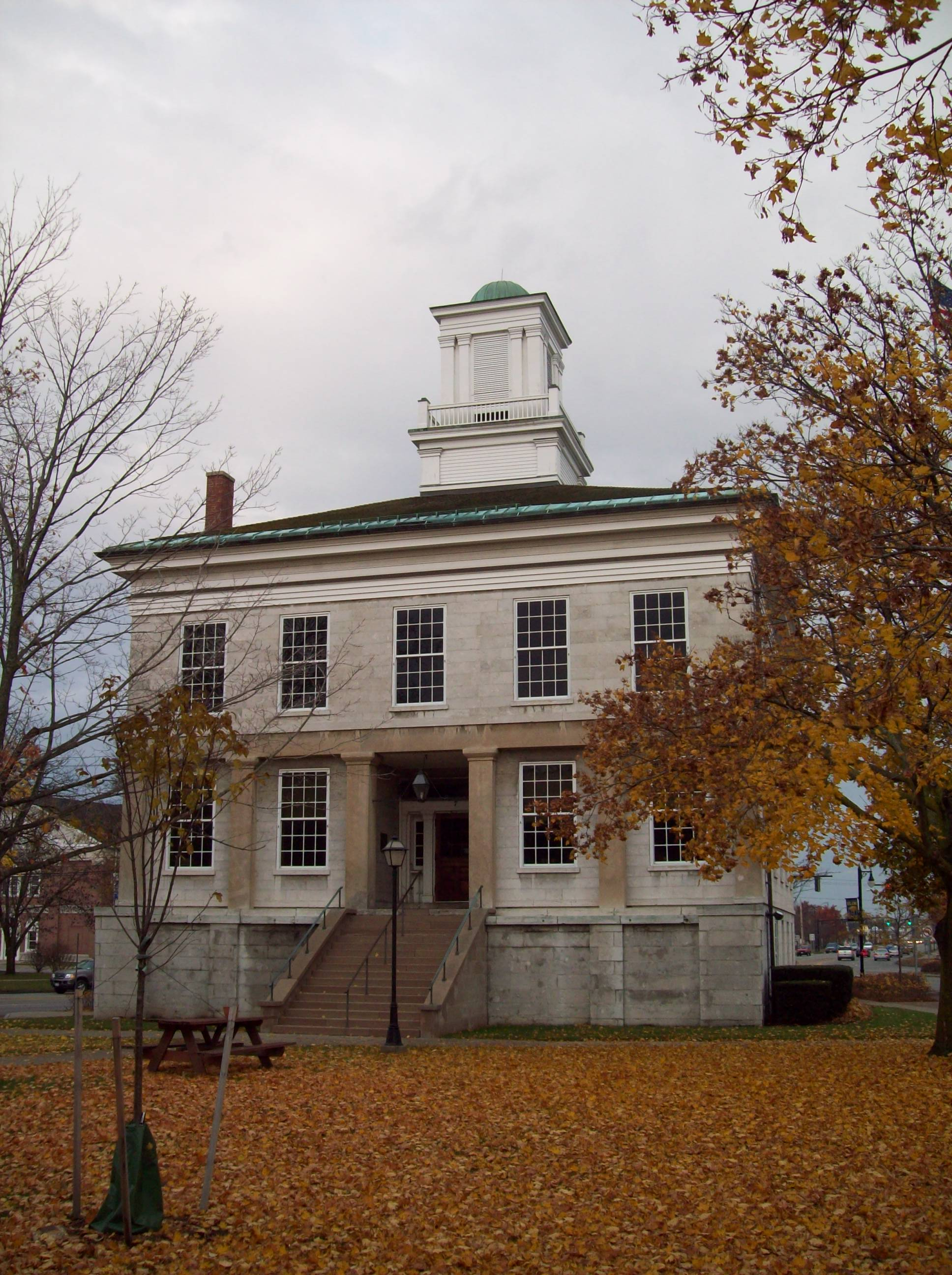
The Genesee County Courthouse, a structure built by the Holland Land Company

=== People ex rel. Blacksmith v. Tracy ===
Martindale (in his final days as district attorney) filed the complaint on January 8, 1845. Evidence, including the testimony of Ely S. Parker, was presented on January 11. Judge Phineas L. Tracy, of the Genesee County Court (1841–1845), declined to issue a warrant to the Genesee County Sheriff to remove the Ogden grantees.

Still in January, Martindale applied to the Supreme Court for mandamus, and the court issued an alternative mandamus (essentially, an order to show cause why peremptory mandamus should not issue) on March 6, 1845, which was served March 25. On April 19, the deadline was extended to the first Tuesday in June. Before the Supreme Court, Martindale was joined by New York Attorney General John Van Buren and opposed by A. Taber and J. L. Brown.

That June, Judge Jewett granted Tracy's motion to quash, without costs. The court held that only the district attorney could bring such an action to enforce the statute:

I am of opinion that by the terms and spirit of the statute under which this proceeding has been had, no other than the district attorney of the county of Genesee (in which the lands intruded upon are situated) could regularly be a relator. The remedy for the act complained of is provided by the statute, as well as the officers to carry it into execution. It is made the duty of the district attorney to make complaint of all intrusions upon Indian lands forbidden by the act, and from time to time to make inquiries whether any persons other than Indians are settled upon such lands, and to cause them to be removed in the manner therein prescribed. Without the act, John Blacksmith or any other person could not claim such summary proceedings to remove intruders upon Indian lands; and with the act, no other person is authorized by its provisions to make complaint of such intrusions, or to cause the intruders to be removed, but the district attorney of the county in which the lands are situated.

The court also found the affidavit of Parker to be insufficient as a factual matter to comply with the terms of the statute. However, even if the district attorney had brought the action and the affidavit had been sufficient, the Supreme Court still would have denied mandamus as a matter of law.

=== People ex rel. Waldron v. Soper ===
In the second suit, Martindale—in a second term, this time as an elected district attorney—filed the complaint under the same statute on January 3, 1849. Judge Horace U. Soper, of the Genesee County Court (1847–1850), granted the writ of removal on January 9, 1849. The New York Supreme Court General Term (Judges Mullet, Sill, and Marvin), sitting in Buffalo, New York, granted a writ of certiorari, (Note: Without mandamus, decisions of the County Court could only be appealed to the New York Supreme Court (trial court) by "common law certiorari." With both methods, the decisions are reported as if the County Court Judge was a party adverse to the non-prevailing party.) and affirmed in March 1849. "Waldron" is the only party subject to the writ of removal named in the Court of Appeals opinion (the only reported opinion) and only by last name.

The Court of Appeals reversed and annulled the writ in October 1852. Judge John Worth Edmonds, for a unanimous court, gave two reasons. First, it held that the court had no power to proceed against the majority of the defendants because they were not properly summoned and caused to appear. Second, with respect to defendant Waldron (who had voluntarily appeared), the court held that "it does not appear that these lands were owned by the Indians."

=== New York ex rel. Cutler v. Dibble ===
In a third suit, Martindale's successor as district attorney, Seth Wakeman (1845–1850), filed a complaint against Asa Cutler, John Underhill, and Arza Underhill (grantees of the Land Company) under the same statute, on February 19, 1853. Thomas Black, a Seneca who had made some improvements and apparently been compensated for the same, allegedly consented to the Underhills presence. Judge Edgar C. Dibble, of the Genesee County Court (1846, 1851–1854) and a one-time partner of Martindale, granted the writ of removal. The Supreme Court granted certiorari and affirmed on September 4, 1854, holding that "the Seneca nation had not duly granted and conveyed the reserve in question to Ogden and Fellows." The judgement of the Supreme Court was delivered by Judge Marvin, joined by judges Bowen and Green. Judge Mullet dissented without opinion.

The Court of Appeals—after the second argument—also affirmed in September 1857. The majority opinion was authored by Judge Brown, joined by Judges Comstock, Paige, Shankland, and Bowen. The Court of Appeals held that the state statute did not violate the New York Constitution and that a jury trial was not required because the defendants had no property right. In closing, the Court of Appeals cited the U.S. Supreme Court's recent decision in Fellows. Chief Judge Hiram Denio, joined by Judge Alexander S. Johnson, concurred on the constitutionality of the 1821 state statute, but dissented on the grounds that the treaties extinguished the aboriginal title, and thus the state statute either did not apply or violated the treaty. Judge Selden recused.

By the time Fellows was decided, Dibble had reached the U.S. Supreme Court but had not yet been argued. The Court eventually affirmed in 1858, holding that the state statute did not violate the Indian Commerce Clause, the federal Nonintercourse Act, or the treaty.

== Subsequent developments ==
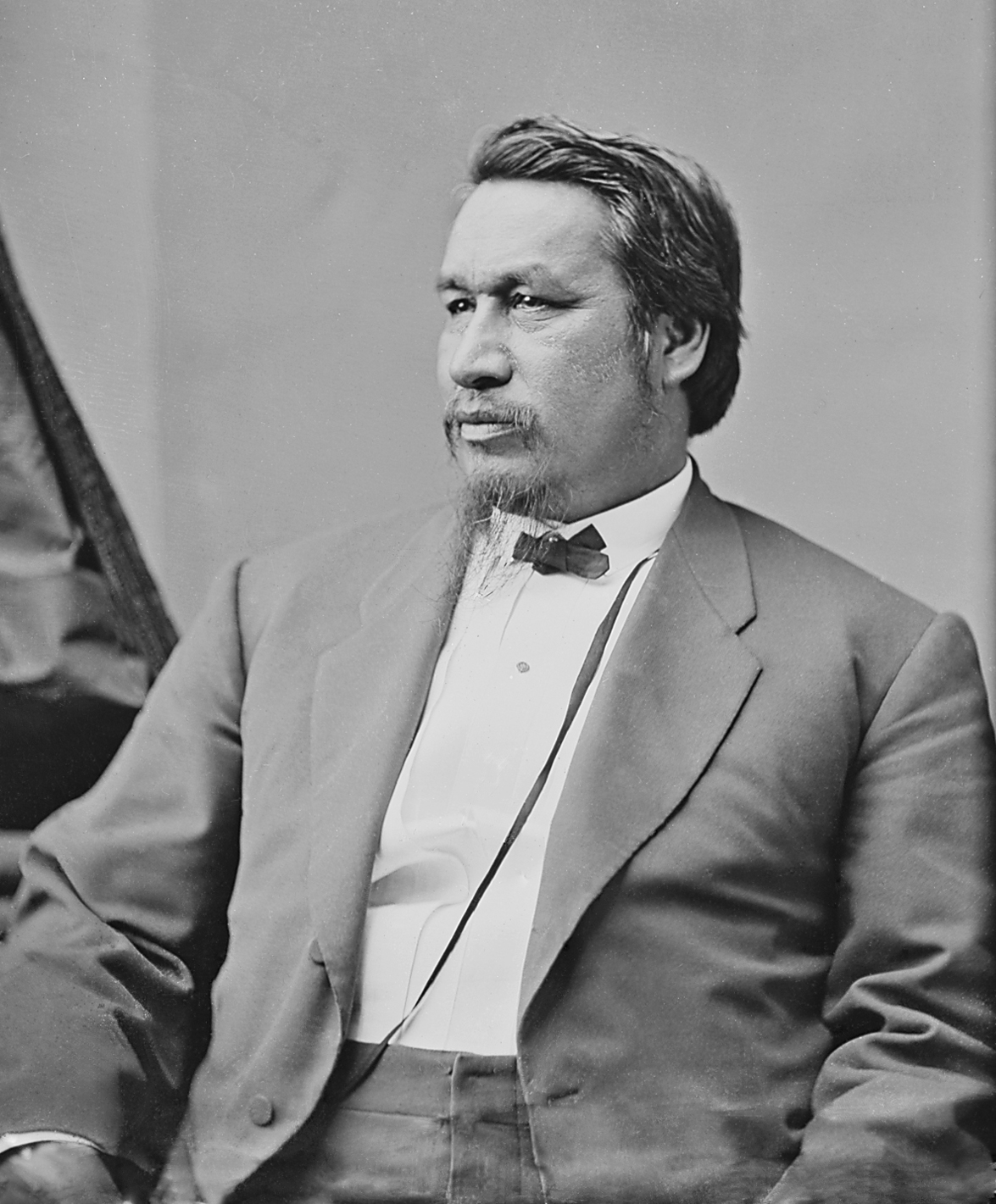
Ely S. Parker, one of the plaintiffs

=== Enrolled treaty doctrine ===
The key claim advanced by lawyer John H. Martindale in all four cases had been that the Treaty of Buffalo Creek (1838) was invalid because it was not signed by the Seneca leaders with the authority to cede the Tonawanda Reservation, and the signatures it did contain were obtained by coercion or fraud. This argument had not prevailed before the New York Courts or the Supreme Court. As Brown notes:

The principal point, however, on which the counsel relied, and which he hoped to establish, was that the Tonawandas were not bound by the Treaties, because the chiefs there protested against and refused to sign them. To this point his main argument has always, in all stages of the litigation been addressed, and he has pressed it upon the consideration of the Courts, with the utmost pertinacity. It was, however, decided against him in the Blacksmith case, argued last Winter at Washington and has never been decided in his favor by any Court.

Fellows is among the earliest cases where the Supreme Court applied treaties, including treaties between the United States and Native American tribes, as binding law. Fellows has been cited as authority for the enrolled treaty doctrine; analogous to the enrolled bill rule for statutes, the enrolled treaty doctrine prevents inquiry into the legitimacy of the formation of treaties once ratified by the Senate. This doctrine was later used to deny relief (or, to deny more relief) to Native American tribes who claimed that treaties were entered into fraudulently or signed by persons without authority to bind the tribe. Fellows was also decided before the Supreme Court began distinguishing between self-executing and non-self executing treaties. Regardless, treaties between the United States and Native Americans continued to be regarded as self-executing.

=== Seneca land claims ===
A contemporary New York Times article opined that: "The questions involved are of great magnitude, and affect more or less the title to a large portion of the State of New York." Although the Seneca prevailed in the lawsuit, title to a large portion of the state was not called into question due to the court's refusal to entertain the Seneca's claims regarding the invalidity of the treaty. According to Armstrong, the result of the decision was mixed:

The decision was not all that the Indians had hoped for—it was a victory on narrow legal grounds rather than a vindication of their cause—but it was a victory. The Court's ruling meant that as long as the federal government was determined to take no action to remove them from Tonawanda, the Ogden Company was powerless to do so.

Fellows was "decided at a time when the government was still dealing with Indian tribes as if they were semi-sovereign nations." The Tonawanda Seneca were never relocated to Kansas, and a new 1857 treaty confirmed their title to a 7,549-acre reservation. This treaty ended 15 years of litigation between the Tonawanda Band and the Ogden Land Company.

The Seneca, again represented by Martindale, prevailed in New York ex rel. Cutler v. Dibble (1858). Seneca Nation of Indians v. Christy (1896) also involved a Seneca plaintiff represented by a Civil War general. There, the plaintiffs challenged the Phelps and Gorham Purchase under the Nonintercourse Act. Fellows was not cited. In 1899, the U.S. Supreme Court upheld a $1,967,056 judgment of the Court of Claims (pursuant to an enabling statute) against the federal government based on the 1838 treaty. Fellows was cited by Oneida Indian Nation of New York v. County of Oneida (1974) for the proposition that "the possessory right claimed is a federal right to the lands at issue in this case."

=== Litigants ===
Plaintiff Ely S. Parker went on to become a member of General Ulysses S. Grant's staff during the American Civil War, drawing up the terms of the surrender at Appomattox Court House. After the war, President Grant appointed Parker as Commissioner of Indian Affairs, the first indigenous head of the Bureau of Indian Affairs. According to his New York Times obituary, Parker "negotiated the removal of his tribe from this State to the fertile and pleasant lands on Green Bay, Wisconsin."

The Seneca's lawyer, John H. Martindale, later appeared before the U.S. Supreme Court, as New York Attorney General, in In re New York Indians (1866), arguing that the state had the right to tax the Senecas. The Court disagreed. In the case below, plaintiffs Joseph Fellows (the defendant in Fellows), Louisa Troup, and George R. Babcock sought to recover a plot of land from Robert Denniston (in his official capacity as New York State Comptroller) and Thomas W. Olcott, the purchaser at the tax foreclosure sale. Fellows, Troup, and Babcock argued that the state had no power to tax the Seneca. In re New York Indians, agreeing, cited Fellows:

Until the Indians have sold their lands, and removed from them in pursuance of the treaty stipulations, they are to be regarded as still in their ancient possession, and are in under their original rights, and entitled to the undisturbed enjoyment of them. This was the effect of the decision in the case of Fellows v. Blacksmith. The time for the surrender of the possession, according to their consent given in the treaty, had not expired when these taxes were levied. The period within which the removal was to take place, under the treaty of 1838, was five years from the time it went into effect. It was not proclaimed till 1840, and under that of 1842 the time did not expire till 1846. The taxation of the lands was premature and illegal.
