= Tassel (surname) =

Tassel is a French surname. Notable people with the surname include:

- Emile Tassel, original owner of Hôtel Tassel
- George "Corn" Tassel
- Richard Tassel (1582–1660), French painter

== See also ==
- Van Tassel
- Tassell
