= Aboriginal title in the Marshall Court =

Court era recognizing Native American tribal rights

Chief Justice John Marshall composed several early and influential opinions on aboriginal title in the United States.

The Marshall Court (1801–1835) issued some of the earliest and most influential opinions by the Supreme Court of the United States on the status of aboriginal title in the United States, several of them written by Chief Justice John Marshall himself. However, without exception, the remarks of the Court on aboriginal title during this period are dicta. Only one indigenous litigant ever appeared before the Marshall Court, and there, Marshall dismissed the case for lack of original jurisdiction.

Fletcher v. Peck (1810) and Johnson v. McIntosh (1823), the first and the most detailed explorations of the subject by Marshall, respectively, both arose out of collusive lawsuits, where land speculators presented an artificial case and controversy in order to elicit the desired precedent. In Cherokee Nation v. Georgia (1831) and Worcester v. Georgia (1832), the dicta of Marshall and the dissenting justices embraced a far broader view of aboriginal title.

Johnson involved a pre-Revolutionary private conveyances from 1773 and 1775; Mitchell v. United States (1835) involved 1804 and 1806 conveyances in Florida under Spanish rule. However, in both cases, the Marshall Court continued to apply the rule that aboriginal title was inalienable, except to The Crown. This inalienability principle—whether embodied by the Royal Proclamation of 1763, the Confederation Congress Proclamation of 1783, the Nonintercourse Acts of 1790, 1793, 1796, 1799, 1802, or 1833, or the federal common law—remains the crux of the modern Indian land claim litigation.

Several other cases involved disputes between non-Indians holding land grants from different states or state nonintercourse acts; federal courts had subject-matter jurisdiction over such disputes as "Controversies . . . between Citizens of the same State claiming Lands under Grants of different States." For example, Preston v. Browder (1816), Danforth's Lessee v. Thomas (1816), and Danforth v. Wear (1824) involved conflicting land grants from the states of North Carolina and Tennessee.

== Background ==
=== Earlier Supreme Court decisions ===
Sims' Lessee v. Irvine (1799) was the first Supreme Court decision to discuss aboriginal title (albeit briefly), and the only such decision before the Marshall Court. The Court found ejectment jurisdiction over certain lands, notwithstanding the defendant's claim (in the alternative to the claim that the defendant himself held title) that the lands were still held in aboriginal title because:

Without confessing the aboriginal title of the Indian tribes, it is enough for the lessor of the Plaintiff to allege . . . that before the year 1779, they had abandoned and relinquished all the lands . . . and that in pursuance of treaties, they have since receded very distantly from that boundary. Lands may be acquired by conquest; and a relinquishment, in consequence of hostilities, is tantamount to conquest.

=== State court decisions ===
The "first known American case to address the issue" of the validity of state land grands to land over which the aboriginal title had not been extinguished was Marshall v. Clark (Va. 1791), decided by the Virginia Supreme Court. The plaintiff was John Marshall's father, Thomas Marshall, challenging (on behalf of the state militia's claim to the same land) the validity of a land grant to Revolutionary War veteran George Rogers Clark. Marshall argued that the grant could not be valid because the aboriginal title was not extinguished; the Virginia Supreme Court disagreed:

The Indian title did not impede . . . the power of the legislature to grant the land. [The grantee] must risque the event of the Indian claim, and yield to it, if finally established, or have the benefit of a former or future extinction thereof.

The Pennsylvania Supreme Court and Tennessee Supreme Court soon issued opinions to the same effect, holding that states could grant land that the federal government had not yet purchased from Indians. Such transactions, already common, increased in the wake of these decisions; the assumption was that the Indians held fee simple to their land, but that future executory interests could be sold, representing a promise of the state to transfer the land should it ever come into their possession.

A second, competing view was that the Indians possessed only a possessory right of occupancy, not fee simple to their land. "The first reported American court decision holding that unsold Indian land was owned by the government, subject only to the lesser right of 'possession' or 'occupancy' held by Indians" was Strother v. Cathey (N.C. 1807), decided by the North Carolina Supreme Court. There, the North Carolina court decided that the fee title to the land was held by the state, subject to the tribe's right of occupancy, and that—while the federal government could terminate that right occupancy—the federal government could not acquire fee title by doing so.

In Jackson v. Hudson (N.Y. 1808) held that the nature of Indian title was an undecided question in New York, and avoided deciding the issue because neither party claimed its chain of title traced to Indians. The next term, when a party before the court claimed to derive title deeds from Indian sellers, the New York court held that such deeds were insufficient in Van Gorden v. Jackson (N.Y. 1809):

Though Indian deeds were obtained for the purpose of proving that the rights of the natives were extinguished, [such deeds] were never admitted, as of themselves, to be a source of legal title. [Indian deeds] were presented to government as an inducement to extend its boundary by grant, but the firm and unbending principle has uniformly been, that all titles must be derived, either mediately or immediately, actually or presumptively, from the Crown.

Following Fletcher v. Peck (1810), the latter view prevailed over the former in additional state courts. Other state courts disagreed.

== Opinions ==
=== Fletcher v. Peck (1810) ===
Oral arguments

Fletcher v. Peck (1810) is famous as the "first of the great nineteenth-century Contract Clause cases"; Marshall's majority, at the very end, "included only two sentence about the Indians, but they would prove to be influential." Fletcher was "[t]he first of the Marshall Court decisions to consider the relative rights of an Indian people and a state government in aboriginal lands," and "the first time the Supreme Court of the United States was called on to consider this issue." In the oral argument, Peck's lawyer "launched into the first discussion of the nature of Indian landownership ever to take place before the U.S. Supreme Court":

What is the Indian title? It is a mere occupancy for the purpose of hunting. It is not like our tenures; they have no idea of a title to the soil itself. It is overrun by them, rather than inhabited. It is not a true and legal possession. Vattel, b. 1. § 81. p. 37. and § 209. b. 2. § 97. Montesquieu, b. 18. c. 12. Smith's Wealth of Nations, b. 5. c. 1. It is a right not to be transferred but extinguished. It a right regulated by treaties, not by deeds of conveyance. It depends upon the law of nations, not upon municipal right.
Although the power to extinguish this right by treaty, is vested in congress, yet Georgia had a right to sell subject to the Indian claim. The point has never been decided in the courts of the United States, because it has never before been questioned.

Peck's lawyer raised the point in response to a question from the bench, almost certainly from Justice Johnson. Vattel, Montesquieu, and Smith all had two things in common: they falsely believed that Native Americans did not practice agriculture; and, they had never travelled to North America. Marshall did not cite these sources in his opinion in Fletcher, but he would cite all three in Johnson.

Marshall's majority

Marshall addressed the arguments raised by Peck's lawyers and Johnson's dissent at the very end of his majority opinion:

It was doubted whether a state can be seised in fee of lands, subject to the Indian title, and whether a decision that they were seised in fee, might not be construed to amount to a decision that their grantee might maintain an ejectment for them, notwithstanding that title.
The majority of the court is of opinion that the nature of the Indian title, which is certainly to be respected by all courts, until it be legitimately extinguished, is not such as to be absolutely repugnant to seisin in fee on the part of the state.

Marshall's formulation is actually a compromise: responding to Johnson's concern that Georgian land owners with such grants could evict Indians, while still trying to preserve the validity of the dominant form of land grant in the United States at the time. In doing so, Marshall in effect adopted the newer view of Indian title promulgated in state courts for two decades that the Indians did not own fee simple to their lands. Marshall's opinion did not spell out which methods could legitimately extinguish Indian title, or even whether the power resided with the state or federal government.

Johnson's dissent

Dissents were rare on the Marshall Court; Justice William Johnson dissented more frequently than most, but still quite rarely by modern standards. First, although Johnson agreed that the Georgia legislature could not revoke its land grant, he located such a prohibition in natural law, rather than the Contract Clause. More substantively, Johnson's opinion advocated the older view (from the state courts and colonial custom) that Indians held fee simple to their land, and that state land grants constituted a future executory interest.

Later history

In the oral arguments for Meigs v. M'Clung's Lessee (1815), Marshall asked a litigant about the validity of state grants before the extinguishment of aboriginal title; before the lawyer could finish responding that the question did not arise, Justice Joseph Story interrupted: "That question has been decided in the case of Fletcher v. Peck." Two years later, riding the Massachusetts Circuit, Story cited Fletcher for the proposition that states owned Indian land in fee simple before extinguishment. Justice Bushrod Washington, riding in Pennsylvania gave the same as a jury instruction. Litigants in the Supreme Court and state high courts cited Fletcher to similar effect.

=== Fairfax's Devisee v. Hunter's Lessee (1813) ===
Fairfax's Devisee v. Hunter's Lessee (1813) considered the rights of British aliens, holding title from a Royal grant, defending against an ejectment action pursuant to a Virginia statute. The Court (with Justices Marshall and Todd absent) held that the treaty between the United States and Great British, ratified subsequent to the ejectment judgement in the lower court but prior to the Virginia Supreme Court decision, should have prevented the ejectment.

=== Preston v. Browder (1816) ===
Preston v. Browder (1816) upheld North Carolina's nonintercourse act; both the statute and the conduct in question dated to the post-Revolution, pre-Articles of Confederation period. There, a plaintiff had acquired land in the western territory of North Carolina (part of Tennessee at the time of suit) in 1778 in violation of a 1777 North Carolina statute. The circuit court for the district of East Tennessee denied the plaintiff ejectment against another non-Indian, and the Supreme Court affirmed the ruling. Justice Thomas Todd, writing for a unanimous court, said the follow about aboriginal title:

North Carolina, at the time of passing this act, . . . had, but a short time before, shaken off her colonial government, and assumed a sovereign independent . . . . [D]uring the colonial system, . . . the citizens were restrained and prohibited from extending their settlements to the westward, so as to encroach on lands set apart for the Indian tribes . . . . [By treaty,] a boundary between the state and the said Indians was established. [The North Carolina nonintercourse act of November 1777 restriction the acquisition of lands] ‘which have accrued, or shall accrue, to this state, by treaty or conquest.’ . . . . It is not to be presumed, that the legislature intended, so shortly after making the treaty, to violate it, by permitting entries to be made west of the line fixed by the treaty. . . . [T]he legislative intention, to prohibit and restrict entries from being made on lands reserved for Indian tribes, may be discerned. [Amendments to the act passed after the acquisition in question] expressly forbid[] the entering or surveying any lands within the Indian hunting grounds, recognises the western boundary as fixed by the above-mentioned treaty, and declares void all entries and surveys which have been, or shall thereafter be made within the Indian boundary.

=== Danforth's Lessee v. Thomas (1816) ===
Danforth's Lessee v. Thomas (1816) was a companion case to Preston v. Browder, involving a similar dispute; this time, the relevant North Carolina statute was passed in 1783, during the Articles of Confederation period. The Cherokee's aboriginal title to the lands in question had been extinguished by the Treaty of Holston (1791), and the plaintiff seeking ejectment had acquired a state land grant from North Carolina that same year; the defendant held a state land grant from Tennessee issued in 1809. The plaintiff's land grant had been excluded from evidence, and the jury had thus returned a verdict for the defendant. The Justice Todd, again writing for a unanimous court, affirmed. The court was able to decide the case without reaching the question of aboriginal title:

Whether the legislature had the power, or intended to give the Indians a right of property in the soil, or merely the use and enjoyment of it, need not be inquired into, nor decided, by this court; for it is perfectly clear, that the [1983 act] prohibits all persons from making entries or surveys for any lands within the bounds set apart for the Cherokee Indians, and declares all such entries and grants thereupon, if any should be made, utterly void. [The defendant argues] that the mere extinguishment of the Indian title did not subject the land to appropriation, until an act of the legislature authorized or permitted it. Whatever doubts this court might entertain on this subject, were they now construing these laws upon the first impression, that doubt would be removed [by North Carolina case law].

=== Johnson v. McIntosh (1823) ===
Johnson v. McIntosh (1823), thirteen years after Fletcher, was the Supreme Court's "first detailed discussion of the subject" of indigenous title, today "remembered as the origin of the right of occupancy." Johnson remains "perhaps the best known of the Court's judgments on aboriginal title."

The primary effect of the Johnson decision was to remove the cloud of title, or the title to property, over the large number of state land grants on land which the indigenous title had not yet been taken away. Many quotes from Johnson have reverberated in legal quotations and law review titles for 200 years, including: "Conquest gives title which the Courts of the conquer cannot deny, whatever the private and speculative opinions of individuals may be, respecting the original justice of the claim."

Because the pre-Revolutionary transactions had taken place after the Royal Proclamation of 1763, Marshall could have decided the case simply by reliance on the proclamation; instead, he based his ruling on custom, looking equally to the law of nations of all hierarchy powers, not just the Natives.

Building upon the brief afterthought in the Fletcher decision, the Johnson decision added to the idea that indigenous nations did not hold fee simple, or unconditional ownership of their lands with the right to control or transfer them as they chose. Justice Johnson, still on the court, did not dissent again. The influence of the Johnson became grew during the "golden age of American legal treatises" that followed; the case figured prominently in, inter alia, James Kent's Commentaries on American Law (c. 1820) and Joseph Story's Commentaries on the Constitution (1833).

=== Danforth v. Wear (1824) ===
Danforth v. Wear (1824), like Preston v. Browder and Danforth's Lessee v. Thomas, involved conflicting land grants issued by North Carolina and Tennessee. The plaintiff's North Carolina land grant included both "a tract of country over which the Indian title had been extinguished" and "a large body of land, over which the Indian title existed at the time of the survey, but has since been extinguished." Once again, the trial court had deemed the plaintiff's grant void and excluded it from evidence; the Court observed that such a ruling "could only be sustained upon the ground that it was wholly void, or wholly inadmissible in that cause. For if the grant was good but for an acre of the land claimed in the action, the Court could not have withheld it from the jury."

Justice William Johnson delivered the opinion of the unanimous court. The Court cited Preston and Danforth's Lessee for the proposition that "the inviolability of the Indian territory is fully recognised." However, the Court reversed the judgment below and held that the grant should have been admissible in relation to the land over which aboriginal title had been extinguished at the time of the survey.

=== Harcourt v. Gaillard (1827) ===
In Harcourt v. Gaillard (1827), a case involving British land grants, the Court distinguished between conquest and change of sovereignty. As to conquest, the Court noted: "War is a suit prosecuted by the sword; and where the question to be decided is one of original claim to territory, grants of soil made flagrante bello by the party that fails, can only derive validity from treaty stipulations. It is not necessary here to consider the rights of the conqueror in case of actual conquest; since the views previously presented put the acquisition of such rights out of this case." Yet, the Court continued to recognize the principle that "a change of sovereignty produces no change in individual property, yet it imputes to them only a modified validity." The relevant statute provided that British land grants that were not accompanied by possession must be filed with a commission, and the Harcourt grant was not.

=== Cherokee Nation v. Georgia (1831) ===
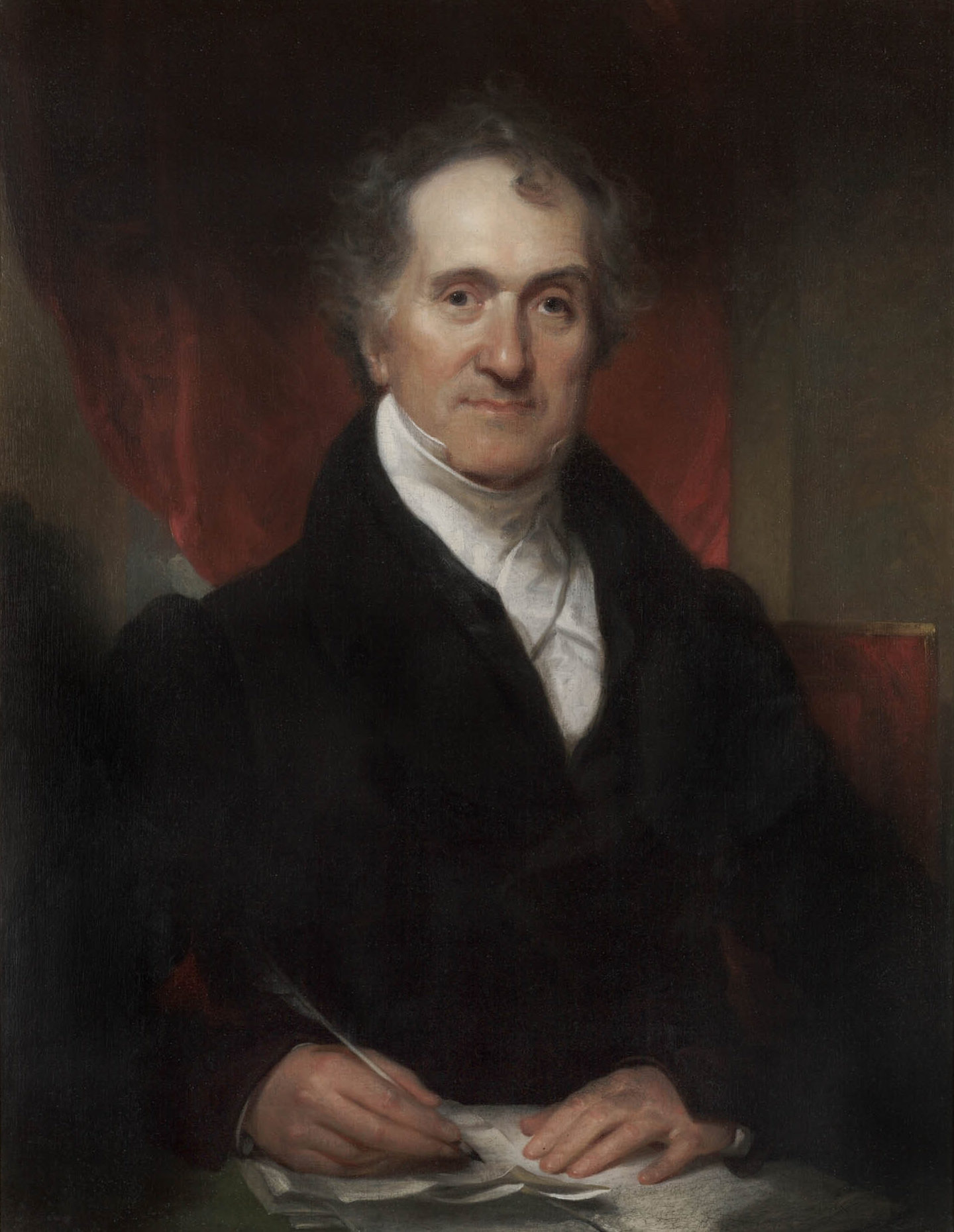
William Wirt, the lawyer for the Cherokee Nation, and later, for Samuel Worcester

Background

Fletcher and Johnson had established one principle that Native Americans soon hoped to be able to enforce: that a state government could not extinguish aboriginal title. William Wirt, former U.S. attorney general, tried three times in three years to get a case regarding Cherokee removal to the Supreme Court. In December 1830, Marshall granted a writ of error to a criminal case regarding a murder committed by a Cherokee, George Tassel, against another tribe member on Cherokee land, but Georgia executed him and mooted the case before Marshall could hear oral arguments.

Marshall's majority

In Cherokee Nation v. Georgia, Wirt filed directly in the Supreme Court seeking to invoke the Court's original jurisdiction to void the 1820s Georgia statutes declared unconstitutional, contrary to treaties between the U.S. and the Cherokees, or contrary to the Nonintercourse Act of 1802. Marshall decided that the Cherokee were a "domestic dependent nation," not a foreign state, and thus dismissed the case for lack of jurisdiction.

Thompson and Story's dissent

Justices Smith Thompson and Joseph Story dissented on the jurisdictional question, and thus reached the merits, siding with the Cherokee. According to Richard Peters, the court reporter, this dissent was written with the explicit encouragement and assistance of Marshall. Moreover, Marshall "encourage[d] Peters to publish a separate report" that included the dissents, oral arguments, treaties, and the opinion of James Kent for the Cherokees.

Thompson, with whom Story concurred, noted that although the U.S. had promised in a compact with Georgia to extinguish the aboriginal title, it had not done so yet, and thus: "[T]he state has not even a reversionary interest in the soil. . . . [U]ntil this is done, the state can have no claim to the lands." If the U.S. never extinguished the title, Thompson opined, Georgia could not force the U.S. to specifically perform the compact. Thompson would have enjoined the Georgia laws because: "The complaint is not of a mere private trespass, admitting of compensation in damages; but of injuries which go to the total destruction of the whole right of the complainants."

=== Worcester v. Georgia (1832) ===
Worcester v. Georgia (1832) was the third case by Wirt, appealing the conviction of Samuel Worcester for illegally residing on Cherokee lands without a license from the state. Although the holding of the opinion reached only the question of criminal jurisdiction, its dicta was far more pro-Indian than Fletcher or Johnson:

The extravagant and absurd idea, that the feeble settlements made on the sea coast, or the companies under whom they were made, acquired legitimate power by them to govern the people, or occupy the lands from sea to sea, did not enter the mind of any man. They were well understood to convey the title which, according to the common law of European sovereigns respecting America, they might rightfully convey, and no more. This was the exclusive right of purchasing such lands as the natives were willing to sell. The Crown could not be understood to grant what the Crown did not affect to claim, nor was it so understood.

Of course, the "extravagant and absurd" idea was one "that Marshall himself had played an important role in propagating nine years earlier in Johnson v. McIntosh." Worcester eventually resulted in the freeing of Samuel Worcester, but the decision did not invalidate any state or federal law, or impose any lingering obligation on the state or federal government. Three years later, the U.S. government signed the Treaty of New Echota (1835) with a "group of dissent Cherokees" and forced them on what became known as the "trail of tears."

=== United States v. Percheman (1833) ===
United States v. Percheman (1833) involved a Spanish land grant in Florida (and a non-indigenous plaintiff). Marshall, for a unanimous Court, reaffirmed the principle that (at least as far as European property owners—who gained U.S. citizenship—were concerned) the transfer of sovereignty—in Florida, from Spain to the United States—did not disturb private property rights. Marshall wrote:

[I]t is very unusual, even in cases of conquest, for the conqueror to do more than to displace the sovereign and assume dominion over the country. The modern usage of nations, which has become law, would be violated; that sense of justice and of right which is acknowledged and felt by the whole civilized world would be outraged, if private property should be generally confiscated, and private rights annulled. The people change their allegiance; their relation to their ancient sovereign is dissolved; but their relations to each other, and their rights of property, remain undisturbed. If this be the modern rule, even in cases of conquest, who can doubt its application to the case of an amicable cession of territory? Had Florida changed its sovereign by an act containing no stipulation respecting the property of individuals, the right of property in all those who became subjects or citizens of the new government would have been unaffected by the change; it would have remained the same as under the ancient sovereign. . . . A cession of territory is never understood to be a cession of the property belonging to its inhabitants. The king cedes that only which belonged to him; lands he had previously granted, were not his to cede. Neither party could so understand the cession; neither party could consider itself as attempting a wrong to individuals, condemned by the practice of the whole civilized world. The cession of a territory, by its name, from one sovereign to another, conveying the compound idea of surrendering at the same time the lands and the people who inhabit them, would be necessarily understood to pass the sovereignty only, and not to interfere with private property.

Marshall interpreted the provision of the Florida land act requiring Spanish grants to be filed within one year narrowly. Marshall stated: "It is impossible to suppose, that Congress intended to forfeit real titles, not exhibited to their commissioners within so short a period." He interpreted this provision to mean only that the commissioners could not grant title after one year, not that the property rights held by virtue of the Spanish grants were void.

=== Mitchel v. United States (1835) ===
Mitchel v. United States (1835), authored by Justice Henry Baldwin, was the last Marshall Court opinion on aboriginal title. At issue was 1,200,00 acres of land in Florida alienated to the Spanish crown in 1804 and 1806, and then granted to private parties. Baldwin, for a unanimous court, upheld those transactions. Noting that the Royal Proclamation of 1763 applied while Florida was under British rule from 1763 to 1783, Baldwin held that Spanish law (which he perceived to be materially the same as British law in this respect) governed the extinguishment of aboriginal title when the territory reverted to Spanish rule from 1783 to 1821. Placing Mitchel within the larger body of the Marshall Court's decisions regarding aboriginal title has proven difficult, with some legal scholars contending that Mitchel was an "implicit repudiation" of the doctrine of discovery outlined by M'Intosh and others arguing that the decision "endorsed and applied the Johnson discovery rule."

== International legacy ==
According to Canadian lawyer John Hurley, the Marshall Court's decisions regarding aboriginal title "established the fundamental principles of aboriginal rights by which courts of many jurisdictions have guided themselves ever since." According to Hurley:

Delivered over a period of thirty-five years, the judgements bear witness to the evolution of the Marshall Court's thinking on aboriginal rights, culminating in an appraisal of them as full rights of beneficial ownership of the land and internal self-government. In order to understand the Marshall Court's assessment of aboriginal rights, it is essential to appreciate the progression in its treatment of the topic. Failure to do so, by placing excessive weight on the earlier and neglecting the later of these decisions, has sometimes led to distortions of the Marshall Court's views on aboriginal rights.

=== Canada ===
According to Hurley, "[t]he Marshall Court's judgments on aboriginal rights are of particular importance for Canada" because, as emphasized by decisions of the Supreme Court of Canada, "they were founded upon a policy towards indigenous peoples and their lands applied consistently by the imperial British government throughout its North American dominions." Hurley argues:

Given the repeated reliance upon the Marshall Court's decisions by Canadian courts in adjudicating aboriginal claims, the authority of those decisions in Canada must now be accepted as certain. They have been so often applied by the Canadian courts that they may now be considered as virtually incorporated into Canadian common law.

Hurley concludes:

Elegant in language and persuasive in logic, the five classic judgments [Fletcher v. Peck, Johnson v. McIntosh, Cherokee Nation v. Georgia, Worcester v. Georgia, and Mitchel v. United States] of the Marshall Court on aboriginal rights remain as compelling today was when they were written. They provide simple and workable principles for the definition and reconciliation of respective Indian and Canadian state rights of territory and government. These principles flow from the Court's consideration of the law of nations and British colonial policy regarding relations with the aboriginal peoples of North America. They are not specific to the constitutional context of the United States of America, but apply equally within Canada.
