= Estrepement =

Type of damage to rented property

The writ of estrepement (/ɛˈstriːp.mənt/ eh-STREEP-mənt), or de estrepamento (/ˌdiː ɛˌstrɛpəˈmɛn.toʊ/ DEE-eh-STREP-ə-MEN-toh), was a writ in common law countries that would be used to prevent estrepement, a type of 'voluntary waste' (a change in condition of real property brought about by a current tenant that damages or destroys the value of that property). The waste that the writ would issue to prevent would be waste that occurred in response to a lawsuit seeking possession of the land, or a judgment against the waster where possession had not yet been delivered.

== England ==
In his Commentaries, Blackstone noted that this common law writ would lie originally to prevent waste that took place between judgment in a real action and delivery of possession by the sheriff. Following the Statute of Gloucester, a writ of estrepement pendente placito would lie to prevent estrepement pending the outcome of a case. Either writ empowered the sheriff to prevent such waste, allowing him to imprison the waster, and even to raise a posse comitatus to assist him. According to Finlason, the basic writ of estrepement was an original writ that had to be sued out of chancery, whereas the writ pendente placito was a writ issued from the bench.

Where the tenant is alleged to have disobeyed the writ, a venire facias would issue and the tenant would be attached. The standard pleading in response was to deny any waste contrary to the writ, and the issue would be tried by a jury, with the outcome resulting in a conviction for contempt of court.

When John Puckering was Lord Keeper, one of his actions was to restrict the issuance of writs of estrepement, as well as other writs such as audita querela, unless he allowed it. Holdsworth suggests this might have been part of an effort to keep the courts of common law from entering into matters of equity.

While analogous to the injunction in equity, one major difference is that the grounds for the issuance of the writ was not the inequitable conduct of the defendant, but that the use of the land in the manner prohibited would work to commit a wrong. Also, unlike injunctions and the writ of prohibition, the writ of estrepement merely stopped further damage, and could not command the repair or replacement of property already damaged. Two important similarities are that both are in personam orders, and that disobedience may result in imprisonment.

The injunction ultimately supplanted the writ, and the writ was ultimately abolished in England by the Real Property Limitation Act 1833.

== United States ==
In the United States, the writ of estrepement persisted in some state courts for a time, but is rarely used. For instance, in the 1844 case of Brown v. O'Brien, the writ pendente placito issued in a Pennsylvania ejectment case where evidence was proffered indicating that the tenants were in the process of cutting timber and digging for minerals in the land at issue. By 1929, one law review noted that the injunction had "to a great extent" taken the place of estrepement and common law actions for waste generally. As late as 1978, however, the writ may have been available in Delaware, which has not combined its courts of law and equity. In Voss v. Green, the plaintiffs brought an ejectment action in the Superior Court contending that the defendants had built a driveway on their land, and in response the defendants sought a writ of estrepement because the plaintiffs had plowed up the driveway. The court declined to issue the writ, holding that the damage done was not within the scope of the writ, and that the appropriate relief was an injunction, which would have to be obtained in the Court of Chancery. One source notes that the writ still exists in Pennsylvania and Rhode Island.
