= Tassell =

Tassell is a surname. Notable people with the surname include:

- Kris Tassell
- Gustave Tassell (1926–2014), American fashion designer
- Doug Tassell
- Thomas Tassell Grant
- Maiden name of Rebecca Welles

== See also ==
- Tassel (disambiguation)
- Van Tassel
- Van Tassell (disambiguation)
