= List of United States Supreme Court cases, volume 60 =

Supreme Court of the United States
- Interactive map of Supreme Court of the United States
- 38°53′26″N 77°00′16″W
- Established: March 4, 1789; 236 years ago
- Location: Washington, D.C.
- Coordinates: 38°53′26″N 77°00′16″W
- Composition method: Presidential nomination with Senate confirmation
- Authorised by: Constitution of the United States, Art. III, § 1
- Judge term length: life tenure, subject to impeachment and removal
- Number of positions: 9 (by statute)
- Website: supremecourt.gov

This is a list of cases reported in volume 60 (19 How.) of United States Reports, decided by the Supreme Court of the United States in 1856 and 1857.

== Nominative reports ==
In 1874, the U.S. government created the United States Reports, and retroactively numbered older privately published case reports as part of the new series. As a result, cases appearing in volumes 1–90 of U.S. Reports have dual citation forms; one for the volume number of U.S. Reports, and one for the volume number of the reports named for the relevant reporter of decisions (these are called "nominative reports").

=== Benjamin Chew Howard ===
Starting with the 42nd volume of U.S. Reports, the Reporter of Decisions of the Supreme Court of the United States was Benjamin Chew Howard. Howard was Reporter of Decisions from 1843 to 1860, covering volumes 42 through 65 of United States Reports which correspond to volumes 1 through 24 of his Howard's Reports. As such, the dual form of citation to, for example, Lathrop v. Judson is 60 U.S. (19 How.) 66 (1857).

== Justices of the Supreme Court at the time of 60 U.S. (19 How.) ==
The Supreme Court is established by Article III, Section 1 of the Constitution of the United States, which says: "The judicial Power of the United States, shall be vested in one supreme Court . . .". The size of the Court is not specified; the Constitution leaves it to Congress to set the number of justices. Under the Judiciary Act of 1789 Congress originally fixed the number of justices at six (one chief justice and five associate justices). Since 1789 Congress has varied the size of the Court from six to seven, nine, ten, and back to nine justices (always including one chief justice).

When the cases in 60 U.S. (19 How.) were decided the Court comprised these nine members:

Portrait	Justice	Office	Home State	Succeeded	Date confirmed by the Senate (Vote)	Tenure on Supreme Court
	Roger B. Taney	Chief Justice	Maryland	John Marshall	March 15, 1836 (29–15)	March 28, 1836 – October 12, 1864 (Died)
	John McLean	Associate Justice	Ohio	Robert Trimble	March 7, 1829 (Acclamation)	January 11, 1830 – April 4, 1861 (Died)
	James Moore Wayne	Associate Justice	Georgia	William Johnson	January 9, 1835 (Acclamation)	January 14, 1835 – July 5, 1867 (Died)
	John Catron	Associate Justice	Tennessee	newly created seat	March 8, 1837 (28–15)	May 1, 1837 – May 30, 1865 (Died)
	Peter Vivian Daniel	Associate Justice	Virginia	Philip P. Barbour	March 2, 1841 (25–5)	January 10, 1842 – May 31, 1860 (Died)
	Samuel Nelson	Associate Justice	New York	Smith Thompson	February 14, 1845 (Acclamation)	February 27, 1845 – November 28, 1872 (Retired)
	Robert Cooper Grier	Associate Justice	Pennsylvania	Henry Baldwin	August 4, 1846 (Acclamation)	August 10, 1846 – January 31, 1870 (Retired)
	Benjamin Robbins Curtis	Associate Justice	Massachusetts	Levi Woodbury	December 20, 1851 (Acclamation)	October 10, 1851 – September 30, 1857 (Resigned)
	John Archibald Campbell	Associate Justice	Alabama	John McKinley	March 22, 1853 (Acclamation)	April 11, 1853 – April 30, 1861 (Resigned)

== Notable Case in 60 U.S. (19 How.) ==
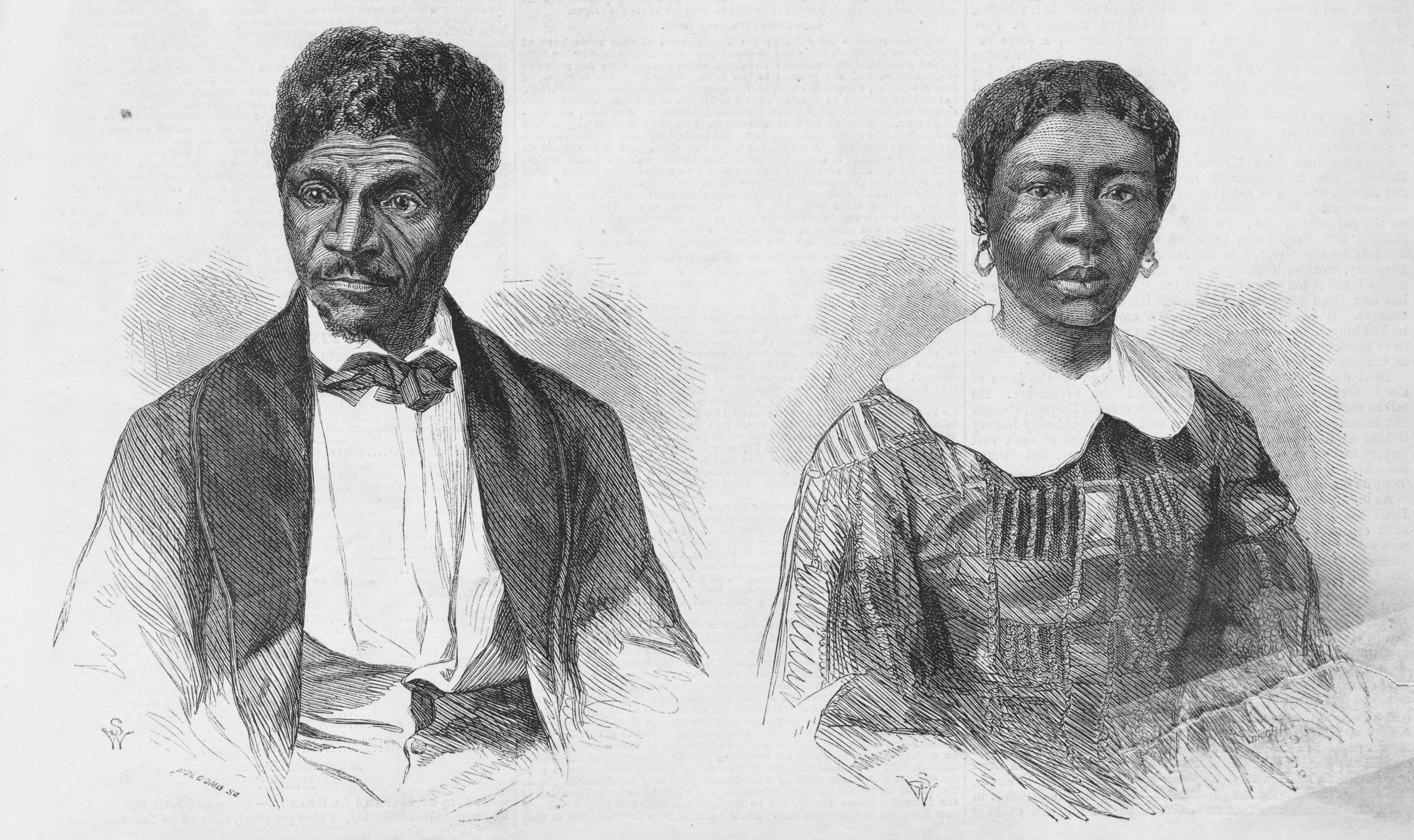

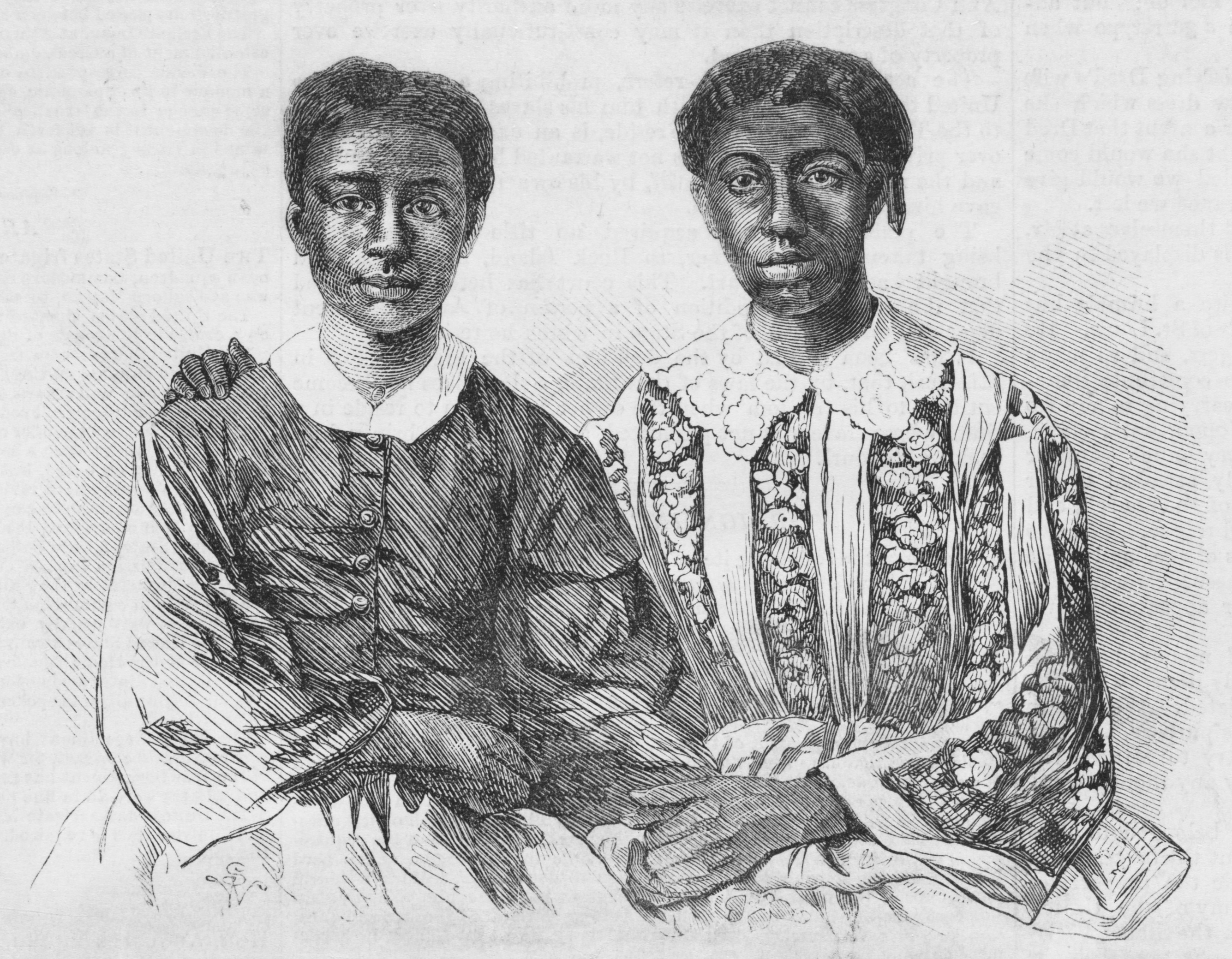
Dred and Harriet Scott (top) and their children, Eliza and Lizzie

=== Scott v. Sanford ===
Scott v. Sandford, 60 U.S. (19 How.) 393 (1857), is the most notorious and condemned decision in the history of the U.S. Supreme Court. In it, the Court held that the US Constitution was not meant to include American citizenship for black people, regardless of whether they were enslaved or free, and so the rights and privileges that the Constitution confers upon American citizens could not apply to them. Although Chief Justice Roger Taney and several of the other justices hoped that the decision would permanently settle the slavery controversy, which was increasingly dividing the American public, the decision's effect was the opposite. Taney's majority opinion suited the slaveholding states, but was intensely decried in the other states. The decision inflamed the national debate over slavery and deepened the divide that led ultimately to the Civil War. In 1865, after the Union won the Civil War, the Dred Scott ruling was voided by the Thirteenth Amendment to the US Constitution, which abolished slavery except as punishment for a crime, and the Fourteenth Amendment, which guaranteed citizenship for "all persons born or naturalized in the United States, and subject to the jurisdiction thereof". The Supreme Court's decision has been continuously denounced ever since, both for its overt racism and its role in the near destruction of the United States four years later. Bernard Schwartz said that it "stands first in any list of the worst Supreme Court decisions—Chief Justice Hughes called it the Court's greatest self-inflicted wound." Junius P. Rodriguez wrote that it is "universally condemned as the U.S. Supreme Court's worst decision". Historian David Thomas Konig agrees that it was "unquestionably, our court's worst decision ever."

== Citation style ==
Under the Judiciary Act of 1789 the federal court structure at the time comprised District Courts, which had general trial jurisdiction; Circuit Courts, which had mixed trial and appellate (from the US District Courts) jurisdiction; and the United States Supreme Court, which had appellate jurisdiction over the federal District and Circuit courts—and for certain issues over state courts. The Supreme Court also had limited original jurisdiction (i.e., in which cases could be filed directly with the Supreme Court without first having been heard by a lower federal or state court). There were one or more federal District Courts and/or Circuit Courts in each state, territory, or other geographical region.

Bluebook citation style is used for case names, citations, and jurisdictions.

- "C.C.D." = United States Circuit Court for the District of . . .
  - e.g.,"C.C.D.N.J." = United States Circuit Court for the District of New Jersey
- "D." = United States District Court for the District of . . .
  - e.g.,"D. Mass." = United States District Court for the District of Massachusetts
- "E." = Eastern; "M." = Middle; "N." = Northern; "S." = Southern; "W." = Western
  - e.g.,"C.C.S.D.N.Y." = United States Circuit Court for the Southern District of New York
  - e.g.,"M.D. Ala." = United States District Court for the Middle District of Alabama
- "Ct. Cl." = United States Court of Claims
- The abbreviation of a state's name alone indicates the highest appellate court in that state's judiciary at the time.
  - e.g.,"Pa." = Supreme Court of Pennsylvania
  - e.g.,"Me." = Supreme Judicial Court of Maine

== List of cases in 60 U.S. (19 How.) ==
Case Name	Page and year	Opinion of the Court	Concurring opinion(s)	Dissenting opinion(s)	Lower court	Disposition
Prevost v. Greneaux	1 (1857)	Taney	none	none	La.	affirmed
Morgan v. Curtenius	8 (1857)	Taney	none	none	C.C.D. Ill.	continued
Ex parte Secombe	9 (1857)	Taney	none	none	Sup. Ct. Terr. Minn.	mandamus denied
Shaffer v. Scudday	16 (1857)	Taney	none	none	La.	dismissed
Thomas v. Osborn	22 (1856)	Curtis	none	Taney	C.C.D. Md.	remand to dismiss
Ure v. Coffman	56 (1857)	Wayne	none	none	C.C.E.D. La.	affirmed
Stevens v. Gladding	64 (1857)	McLean	none	none	C.C.D.R.I.	affirmed
Lathrop v. Judson	66 (1857)	McLean	none	none	C.C.E.D. La.	affirmed
Moore v. Greene	69 (1856)	McLean	none	none	C.C.D.R.I.	affirmed
Betts v. Lewis	72 (1857)	Curtis	none	none	N.D. Ala.	remand for amendment
United States v. Le Baron	73 (1856)	Curtis	none	none	C.C.S.D. Ala.	reversed
Willot v. Sandford	79 (1856)	Catron	none	none	C.C.D. Mo.	reversed
Vandewater v. Mills	82 (1857)	Grier	none	none	C.C.D. Cal.	affirmed
The Brig Neurea	92 (1856)	Grier	none	none	N.D. Cal.	reversed
Seymour v. McCormick	96 (1857)	Nelson	none	none	C.C.N.D.N.Y.	affirmed
The Steamer St. Charles	108 (1857)	Nelson	none	none	C.C.E.D. La.	reversed
Coiron v. Millaudon	113 (1857)	Nelson	none	none	C.C.E.D. La.	affirmed
Long v. O'Fallon	116 (1856)	Campbell	none	none	C.C.D. Mo.	affirmed
Baker v. Nachtrieb	126 (1856)	Campbell	none	none	C.C.W.D. Pa.	reversed
Meegan v. Boyle	130 (1857)	McLean	none	none	C.C.D. Mo.	affirmed
Post v. Jones	150 (1857)	Grier	none	none	C.C.S.D.N.Y.	reversed
E.I. DuPont de Nemours Company v. Vance	162 (1857)	Curtis	none	Campbell	C.C.E.D. La.	reversed
The Steamer Virginia	182 (1857)	Taney	none	none	C.C.D. Md.	dismissed
Brown v. Duchesne	183 (1857)	Taney	none	none	C.C.D. Mass.	affirmed
Mordecai v. Lindsay	199 (1857)	Wayne	none	none	C.C.D.S.C.	reversed
Cousin v. Labatut	202 (1857)	Catron	none	none	La.	reversed
Hartshorn v. Day	211 (1857)	Nelson	none	none	C.C.D.R.I.	reversed
Slater v. Emerson	224 (1857)	McLean	none	none	C.C.D. Mass.	reversed
Schuchardt v. Babbidge	239 (1857)	Nelson	none	none	C.C.S.D.N.Y.	affirmed
New York and Virginia Steamship Company v. Calderwood	241 (1857)	Campbell	none	none	C.C.S.D.N.Y.	affirmed
Williams v. Hill McLane and Company	246 (1857)	Campbell	none	none	M.D. Ala.	affirmed
Bell v. Hearne	252 (1857)	Campbell	none	none	La.	reversed
Richardson v. City of Boston	263 (1857)	Grier	none	none	C.C.D.R.I.	reversed
Hipp v. Babin	271 (1857)	Campbell	none	none	C.C.E.D. La.	affirmed
Wolfe v. Lewis	280 (1857)	McLean	none	none	N.D. Ala.	reversed
Beebe v. Russell	283 (1857)	Wayne	none	none	C.C.D. Ark.	dismissed
Farrelly v. Woodfolk	288 (1857)	Wayne	none	none	C.C.E.D. Ark.	dismissed
Babcock v. Wyman	289 (1857)	McLean	none	Catron, Campbell	C.C.D. Mass.	affirmed
Byers v. Surget	303 (1857)	Daniel	none	none	C.C.E.D. Ark.	affirmed
Garrison v. Memphis Insurance Company	312 (1857)	Campbell	none	none	C.C.D. Mo.	affirmed
Commercial Mutual Marine Insurance Company v. Union Mutual Insurance Company of New York	318 (1857)	Curtis	none	none	C.C.D. Mass.	affirmed
Field v. Seabury I	323 (1857)	Wayne	none	none	C.C.D. Cal.	reversed
Field v. Seabury II	333 (1857)	Wayne	none	none	C.C.D. Cal.	reversed
Bryan v. Forsyth	334 (1857)	Catron	none	McLean	C.C.N.D. Ill.	reversed
Ballance v. Papin	342 (1857)	Catron	none	none	C.C.N.D. Ill.	reversed
United States v. Peralta	343 (1857)	Grier	none	none	S.D. Cal.	affirmed
McCullough v. Roots	349 (1857)	Campbell	none	none	C.C.D. Md.	affirmed
Walton v. Cotton	355 (1857)	McLean	none	Curtis	Tenn.	reversed
Pratt v. Reed	359 (1857)	Nelson	none	none	C.C.N.D.N.Y.	reversed
The Steam Boat Sultana	362 (1857)	Nelson	none	none	C.C.N.D.N.Y.	affirmed
United States v. Sutherland	363 (1857)	Grier	none	none	S.D. Cal.	affirmed
Fellows v. Blacksmith	366 (1857)	Nelson	none	none	N.Y. Sup. Ct.	affirmed
Roberts v. Cooper	373 (1857)	Wayne	none	none	C.C.D. Mich.	bond increase denied
McRea v. Bank of Alabama	376 (1857)	Curtis	none	none	C.C.E.D. Ark.	affirmed
Michigan Central Railroad Company v. Lake Shore and Michigan Southern Railway Company	378 (1857)	Grier	none	none	Mich.	dismissed
Ballard v. Thomas	382 (1857)	Nelson	none	none	C.C.D. Md.	affirmed
Platt v. Jerome	384 (1856)	Nelson	none	none	C.C.S.D.N.Y.	appeal denied
United States v. City Bank of Columbus	385 (1857)	Daniel	none	none	C.C.S.D. Ohio	certification
Burke v. Gaines	388 (1857)	Taney	none	none	Ark.	dismissed
Bulkley v. Honold	390 (1857)	Curtis	none	none	C.C.E.D. La.	affirmed
Scott v. Sandford	393 (1857)	Taney	Wayne, Catron, Daniel, Grier, Campbell	Curtis, McLean	C.C.D. Mo.	reversed

== See also ==
certificate of division
