= Tassel (disambiguation) =

A tassel is a finishing feature in fabric decoration.

Tassel may also refer to:

- Male inflorescence of maize.
- Tassel flower
- Tassel fern
- Tzitzit, sometimes translated as "tassels"
- Sword knot
- Hôtel Tassel, a UNESCO World Heritage house in Brussels, Belgium
- Tassel (surname)
