= United States v. Le Baron =

- Supreme Court of the United States

Decided January 1, 1856
- Full case name: United States v. Le Baron
- Citations: 60 U.S. 73 (more)

Holding
- An officer of the United States is appointed to his office when his commission is signed and seal by the President. The failure of the officeholder to receive such commission does not invalidate the appointment.

Court membership
- Chief Justice Roger B. Taney Associate Justices John McLean · James M. Wayne; John Catron · Peter V. Daniel; Samuel Nelson · Robert C. Grier; Benjamin R. Curtis · John A. Campbell

Case opinion
- Majority: Curtis, joined by unanimous

Laws applied
- U.S. Const. art. II, § 2, cl. 2

United States v. Le Baron, 60 U.S. 73 (1856), was a decision of the United States Supreme Court in which the court held that an officer of the United States is appointed to his office when his commission is signed and seal by the President. The failure of the officeholder to receive such commission does not invalidate the appointment.
