= Van Tassell =

Van Tassell may refer to:

- Marie Van Tassell
- Van Tassell, Wyoming
- A namesake of the Van Tassell and Kearney Horse Auction Mart
- Van Tassell family, 18th century owners of Sunnyside (Tarrytown, New York)
- Baltus and Katrina Van Tassel, characters in The Legend of Sleepy Hollow

== See also ==
- Van Tassel
- Tassell (surname)
