= Johnson v. McIntosh =

- Supreme Court of the United States

Argued February 15–19, 1823 Decided February 28, 1823
- Full case name: Johnson and Graham’s Lessee v. William McIntosh
- Citations: 21 U.S. 543 (more) 8 Wheat. 543; 5 L. Ed. 681; 1823 U.S. LEXIS 293

Case history
- Prior: Appeal from the District Court of Illinois
- Subsequent: None

Holding
- Johnson's lessees cannot eject McIntosh because their title, derived from private purchases from Indians, could not be valid.

Court membership
- Chief Justice John Marshall Associate Justices Bushrod Washington · William Johnson; H. Brockholst Livingston · Thomas Todd; Gabriel Duvall · Joseph Story

Case opinion
- Majority: Marshall, joined by unanimous

Laws applied
- Custom

Johnson v. McIntosh, (Note: This is the spelling used by the Supreme Court in modern cases, such as County of Oneida v. Oneida Indian Nation of New York State (1985) (citing McIntosh). In early volumes of the United States Reports, cases with "Mac-" surnames were printed using a turned comma to represent a small superscript c. For example, McIntosh and McCulloch v. Maryland were printed as M‘Intosh and M‘Culloch.) 21 U.S. (8 Wheat.) 543 (1823), also written Johnson v. M‘Intosh, is a landmark decision of the U.S. Supreme Court that held that private citizens could not purchase lands from Native Americans, referred to as "Indians" in the judgment. As the facts were recited by Chief Justice John Marshall, the successor in interest to a private purchase from the Piankeshaw attempted to maintain an action of ejectment against the holder of a federal land patent.

The case is one of the most influential and well-known decisions of the Marshall Court, a fixture of the first-year curriculum in nearly all U.S. law schools. Marshall's opinion lays down the foundations of the doctrine of aboriginal title in the United States, and the related doctrine of discovery. However, the vast majority of the opinion is dicta; as valid title is a basic element of the cause of action for ejectment, the holding does not extend to the validity of McIntosh's title, much less the property rights of the Piankeshaw. Thus, all that the opinion holds with respect to aboriginal title is that it is inalienable, a principle that remains well-established law in nearly all common law jurisdictions.

Citation to Johnson has been a staple of federal and state cases related to Native American land title for 200 years. Like Johnson, nearly all of those cases involve land disputes between two non-Native parties, typically one with a chain of title tracing to a federal or state government and the other with a chain of title predating U.S. sovereignty. A similar trend can be seen in the early case law of Australia, Canada, and New Zealand. The first land dispute involving an indigenous party to reach to the Supreme Court was Cherokee Nation v. Georgia (1831).

== Background ==
Thomas Johnson, one of the first Supreme Court justices, bought land from Piankeshaw Native American tribes in 1773 and 1775. The plaintiffs were lessees of Thomas Johnson's descendants, who had inherited the land. The defendant, William McIntosh, subsequently obtained a land patent, according to the facts as Marshall accepted them, to this same land from the United States. In fact, the two parcels did not overlap at all. Further, there is evidence that the parties were aware the tracts did not overlap and purposely misrepresented the facts to the court to obtain a ruling.

== Prior history ==
The plaintiffs brought an action for ejectment against McIntosh in the United States District Court for the District of Illinois, contending that their chain of title was superior by virtue of Johnson's purchases. The District Court dismissed the claim on the grounds that the Piankeshaw were not able to convey the land.

== Opinion ==
Marshall, writing for a unanimous court, affirmed the dismissal.

Marshall begins with a lengthy discussion of the history of the European colonization of the Americas and the legal foundations of the American Colonies. In particular, Marshall focuses on the manner in which each European power took land from the indigenous occupants. European powers used conquest and treaties to claim vast territories in North America, regardless of Indigenous occupation. Synthesizing the law of colonizing powers, Marshall traces the outlines of the "discovery doctrine"—namely, that a European power gains radical title (also known as sovereignty) to the land it discovers. As a corollary, the "discovering" power gains the exclusive right to extinguish the "right of occupancy" of the Indigenous occupants, which otherwise survived the assumption of sovereignty.

By negotiating treaties, nations surrendered the exclusive right to acquire territory from the Indians, not just land they physically held. At the conclusion of the French and Indian War, France ceded all its territories east of the Mississippi (like Canada) to Great Britain, while Great Britain ceded its claims west of the river to France. Spain also ceded Florida to Britain. These diplomatic exchanges transferred sovereign claims over entire regions, even though, as Marshall notes, "a great and valuable part" of these lands were occupied by Native Americans.

While European nations recognized Native Americans' immediate right to live on and use their land (the "right of occupancy"), they asserted a superior, "ultimate dominion" or underlying ownership for themselves. Based on this asserted ultimate dominion, they claimed the power to grant the land to settlers through charters. Crucially, these colonial grants were understood to give the grantees full legal title, subject only to the remaining, and now subordinate, "Indian right of occupancy."

Marshall further opined that when it declared independence from the Crown, the United States government inherited the right of preemption over Native American lands. The legal result is that the only Native American conveyances of land that can create valid title are sales of land to the federal government.

== Legacy ==
=== Law and economics ===
At least one commentator has noted that Johnson, by holding that only the federal government could purchase Native American lands, created a system of monopsony, which avoided bidding competition between settlers and thus enabled the acquisition of Native American lands at the lowest possible cost.

=== Role in law school curriculum ===
Prof. Stuart Banner at UCLA School of Law, writes of the case:

Johnson's continuing prominence is reinforced every year in law schools, where it is the very first case most beginning students read in their required course in Property. The bestselling property casebook calls Johnson 'the genesis of our subject' because it lays 'the foundations of landownership in the United States.' Given current understandings surrounding Indigenous law, and the role of Native Americans in America, the outcome of the case has come to be viewed with disapproval in law school. Johnson has joined Dred Scott v. Sandford and a few others to form a small canon (or maybe an anti-canon) of famous cases law students are taught to criticize. The leading casebook describes the philosophy underlying Johnson as "discomforting" and quotes with approval the recent view of a law professor that Marshall's opinion "was rooted in a Eurocentric view of the inferiority of the Indian people." Johnson, though, might be the only member of this anti-canon that remains the law, and that is still cited as authority by lower courts several times a year.

In 1998, Native American legal scholar Matthew Fletcher reflected on his experience studying the case, portraying it as fundamental to founding injustices in American society:

"Maybe you can kill people and destroy what they are and call it legal and fair play."

=== Catholic teaching on the Doctrine of Discovery ===
The Vatican on March 30, 2023 formally repudiated the "doctrine of discovery," officially declaring that that legal doctrine, used historically to justify colonial exploitation, is "not part of the teaching of the Catholic Church," and that the papal bulls used to justify it (such as Inter caetera) "have never been considered expressions of the Catholic faith."

Cardinal Michael Czerny, commenting on the Vatican's repudiation, stated that "the 'Doctrine of Discovery' is an invention or creation of the U.S. Supreme Court in the 19th century."
