= William Francis Finlason =

English journalist and legal writer

William Francis Finlason (1818–1895) was an English journalist and legal writer.

== Life ==
The son of Thomas Finlason of Camberwell, Surrey, he entered the Middle Temple on 5 January 1841, and for some years practised as a special pleader under the bar, reporting also for several years, as a member of the parliamentary corps of The Times in the Strangers' Gallery of the House of Commons. He was called to the bar on 21 November 1851, and joined the south-eastern circuit.

Finlason was a voluminous writer on legal subjects, and for nearly half a century he held the post of chief legal reporter for The Times. He recorded the cases tried in the Court of Queen's Bench.

A Roman Catholic convert of 1849, at the hands of Frederick William Faber, Finlason wrote for The Rambler and Dublin Review. He was a Catholic apologist, defender of John Henry Newman, and opponent of Whig historians.

Although only a "stuff-gown man" (junior barrister), Finlason was appointed one of the masters of the bench of the Middle Temple. He died on 11 March 1895 at his residence, 12 Campden Hill Road, Kensington, London.

== Works ==
Finlason's works included:

- A Selection of Leading Cases on Pleading and Parties to Actions, with practical Notes, London, 1847.
- The Catholic Hierarchy vindicated by the Law of England, London, 1851.
- Report of the Trial and Preliminary Proceedings in the Case of the Queen on the Prosecution of G. Achilli v. Dr. Newman, with an Introduction and Notes, London, 1852.
- An Essay on the History and Effects of the Laws of Mortmain, and the Laws against Testamentary Dispositions for Pious Purposes, London, 1853.
- The Acts for the better Regulation of Charitable Trusts, with Notes and an Introduction on the Jurisdiction exercised over them by the Court of Chancery, London, 1855.
- Parliamentary Influence and Official Intrigue, as recently disclosed in the Inquiry before a Select Committee on the Affair of the Ameer of Scinde, London, 1858.
- A Brief and Practical Exposition of the Law of Charitable Trusts, London, 1860.
- A Treatise on Martial Law, as allowed by the Law of England in time of Rebellion, London, 1866. This work was taken to be a defence of Edward John Eyre as Governor of Jamaica.
- Commentaries upon Martial Law, with special reference to its regulation and restraint, London, 1867.
- A Review of the Authorities as to the repression of Riot or Rebellion, with special reference to Criminal or Civil Liability, London, 1868.
- A History of the Jamaica Case: being an account, founded upon official documents, of the rebellion of the Negros in Jamaica , London [1868]; 2nd ed. 1869.
- A Dissertation on the History of Hereditary Dignities, particularly as to their course of descent, and their forfeitures by attainder. With special reference to the case of the Earldom of Wiltes, London, 1869.
- Justice to a Colonial Governor; or some considerations on the case of Mr. Eyre; containing the substance of all the documents. . . relating thereto, London, 1869.
- The History of the Law of Tenures of Land in England and Ireland; with particular reference to Inheritable Tenancy, London, 1870.
- An Exposition of our Judicial System and Civil Procedure, as reconstructed under the Judicature Acts, London, 1876.
- The Judgment of the Judicial Committee in the Folkestone Ritual Case, with an Historical Introduction and Notes, London, 1877.
- The Judicial Committee of the Privy Council. The History, Constitution, and Character of the Judicial Committee of the Privy Council, London, 1878.

== Notes ==
Attribution

This article incorporates text from a publication now in the public domain: Lee, Sidney, ed. (1901). "Finlason, William Francis". Dictionary of National Biography (1st supplement). Vol. 2. London: Smith, Elder & Co.
