= New York ex rel. Cutler v. Dibble =

- Supreme Court of the United States

Decided December 30, 1858
- Full case name: People of State of New York ex rel. Asa Cutler, John Underhill, and Arza Underhill v. Edgar C. Dibble, County Judge of Genesee County
- Citations: 62 U.S. 366 (more) 21 How. 366, 16 L. Ed. 149; 1858 U.S. LEXIS 653

Case history
- Prior: 18 Barb. 412 (N.Y. Sup. Gen. Term 1854), aff'd,16 N.Y. (2 E.P. Smith) 203 (1854)

Holding
- The New York nonintercourse act does not violate the Indian Commerce Clause, the federal Nonintercourse Act or the Treaty of Buffalo Creek

Court membership
- Chief Justice Roger B. Taney Associate Justices John McLean · James M. Wayne; John Catron · Peter V. Daniel; Samuel Nelson · Robert C. Grier; John A. Campbell · Nathan Clifford

Case opinion
- Majority: Grier

Laws applied
- U.S. Const. art. I, § 8, cl. 3; Nonintercourse Act; Treaty of Buffalo Creek

New York ex rel. Cutler v. Dibble, 62 U.S. (21 How.) 366 (1858), was a companion case to the more well-known Fellows v. Blacksmith (1857). At the time Fellows was decided, this case had reached the U.S. Supreme Court but had not yet been argued.

Members of the Seneca tribe had obtained a writ from the New York courts, under New York's state nonintercourse act, expelling the Ogden Land Company and their grantees. The defendants, before the Court, unsuccessfully challenged the state statute under the Indian Commerce Clause of the United States Constitution, the federal Nonintercourse Act and the Treaty of Buffalo Creek between the federal government and the Senecas. Because the Senecas relied on state law, and the defendants relied on federal law, the case is essentially the inverse of the litigation of aboriginal title in the United States over the next 150 years.

== Background ==
The Treaty of Buffalo Creek (1838) provided for the removal of the Senecas to modern-day Kansas, with their land to pass to the Ogden Land Company. The Tonawanda Band of Seneca Indians on the Tonawanda Reservation condemned the treaty, arguing that no sachem from their Band had signed. Prominent Seneca Ely S. Parker had retained lawyer John H. Martindale, who had brought four lawsuits against the Ogden Land Company and their grantees. The first two failed in the New York Supreme Court and New York Court of Appeals, respectively. The third, Fellows v. Blacksmith (1857), prevailed in the Court of Appeals and U.S. Supreme Court. In the fourth, New York ex rel. Cutler v. Dibble, a divided Court of Appeals had sided with the Seneca and the U.S. Supreme Court had agreed to hear the case at the time Fellows was decided.

== Prior history ==
The district attorney of Genesee County, New York brought suit on behalf of the Senecas against Asa Cutler, John Underhill, and Arza Underhill under a March 31, 1821 New York statute prohibiting non-Indians from settling or residing on lands belonging to or occupied by Indians. The statute provided that the county court should issue a warrant directing the sheriff to remove such persons: Specifically, the statute provided:

[I]t shall be unlawful for any person or persons, other than Indians, to settle or reside upon any lands belonging to or occupied by any nation or tribe of Indians within this state; and that all leases, contracts and agreements made by any Indians, whereby any person or persons, other than Indians, shall be permitted to reside upon such lands, shall be absolutely void; and if any person or persons shall settle or reside on any such lands, contrary to this act, it shall be the duty of any judge of any court of Common Pleas of the county within which such lands shall be situated, on complaint made to him, and on due proof of the fact of such settlement or residence, to issue his warrant, under his hand and seal, directed to the sheriff of such county, commanding him, within ten days after the receipt thereof, to remove such person or persons so settling or residing, with his, her or their families, from such lands.

The defendants claimed title from the Treaty of Buffalo creek and requested a jury trial. The county court sided with the Seneca and the proceedings were removed to the New York Supreme Court by certiorari.

The New York Supreme Court heard voluminous testimony and evidence, and held that "the Seneca nation had not duly granted and conveyed the reserve in question to Ogden and Fellows," but the U.S. Supreme Court did not reach this question, noting that it was not "material to our inquiry."

The New York Court of Appeals affirmed, holding that the 1821 New York statute did not violate the New York Constitution, and thus that the defendants had not acquired any property rights entitling them to a jury trial.

The U.S. Supreme Court granted a writ of error.

== Opinion ==
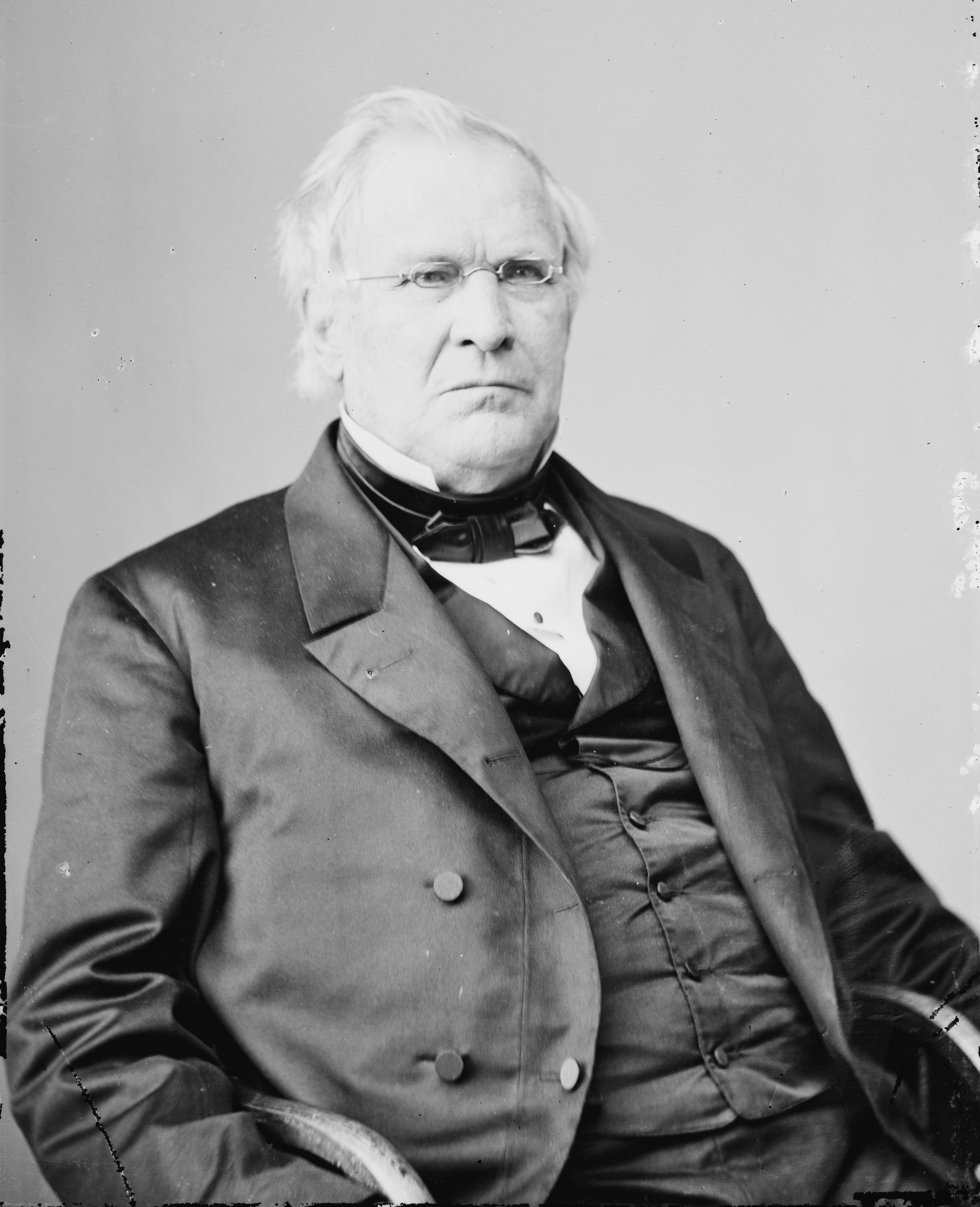
Justice Robert Cooper Grier delivered the judgement of the Court.

Justice Robert Cooper Grier delivered the opinion of the unanimous Court, affirming the judgement of the New York Court of appeals, with costs. The Court limited itself to examining whether the state statute and proceedings had violated any federal law, whether the Indian Commerce Clause of the United States Constitution, the federal Nonintercourse Act or the Treaty of Buffalo Creek between the federal government and the Senecas.

Federal constitution

The Court held that the state statute was a constitutional exercise of the state's police power:

The statute in question is a police regulation for the protection of the Indians from intrusion of the white people, and to preserve the peace. It is the dictate of a prudent and just policy. Notwithstanding the peculiar relation which these Indian nations hold to the Government of the United States, the State of New York had the power of a sovereign over their persons and property, so far as it was necessary to preserve the peace of the Commonwealth, and protect these feeble and helpless bands from imposition and intrusion. The power of a State to make such regulations to preserve the peace of the community is absolute, and has never been surrendered. The act is therefore not contrary to the Constitution of the United States.

Federal statute

The Court also held that the state statute did not violate any federal statute because "no law of Congress can be found which authorizes white men to intrude on the possessions of Indians."

Federal treaty

Finally, the Court held that the state statute did not violate the treaty because, pursuant to the Court's prior holding in Fellows v. Blacksmith (1856), the Seneca's removal was enforceable only by, and at the discretion of the federal government:

If the treaty of 1842 had been executed; if the United States, in their character of sovereign guardian of this nation, had delivered up the possession to these purchasers, then this statute of New York, when applied to them, would clearly be in conflict with their rights acquired under the treaty. But, by the case, it is admitted that the Indians have not been removed by the United States. The Tonawanda band is in peaceable possession of its reserve, and has hitherto refused to surrender it. Unless, therefore, these persons claiming under Ogden and Fellows have by the treaty a right of entry into these lands, and, as a consequence, to forcibly oust the possessors or turn them out by action of ejectment, they cannot allege that this summary removal by authority of the statute of New York is in conflict with the treaty, or any rights secured to the purchasers under it. This proceeding does not affect their title. The question of the validity of this treaty to bind the Tonawanda band is one to be decided, not by the courts, but by the political power which acted for and with the Indians. So far as the statute of New York is concerned, it only requires that the Indians be in possession; they are not bound to show that they are owners. They may invoke the aid of the statute against all white intruders, so long as they remain in the peaceable possession of their lands.

The Court reiterated the importance of the trust relationship between the federal government and the tribes from the Fellows precedent (the only case law cited in the opinion):

The Indians are to be removed to their new homes by their guardians, the United States, and cannot be expelled by irregular force or violence of the individuals who claim to have purchased their lands, nor even by the intervention of the courts of justice. Until such removal and surrender of possession by the intervention of the Government of the United States, the Indians and their possessions are protected, by the laws of New York, from the intrusion of their white neighbors.
