= John H. Martindale =

American military officer and lawyer

John Henry Martindale
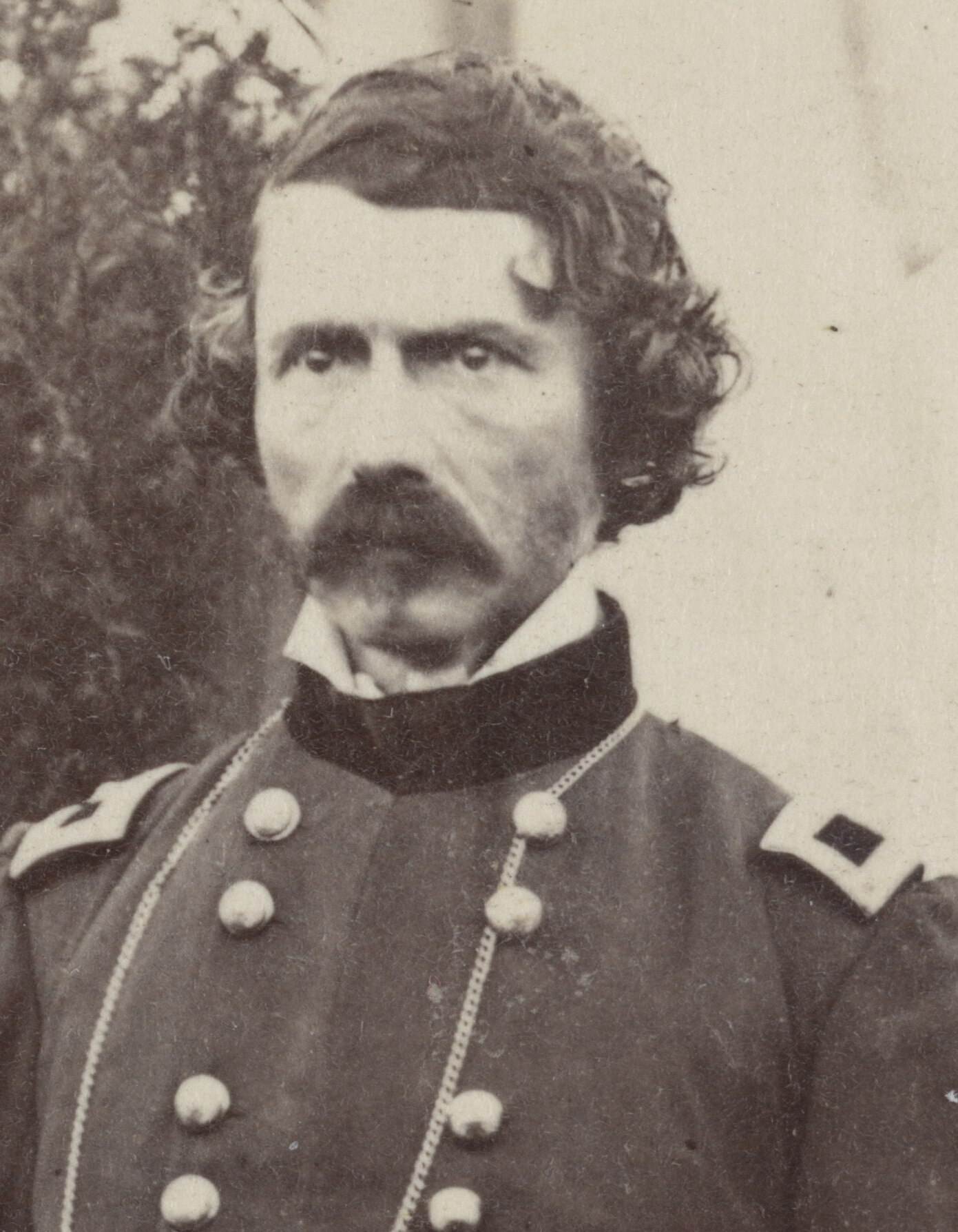
- Portrait of Martindale
- Born: March 20, 1815; Sandy Hill, New York, U.S.
- Died: December 13, 1881 (aged 66); Nice, France
- Burial place: Batavia Cemetery, Batavia, New York
- Military career
- Allegiance: United States of America; Union
- Branch: United States Army; Union Army
- Service years: 1835 - 1836, 1861 - 1864
- Rank: Brigadier General; Brevet Major General
- Conflicts: American Civil War; Peninsula campaign; Battle of Yorktown; Battle of Hanover Court House; Seven Days Battles; Battle of Beaver Dam Creek; Battle of Gaines' Mill; Battle of Malvern Hill; Bermuda Hundred campaign; Overland Campaign; Battle of Cold Harbor; Siege of Petersburg

John Henry Martindale (March 20, 1815 – December 13, 1881) was an American lawyer, Union Army general, and politician.

== Early life ==
Martindale was born in Sandy Hill, New York, the son of Congressman Henry C. Martindale and Minerva Hitchcock Martindale. He entered the United States Military Academy at West Point in 1831, and graduated in 1835. He was appointed a brevet second lieutenant, but resigned from the Army the next year and began to study law. He was admitted to the bar in 1838, and commenced practice in Batavia, New York. In 1840, he married Emeline M. Holden. He was District Attorney of Genesee County from 1842 to 1846, and from 1848 to 1851. Then he removed to Rochester, New York.

== Civil War ==
On August 9, 1861, Martindale was commissioned a brigadier general of volunteers in the Union Army, and was assigned to command a brigade within the Union Army of the Potomac. He later participated in all the battles of the Peninsula Campaign in V Corps. After the retreat from Malvern Hill, he was brevetted a major general of volunteers, and appointed Military Governor of Washington, D.C., a post he held from November 1862 to May 1864. Afterward, he returned to field service, fighting with the XVIII Corps in the Bermuda Hundred Campaign, the Battle of Cold Harbor and the Siege of Petersburg, commanding the corps briefly in mid-July 1864. In September 1864, he resigned his commission because of bad health.

== Return To Post-War Life ==
John H. Martindale was New York State Attorney General from 1866 to 1867, elected in 1865 on the Republican ticket.

In 1877, one of his clients tried to shoot him at his law office in Rochester, New York.

He died in Nice, Alpes-Maritimes, France, and was buried at the Batavia Cemetery in Batavia, New York.

== See also ==
- List of American Civil War generals (Union)
- Fellows v. Blacksmith (1857)
- New York ex rel. Cutler v. Dibble (1858)

Legal offices
Preceded by John Cochrane	New York State Attorney General; 1866–1867	Succeeded by Marshall B. Champlain
