= George "Corn" Tassel =

Illegally executed Native American

George Corn Tassel
- Utsi'dsata
- Died: December 24, 1830; Hall County, Georgia
- Cause of death: Execution

George "Corn" Tassel (Cherokee: Utsi'dsata) was known for being illegally tried, convicted, and executed for murder on December 24, 1830, by the State of Georgia. His case became the first Cherokee legal document to support Cherokee sovereignty, and by extension Native American sovereignty in general. As a result of this incident, the United States Supreme Court ruled in Worcester v. Georgia that the states do not have jurisdiction in Native American territories.

== Murder charges ==
In 1830 George Corn Tassel was charged with the murder of another Cherokee man at Talking Rock, within Cherokee territory. Corn Tassel had allegedly waylaid and killed Sanders "Talking Rock" Ford while under the influence of alcohol.

Talking Rock (now Pickens County, Georgia) was within the territory of the Cherokee Nation. It was 50 miles from Hall County, where Tassel was taken to be tried. Since the Cherokee Nation was considered sovereign by U.S. law, Tassel should have been tried in a Cherokee court.

== Trial and appeal ==
Tassel was tried on November 22, 1830, in the county seat, Gainesville, Georgia. The courthouse was a log cabin in the center of town. A jury of 12 white men found Tassel guilty of murder. Superior Court Judge Augustin Smith Clayton sentenced Tassel to death, to be hanged by the neck until dead.

Tassel's case was appealed and went before a 'convention of judges" of Georgia superior courts, at that time the de facto Georgia Supreme Court. The judges who denied his appeal included Augustin S. Clayton [who had presided over Tassel's trial], William Law, William H. Crawford, William H. Holt, L.Q.C. Lamar, Charles Daugherty, C.B. Strong, G.E. Thomas, L. Warren, John W. Hooper, and H. Warner.

At the request of Cherokee Chief John Ross, U.S. Attorney General William Wirt appealed Tassel's case to the Supreme Court, in Georgia v. Tassel. The Supreme Court accepted the appeal and issued a mandate forbidding Tassel's execution. The Court also ordered the state to produce the records of the trial. They ordered Georgia Governor George Gilmer to appear before them in January 1831.

Gilmer responded by calling an emergency session of the state's General Assembly on Dec. 22, 1830. In that session, laws were enacted nullifying any contracts between white and Cherokee people, requiring white residents of the Cherokee Nation to take a pledge of loyalty to the State of Georgia, and establishing a system whereby any white employees of the Cherokee had to obtain a permit from the State of Georgia to work for them.

After encouragement from Governor Gilmer, Judge Clayton refused the Supreme Court's demand for trial records and proceeded to have Corn Tassel executed by hanging on Dec. 24, 1830.

== Death ==
On Christmas Eve morning, Sheriff Jacob Eberhart conducted Tassel from the Hall County Jail in an oxcart to gallows erected in a field at the corner of Main and Grove streets, two blocks south of the log courthouse. Tassel was forced to sit on his own coffin in the wagon, where he was tied hand and foot. Judge Clayton stood by Eberhart as he conducted the execution.

Spectators came to the hanging from miles around, doubling the number of people in town to about 500. According to eyewitness accounts, "Tassel rode up to the gallows sitting on his coffin, ascended the low scaffold without a tremor, and talked with great calmness to the crowd...." After Tassel was dead, his body was given to his Cherokee friends. They buried him several hundred yards away in the vicinity of what is now Bradford Street in Gainesville.

== Aftermath and legacy ==
Wirt would later argue the Cherokee Nation's case unopposed in court on March 12 and 14, 1831. The Supreme Court found that, as it pertained to a criminal matter within the geographic boundaries of the State of Georgia, the case for the Cherokee Nation and George Corn Tassel, three months dead and buried, lacked merit. Following the trial of Corn Tassel, Georgia began enforcing its emergency session laws, which led to the imprisonment of Samuel "The Messenger" Worcester. His case was appealed to the Supreme Court as Worcester v. Georgia in 1832.

== In popular culture ==
- In 1966, during the height of the Civil Rights Movement, Gainesville, Georgia, held its first annual crafts festival, named the Corn Tassel Festival. This name was used until 1993 when Georgia's illegal murder of Tassel was discovered again. The Gainesville Jaycees changed the name of the annual festival to Mule Camp Festival. This referred to the Cherokee trader outpost of the same name which developed as Gainesville.
