= Van Tassel =

Van Tassel or Van Tassell is a surname. Notable people with the surname include:

- George Van Tassel (1910–1978)
- Gilbert Van Tassel Hamilton (1877–1943)
- William Gilbert van Tassel Sutphen (1861–1945)
- Park Van Tassel (1853–1930)
- Marie Van Tassell (1871–1946)

Legendary characters with the surname include:

- Baltus Van Tassel, character in "The Legend of Sleepy Hollow"
- Katrina Van Tassel, romantic character in "The Legend of Sleepy Hollow"

== See also ==
- Van Tassell (disambiguation)
