= Dictum =

Statement made in a legal ruling

In legal writing, a dictum (Latin 'something that has been said'; plural dicta) is a statement made by a court. It may or may not be binding as a precedent.

== United States ==
In United States legal terminology, a dictum is a statement of opinion considered authoritative (although not binding), given the recognized authority of the person who pronounced it.

There are multiple subtypes of dicta, although due to their overlapping nature, legal practitioners in the U.S. colloquially use dictum to refer to any statement by a court the scope of which extends beyond the issue before the court. Dicta in this sense are not binding under the principle of stare decisis, but tend to have a strong persuasive effect, by virtue of having been stated in an authoritative decision, or by an authoritative judge, or both. These subtypes include:

- dictum proprium: A personal or individual dictum that is expressed by the judge who delivers an opinion but that is not necessarily concurred in by the whole court and that is not essential to the disposition of the case.
- gratis dictum: an assertion that a person makes without being obligated to do so, or a court's discussion of a point or question not raised by the record, or its suggestion of a rule not applicable in the case at bar.
- judicial dictum: an opinion by a court on a question that is directly involved, briefed, and argued by counsel, and even passed on by the court, but that is not essential to the decision.
- obiter dictum in Latin means 'something said in passing', and relates to a comment made while delivering a judicial opinion which is not necessary to the decision in the case and therefore not precedential (although it may be considered persuasive).
- simplex dictum: an unproved or dogmatic statement.

== England ==
In English law, a dictum is any statement made as part of a judgment of a court. Thus the term includes dicta stated incidentally, in passing (obiter dicta), that are not a necessary part of the rationale for the court's decision (referred to as the ratio decidendi). English lawyers do not, as a rule, categorise dicta more finely than into those that are obiter and those that are not.
