= Ejectment =

Common law term

Ejectment is a common law term for civil action to recover the possession of or title to land. It replaced the old real actions and the various possessory assizes (denoting county-based pleas to local sittings of the courts) where boundary disputes often featured. Though still used in some places, the term is now obsolete in many common law jurisdictions, in which possession and title are sued by the actions of eviction (also called possession proceedings) and quiet title (or injunctive and/or declaratory relief), respectively.

Originally, successful ejectment meant recovery of possession of land, for example against a defaulting tenant or a trespasser, who did not have (or once had but no longer does) any right to remain there. It has continued to be used for this, though in some jurisdictions the terminology has changed.

== Legal fiction ==
Over time, actions of ejectment were applied to try land claims in place of older real actions such as the assize of novel disseisin. A practice developed of trying the title to ownership of land by means of a special ejectment chiefly for ensuring a low court and had the added advantage of some confidentiality among the landed gentry.

The claimant granted (or so professed) a lease to a friend which had passed to a fictitious person (such as John Doe), who became the nominal plaintiff: the real claimant (plaintiff) was thereby the "lessor of the plaintiff". The action was vicarious. The action was brought against the real defendant or, more usually, for semi-secrecy and to ensure the low court, against another fictitious person (e.g. William Styles), in many papers termed the "casual ejector", who both sides' papers would state evicted the first fictitious tenant(s) by virtue of an (equally fictitious) lease granted by the real defendant. The title of the action would then be "Doe dem. [name of real claimant] v. [Defendant] or [fictitious counter-tenant]". E.g. Doe dem. John Hurrell Luscombe v Yates, Hawker, and Mudge (1822) 5 B. & Ald. 544 (England; 1822),

A letter was sent in the name of the casual ejector to the real defendant, inviting him to defend the case on behalf of his supposed tenant. The defendant's right to appear depended on the existence of the fictitious lease (an existence he would willingly assert or, failing to do, lose by default). This enabled the rights of the real parties to be litigated in a low court.

As explained by Maitland:

A claims land against X, why should he be compelled to say that he, A, demised the land to John Doe, who was ejected, and bring the action in John Doe's name---why should it not be enough, in an action of trespass, to say that A himself was ejected? The answer to that is I think this--if you are a freeholder claiming land you should bring a writ of entry, or a writ of right. If you, being freeholder, have been ejected, that is a disseisin, you should bring the assize of novel disseisin. The law has provided you with abundant remedies, both proprietary and possessory---you must use them. If to us it seems that such an answer as this is unsatisfactory we should try to look at the matter from X's point of view. Has he not, so to speak, a vested interest in the maintenance of the old procedure? You are proposing to use against him an action in which he may be imprisoned and outlawed, while, supposing that he is in the wrong, the law has provided other forms of action which do not permit this procedure against his person...

[A] dodge was discovered by which the action of ejectment (ejectione firmae) could be made generally available as a means of enabling any claimant to recover possession of land... You are in possession of land of which I say that I am the true owner, the tenant in fee simple. If this is correct I have as a general rule a right to enter... I do in fact enter and then and there make a lease for years to a third person, John Doe. John Doe stays on the land until ousted by you, and then brings the action, trespass in ejectment or, briefly, ejectment. To succeed in his action he must prove (1) my right to enter, (2) the lease, (3) his entry under the lease and (4) his ouster by you. When all this is proved he recovers his term with damages. Upon this form there is a variation. I put John Doe as tenant upon the land and he is ousted not by you but by a fourth person, William Stiles. Doe then has the action of ejectment against Stiles, but there is a rule that no plaintiff shall proceed in ejectment without notice being given to the person actually in possession and an opportunity being given him to appear as a defendant if he pleases. Where Doe sues Stiles, Stiles informs you of the action and you, if you do not want to see the land adjudged to Doe, defend the action in Stiles's stead. In the end my title as against you is put in issue in the action.

Such fictitious actions have been abolished in many jurisdictions as a result of the provision of alternative remedies.

== See also ==
- Estrepement
- Waste (law)
