= Connecticut Indian Land Claims Settlement =

Indian Land Claims Settlement

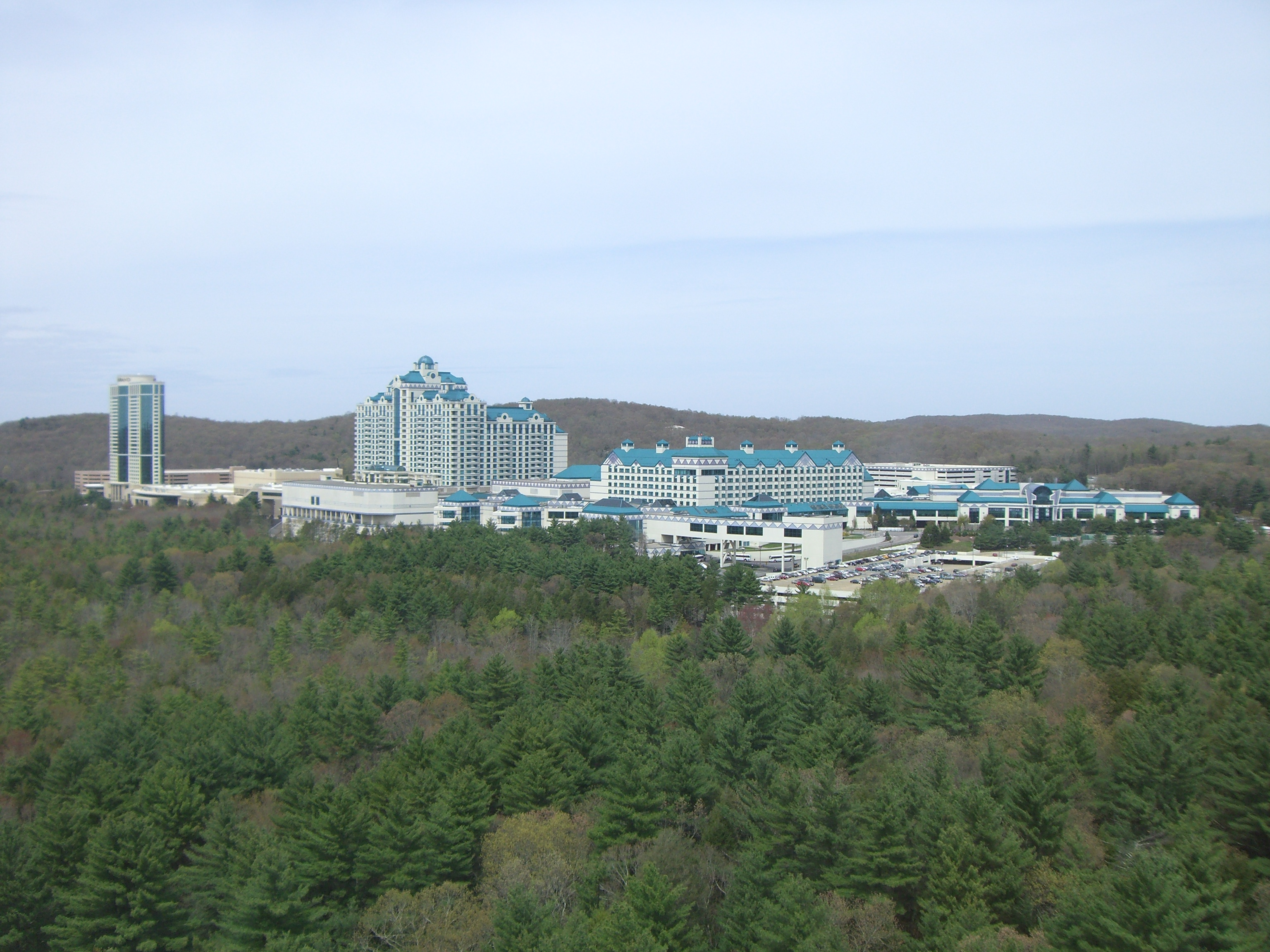
Foxwoods Resort Casino

The Connecticut Indian Land Claims Settlement was an Indian Land Claims Settlement passed by the United States Congress in 1983. The settlement act ended a lawsuit by the Mashantucket Pequot Tribe to recover 800 acres of their 1666 reservation in Ledyard, Connecticut. The state sold this property in 1855 without gaining ratification by the Senate. In a federal land claims suit, the Mashantucket Pequot charged that the sale was in violation of the Nonintercourse Act that regulates commerce between Native Americans and non-Indians.

The settlement act appropriated $900,000 to buy the disputed lands and transferred those lands and the state reservation in trust to the Department of Interior of the federal government. The settlement act permits the state of Connecticut to exercise civil and criminal, but not regulatory, jurisdiction over the lands. Gaining federal recognition and sovereign control of their land enabled the Mashantucket Pequot to develop gaming on their reservation, specifically, the Foxwoods Resort Casino. It is the largest casino in the world by revenue and floor space, and by 2007 was the most profitable. It has struggled financially in the second decade of the 21st century.

== Background ==
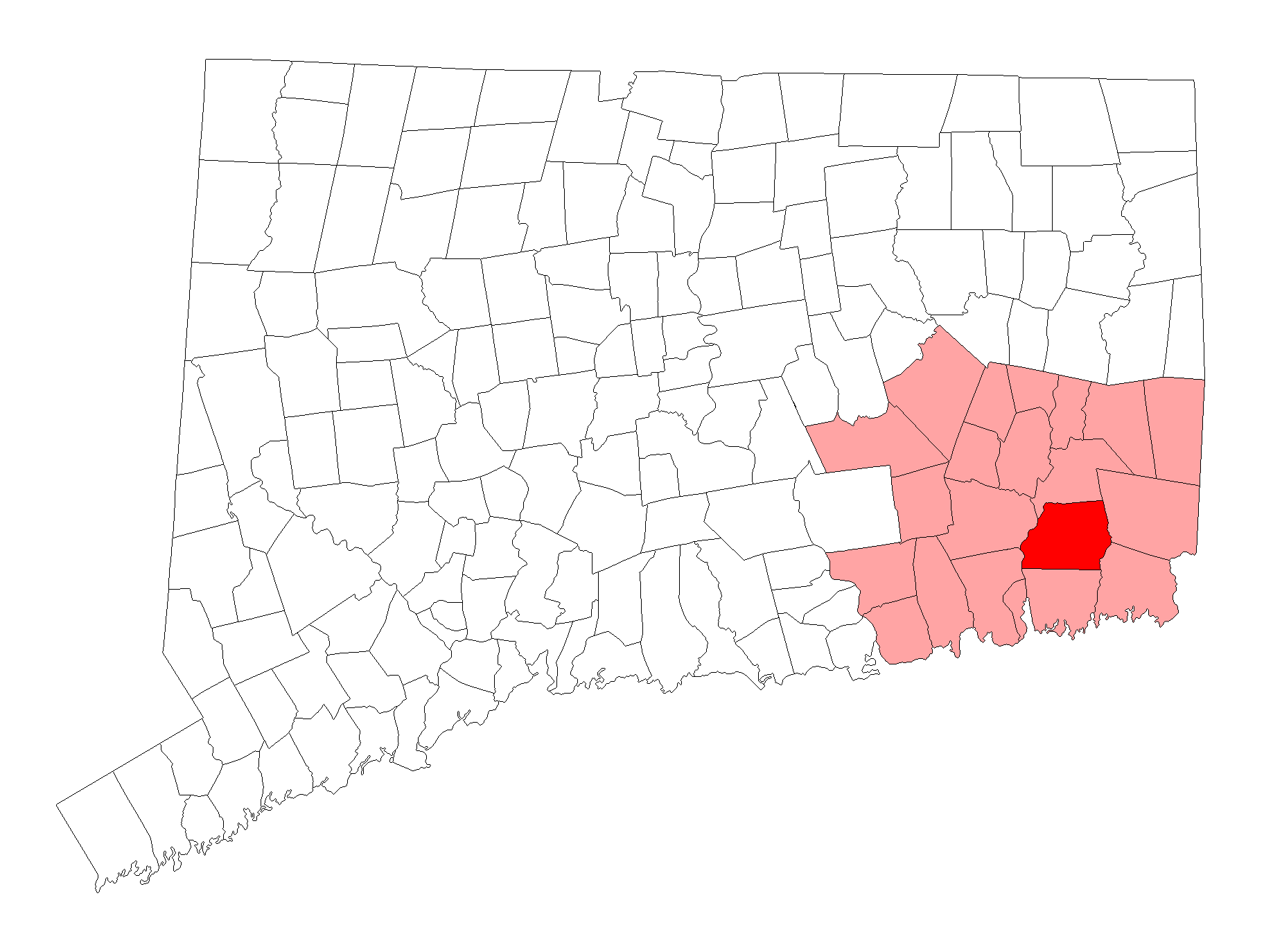
Ledyard, Connecticut

The Pequot War (1634–1638) all but exterminated the Pequot. The English colonists divided surviving captives, assigning them to their allies, the Mohegan and Narragansett tribes. In 1651, John Winthrop the Younger persuaded the Connecticut Colony to create a 500-acre reservation for the Pequot in Noank, removing them from their previous places of residence. In 1666, the Connecticut General Assembly voted to create a 2,000-acre reservation for the "western" Pequot (the group previously in the custody of the Mohegan) in Ledyard, Connecticut; the eastern Pequot were given 280 acres in present-day North Stonington, Connecticut. By 1790 (the year that Congress passed the first Nonintercourse Act), the Ledyard reservation had been reduced to 1,000 acres, due to sales by white supervisors. In 1855, Connecticut sold 800 of the remaining acres at $10/acre, putting the money into a state-administered trust account for the Pequot people.

In the 1970s, David Crosby of Pine Tree Legal Assistance, a non-profit law firm that was litigating Joint Tribal Council of the Passamaquoddy Tribe v. Morton in Maine, began to discuss a land claim by the Pequot people. As advised by Crosby, in 1974 the Pequot established a non-profit corporation—Western Pequot Indians of Connecticut, Inc. In April 1975, Crosby finished his research and presented his findings to the Pequot.

== Litigation ==
The Western Pequot of Connecticut filed suit in May 1976 in the United States District Court for the District of Connecticut. The case was assigned to Judge Mosher Joseph Blumenfeld. The named plaintiffs were the Western Pequot Tribe and its leader Richard "Skip" Hayward; among the named defendants were Holdridge Enterprises and its president, David Holdridge. The 800-acre claim included an estimated 12 to 35 private landowner defendants. The state of Connecticut was sued, and declined requests from the defendants to become involved in the litigation.

One of the lawyers for the defendants was Jackson King, a partner at Brown, Jacobson, Jewett & Laudone. King became involved in the case after being contacted by one of the named defendants, who had served with him on a local land conservation commission, contacted him. King had finished first in his class at University of Connecticut School of Law, and was well regarded.

== Federal recognition ==
HUD

The Pequot pursued federal recognition in parallel with their land claims litigation. They applied to the United States Department of Housing and Urban Development (HUD) to participate in HUD's Indian housing assistance program. In March 1976, Connecticut Governor Ella Grasso certified to HUD that the Pequots were "an autonomous unit or government" for the purposes of the revenue-sharing program. At this time, the tribe had 32 members.

BIA

On January 15, 1979, the Pequot filed a preliminary petition for federal tribal recognition with the Bureau of Indian Affairs (BIA). Historian Jack Campisi, who had previously worked as an expert witness with attorney Tom Tureen (known for his role in Joint Tribal Council of the Passamaquoddy Tribe v. Morton (1975) and other Nonintercourse Act claims), prepared the petition. The Pequot did not submit a full recognition application to the BIA until mid-1983.

== Settlement Act ==
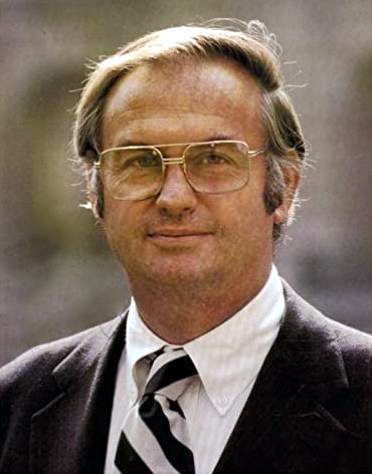
Senator Lowell P. Weicker Jr.,(R-CT), who introduced the Settlement Act, later as governor opposed development of the Foxwoods Casino and Resort.

Following Congressional passage of the Maine Indian Claims Settlement Act in 1980, attorney Tom Tureen turned his attention to the Mashantucket Pequot case.

In October 1981, Tureen approached King (the defendants' lawyer) regarding a federally legislated settlement. Tureen proposed that the state of Connecticut turn over the reservation to the federal government, and that the federal government pay the property owners fair market value to include their land in the federal reservation. As part of the deal, the state would retain civil and criminal, but not regulatory, authority of the reservation. The state approved the settlement in June 1982.

The federal settlement bill included a $900,000 appropriation, the appraisal value of the 800 acres, which the Pequot would use to buy the land from the landowner defendants. The legislation also provided that the landowners would not have to pay capital gains tax as long as they reinvested the money in real estate.

Senator Lowell P. Weicker Jr. (R-CT) delivered the draft bill to the Senate Select Committee on Indian Affairs. Peter Taylor, the committee's general counsel, noticed that the bill did not limit the amount or location of the lands that the Pequot could buy with the settlement funds. Tureen and King prepared a map in accordance with Taylor's wishes.

Senator William Cohen (R-ME), the chairman of the committee, began hearings on July 14, 1982. William Coldiron, the solicitor general of the Department of the Interior, testified against the bill, which he viewed as circumventing the BIA's recognition process and as costing too much money. Cohen criticized Coldiron for lacking enough knowledge about the Pequot. Representative Sam Gejdenson (D-CT) also supported the bill.

The House passed the bill, H.R. 6612, on October 1, 1982, and the Senate passed a different version on December 21. The compromise version was passed by the Senate on February 24, 1982 by voice vote, and by the House on March 22. However, President Ronald Reagan vetoed the bill, opining that the state should pay more of the cost and that the Pequot may not meet the BIA's definition of a tribe. Tureen, King, Hayward, and Sandy Cadwalader of the Indian Rights Association began lobbying for a veto override. Once 67 Senators had committed to voting for the bill—enough to have been the first veto override of Reagan's presidency—a compromise was proposed whereby Connecticut would contribute $200,000 toward road improvements (which became known as "the veto road").

At a new set of hearings in July 1983, Assistant Secretary for Indian Affairs John W. Fritz declared that the administration would not object to the new bill. Reagan signed the new bill, S. 1499, into law on October 18, 1983. Since 1983, the Mashuntucket Pequots have appeared on every list of federally recognized tribes published by the Department of the Interior in the Federal Register.

== Aftermath ==
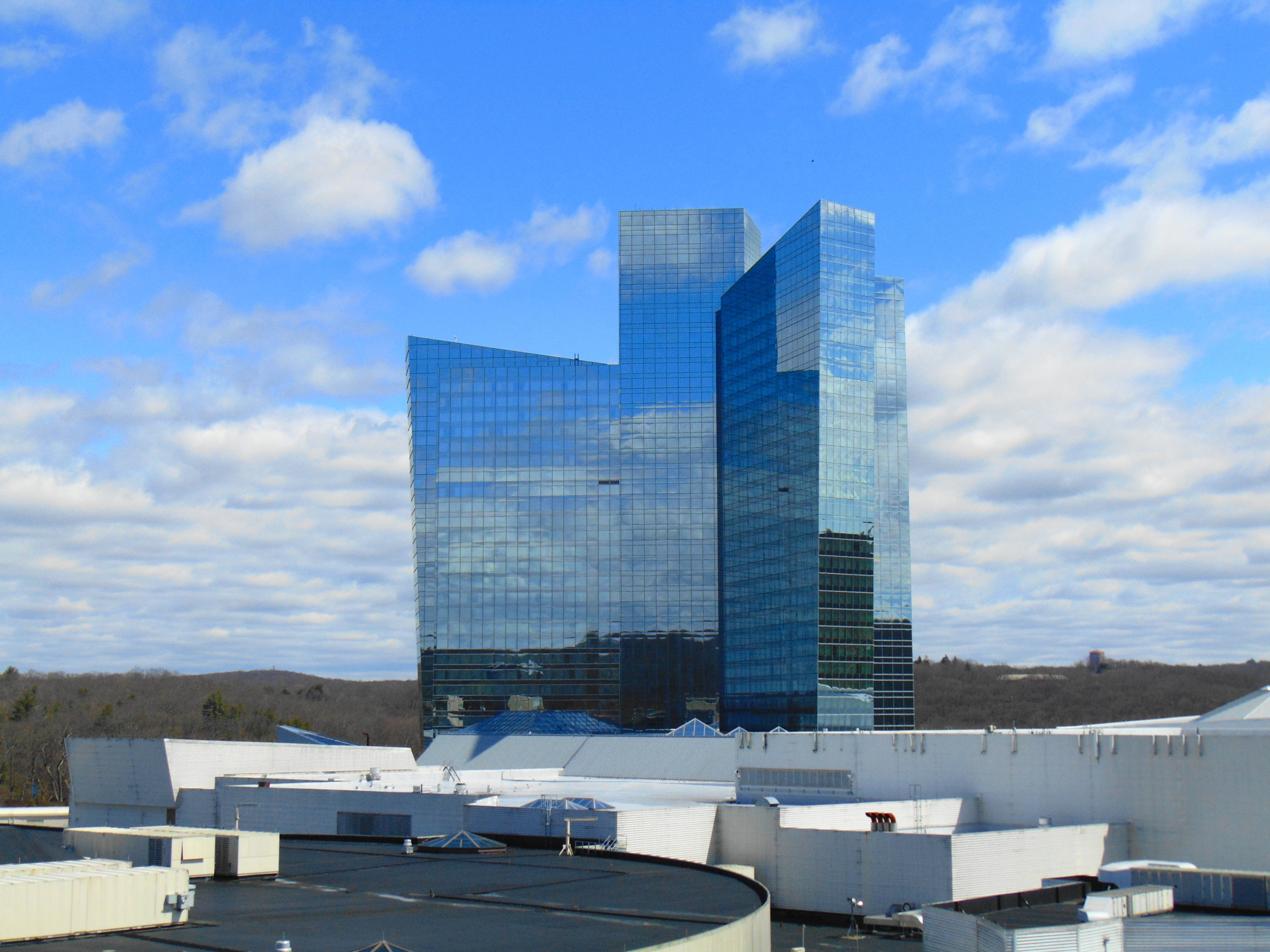
The Mohegan Sun was developed by the Mohegan Nation, after winning a similar settlement of an aboriginal title lawsuit and gaining federal recognition in 1994.

=== Bingo ===
On April 30, 1984, the Pequot corporate body voted 12-1, with two abstentions, to approve construction of a high-stakes bingo operation on their reservation. Barry Margolin, Tureen's law partner, took the lead in representing the Pequot in this matter. After Connecticut's chief state criminal attorney wrote the tribe a letter threatening to shut down the bingo operation if opened as planned, the Pequot filed for a federal preliminary injunction. Judge Peter C. Dorsey (who, as a magistrate, had ruled favorably for the Pequot in their land claim) granted the injunction. Dorsey granted a permanent injunction on January 9, 1986, holding that Connecticut's bingo laws did not apply to the reservation. The bingo hall opened on July 5, 1986.

=== Cabazon Band and the IGRA ===
The Supreme Court's ruling in California v. Cabazon Band of Mission Indians (1987), which upheld the right of the tribe to develop a gaming casino on their reservation, was a catalyst to the Pequot's ambition to upgrade their bingo hall and develop a gaming casino.

In the wake of the Supreme Court decision, Congress passed the Indian Gaming Regulatory Act (IGRA) on October 17, 1988. Tureen and Margolin concluded that the IGRA required Connecticut to negotiate a tribal-state compact with the Pequot in good faith because of a state statute that permitted non-profits, with a state license, to hold "Las Vegas nights" twice a year. The state statute in question had been lobbied for by Mothers Against Drunk Driving (MADD) in 1987. At the request of Governor William O'Neill, acting state attorney general Clarine Riddle prepared a memorandum highlighting the differences between high school students playing casino games for monopoly money and a full-scale, for-profit casino. O'Neill denied the Pequot's request.

=== Development of Foxwoods ===
When the state failed to negotiate, on November 3, 1989, the tribe sued the state under a provision of the IGRA— that permitted such suits if state did not negotiate in good faith within 180 days. (This part of IGRA was subsequently declared unconstitutional by the US Supreme Court in Seminole Tribe v. Florida (1996.) The case was docketed again before Judge Dorsey. Dorsey granted the tribe summary judgment in May 1990, ordering the state to resume negotiations and conclude a compact within 60 days.

The Second Circuit upheld Dorsey's ruling on September 4, 1990. The compact was forwarded to Secretary of Interior Manuel Lujan Jr. in October 1990 for his approval. On April 22, 1991, the Supreme Court declined to grant certiorari to the state's appeal from the Second Circuit's ruling.

Former Senator Weicker replaced O'Neil as governor in January 1991. Weicker was opposed to gambling, and was advised that repealing the "Las Vegas night" statute was the only way to avoid a Pequot casino. Moreover, Weicker would have had to repeal the law before Secretary Lujan gave final approval to the compact. The Mashantucket Pequot retained lobbyists, reached out to charity groups that used the "Las Vegas night" statute, and brought in Native American Rights Fund executive director John Echohawk to defeat Weicker's proposed bill. Weicker's bill prevailed by 18-17 with one absent in the Connecticut Senate. However, the House rejected the bill by more than 20 votes. Secretary Lujan approved the compact on May 31, 1991.

The Pequot signed a financing agreement with Malaysian partners on February 25, 1991 for the construction of Foxwoods Resort Casino. Foxwoods opened on February 12, 1992. That year, even though slot machines had yet to be installed, the 245-member Pequot tribe earned $148 million in revenue and $51 million in profit from Foxwoods. Threatened with the possibility of competition from non-Indian gambling, the Pequot offered the state a share of slot machine revenue in October 1992 (the issue of slot machines had been left for the courts in the original compact). A provision of the agreement provided that if slot machine gambling were to be legalized in the state, the revenue sharing would cease. On January 13, 1993, the tribe and state announced a deal that would give the state 25% of gross slot machine revenue, guaranteeing at least $100M/year. By 1998, Foxwoods was generating $1 billion in revenue and $152 million in net income for the tribe.

=== Reservation expansion ===
Starting in 1993, the Pequot began negotiations to purchase additional lands and convey those lands to the Department of Interior in trust under the Indian Reorganization Act of 1934. Local towns sued the tribes to prevent this. In 1996 and 1998, the Interior Department, under Secretary Bruce Babbitt, approved the tribe's request to put 165 new acres (0.67 km^{2}) and 146 new acres (0.59 km^{2}), respectively, into trust. The Supreme Court's decision in Carcieri v. Salazar (2009) prevents any further such transfers.
