= The Aroostook Indian =

American newspaper

The Aroostook Indian was a newsletter published between 1969 and 1976 at Ricker College in Houlton, Maine. It was created by the Association of Aroostook Indians (AAI) to unite Maliseet and Micmac Indians living both on and off-reservation in the northern part of the state. The newsletter allowed for widespread announcements among the Indians of Aroostook County. It exemplified the measures the AAI were going through in order to unite those from the Maliseet and Micmac tribes. Community members, often from as far away as Boston, contributed short stories, announcements, recipes, poems, and other small pieces.

== Background ==
The newsletter was edited by AAI board members. They mobilized around the time the Maliseet and Micmac Tribes were seeking federal recognition. During that period Native American people living in northern Maine faced extreme poverty; Terrance Polchies and Tom Battiste, leaders of the AAI, were said to have been the first two Native American people to have graduated from high school. In The Aroostook Indian's first issue, Polchies called upon "Indians in Aroostook to unite and work together, because as a group we will be stronger and more easily heard". The newsletter united the two tribes as they banded together to gain the respect and tribal accreditation they sought out for. However, the Maliseets received recognition far earlier, in 1980 under the Maine Indian Claims Settlement Act, whereas the Micmacs received federal recognition in 1991, with the passage of the Aroostook Band of Micmacs Settlement Act. As a result of these recognitions at separate times, the once united Maliseet and Micmac tribes have become divided.

== Newsletter content ==
The writers were showing their appreciation for their culture and their embrace of improving widespread growth of the tribal traditions. They also brought up more serious topics like the rights of Indians and the language and historical culture of the tribes. Education and building schools for children were an important aspect of what was included of the newsletter because they were trying to improve their way of reservation life. This contributed to other aspects of the newsletter because they would bring up topics like education of the tribal language and their cultural history that seemed to be becoming unknown even to those within the tribe. It discussed the issues of welfare and unemployment as well as discrimination amongst the native peoples. The newsletter also offered the Aroostook County tribes a way of announcing meetings and events, as well as births and happy birthdays.

== See also ==
- Aroostook Band of Micmac
- Houlton Band of Maliseet Indians
