= Richard Arthur Hayward =

Native American tribal leader from Connecticut

- Born: November 28, 1947 (age 78); New London, Connecticut
- Other name: Skip Hayward
- Citizenship: Mashantucket Pequot Indian Tribe, American
- Occupations: tribal leader, pipefitter, restauranteur
- Organization: Mashantucket Pequot Indian Tribe
- Known for: helping Mashantucket Pequot Indian Tribe gain federal recognition, founding Foxwoods Casino
- Title: Tribal Chairman
- Term: 1975–1998
- Predecessor: none
- Successor: Kenneth M. Reels
- Spouse: Aline Champoux (1969-1976) Cindy Figdore
- Parents: Richard Hayward Sr. (father); Theresa Victoria Plouffe (mother)
- Relatives: Elizabeth George Plouffe (grandmother)
- Family: Theresa Darnice Bell, née Hayward (sister) Robert Dale Hayward (brother)

Richard "Skip" Arthur Hayward (born November 28, 1947), served as tribal chairman of the Mashantucket Pequot Indian Tribe from 1975 until November 1, 1998.

Kenneth M. Reels succeeded him as chairman.

== Early life and education ==
Hayward was born on November 28, 1947, in New London, Connecticut, the eldest of 9 children. Hayward's father was a Navy Medical Corpsman who traced his ancestry back to the Mayflower. The family moved frequently between naval bases. By 1969, Hayward was working as an apprentice pipefitter at General Dynamics Electric Boat. He settled in Mystic, Connecticut, where he worked as a milk deliveryman and ran a clam shack called the Sea Mist Haven near the Mystic Seaport.

== Tribal recognition and land claims ==
Hayward's grandmother Elizabeth George Plouffe was the last member of the Pequot Indian tribe living on the 214-acre (87 ha) Western Pequot Reservation in Ledyard, Connecticut. Her health declining, she asked Hayward to move onto and care for the land in February 1973. Planning to expand his restaurant business, Hayward declined, and Plouffe died on June 7, 1973. Uninhabited, the land passed back to the state of Connecticut. Hoping to stake a claim to plots on the land, Hayward and 16 of his relatives founded the corporation Western Pequot Indians of Connecticut Inc. on August 18, 1974. Hayward's uncle Amos George was chosen as "president of the board of directors" and representative to the Connecticut Indian Affairs Council. His lease expired, Hayward bought a camper and moved to Laurel, Maryland, where he planned to become a pastor, and then to Sparta, Missouri. In 1975, Hayward decided to fully commit to the reservation, and moved back to Stonington, Connecticut. He was rehired at General Dynamics making $229 per week.

In April 1975, Hayward visited the Passamaquoddy reservation in Washington County, Maine, where lawyer Thomas Tureen was preparing a land claims lawsuit against the state of Maine. Hayward and his sister Theresa met with Tureen, the head of the Coalition of Eastern Native Americans (CENA), who helped him begin a similar claim for the Pequots against the state of Connecticut. Hayward knew snippets of oral history from Plouffe, but was unfamiliar with the broader history of the Pequot War. Tureen worried Hayward's link to the historical tribe was too thin, and that representing the Pequots would jeopardize the credibility of other tribes' cases. Requirements for tribal identity had been lain out in 1901 in Montoya v. United States. Another client, the Mashpee Wampanoag, had a strong tribal identity, but had recently lost their case because the state of Massachusetts no longer recognized them as a tribe. However, Connecticut still recognized the Pequots.

Hayward urged his distant family to move onto the reservation. On August 10, 1975, he convened another meeting and was unanimously elected as chairman, but was referred to as "chief". The Pequots established a Tribal Council and ratified a six-page constitution, which included provisions about expanding the land base. Notably, the constitution did not require a blood quantum. To distinguish from the Eastern Pequots, Mashantucket (or Mushintuxit) was added to the tribe name, meaning "much wooded-land" in the Pequot language. Hayward launched multiple start-up businesses on the reservation, including producing maple syrup. In March 1976, Hayward testified to a task force of the American Indian Policy Review Commission in Boston, Massachusetts. He gave an impassioned speech about the injustice of arbitrary dealings with unrecognized tribes, notably stating, “I resent the implication that I am a second-class Indian.” Later that year, Connecticut Governor Ella Grasso granted state tribal recognition to the Mashantucket Pequots.

Next, Tureen and Hayward discussed obtaining federal recognition from the federal government. In 1978, Hayward formed a Pequot housing authority to apply for housing subsidies, the first tribal housing authority in the state of Connecticut In 1979, Hayward and the Pequots received a $12,000 grant from the Department of Housing and Urban Development (HUD) to create an economic development plan for the reservation. They also received $45,000 from the Catholic Campaign for Human Development, and a $1.2 million loan from HUD for the construction of 15 single-family homes. Hayward appointed his cousin John Holder as executive director of the housing project. Hayward began raising swine and growing hydroponic lettuce on the reservation, but the businesses failed. Instead, Hayward received backing from the Indian Rights Association to fund genealogical research. He received an employment grant from the Comprehensive Employment and Training Act (CETA) program to hire a receptionist.

On January 15, 1979, the Pequots submitted a preliminary petition to the Bureau of Indian Affairs (BIA) for tribal recognition. However, because of the slow BIA bureaucracy, a lack of historical evidence tying the Pequots to their reservation, Tureen elected to seek an out-of-court settlement instead. Tureen modeled his plan on the Passamaquoddy's settlement from October 1980, whom the state of Maine had award $80.6 million to repurchase disputed land. In October 1981, Tureen and Hayward met with Jackson King, a lawyer who represented landowners in Ledyard. They assured King the settlement deal would provide generous funds for the purchase of his clients' land. The Mashantucket Pequot Settlement Act was approved by the Senate in February 1983.

President Reagan vetoed the bill, however, stating that it would set a dangerous precedent for creating other new tribes, but Senator Lowell Weicker began to lobby against the President. He raised Congressional supporters who threatened to override the veto, so President Reagan compromised. On October 18, 1983, the Connecticut Indian Land Claims Settlement Act was signed into law. The tribe was awarded $900,000 with which to repurchase over 1,000 acres of land.

== Gaming ==
Before finalizing the terms of the settlement bill, Tureen and Hayward ensured it would permit the Pequots to operate high-stakes gambling operations with minimal oversight.

Hayward and Tureen started planning a high-stakes bingo operation. To run the enterprise, Hayward recruited Howard Wilson, a member of the Penobscot tribe and a veteran bingo operator. The bingo hall opened on July 5, 1986, and was generating as much as $30 million a year in revenues by 1988.

After the Indian Gaming Regulatory Act (IGRA) was passed in 1988, Hayward and Tureen saw that a casino situated on the Mashantucket reservation would be a highly profitable enterprise. Back by the Malaysian Genting Group, and Foxwoods Resort Casino began its business in 1992. By 1998, Foxwoods was generating more than $1 billion dollars in revenue, and Hayward was a multimillionaire. The Mashantucket Pequot Indian Tribe grew from 125 people when Hayward organized the Western Pequots, to more than 300 in 1996.

== Succession ==
On November 1, 1998, Hayward lost the election for tribal chairman to Kenneth "Kenny" Reels, his distant cousin. Hayward had been chairman of the tribe for over 20 years. He ran for the position of tribal chairman again in 2002 but lost to Michael J. Thomas.

== Personal life ==
Hayward married Aline Aurore Champoux of Coventry, Rhode Island on June 25, 1969 They divorced in September 1976.

Hayward married Cindy Figdore of North Stonington, Connecticut on September 20, 1980. They met while Figdore was working as a waitress at the restaurant Mr. Pizza, nearby the reservation.

After exiting tribal politics, Hayward has kept out of the public eye. In 2019, Hayward appeared was interviewed for a documentary about Elizabeth George Plouffe and Martha Langevin by the Connecticut Women's Hall of Fame.

== Honors ==
In 1994, the University of Connecticut awarded Hayward with an honorary degree. In September 2016, Hayward was inducted into the Gaming Hall of Fame. In August 2017, the tribe gave Hayward its first Lifetime Achievement Award for Foxwoods' 25th anniversary. In November 2024, Hayward received the Joyce Olson Resnikoff Tourism Legacy Award from the Greater Mystic Chamber of Commerce.

== Notes ==
Preceded by None	Chairman of Mashantucket Pequot Tribe; 1975–1998	Succeeded by Kenneth M. Reels
