= Indian Land Claims Settlements =

Settlements of Native American land claims by Acts of the US Congress

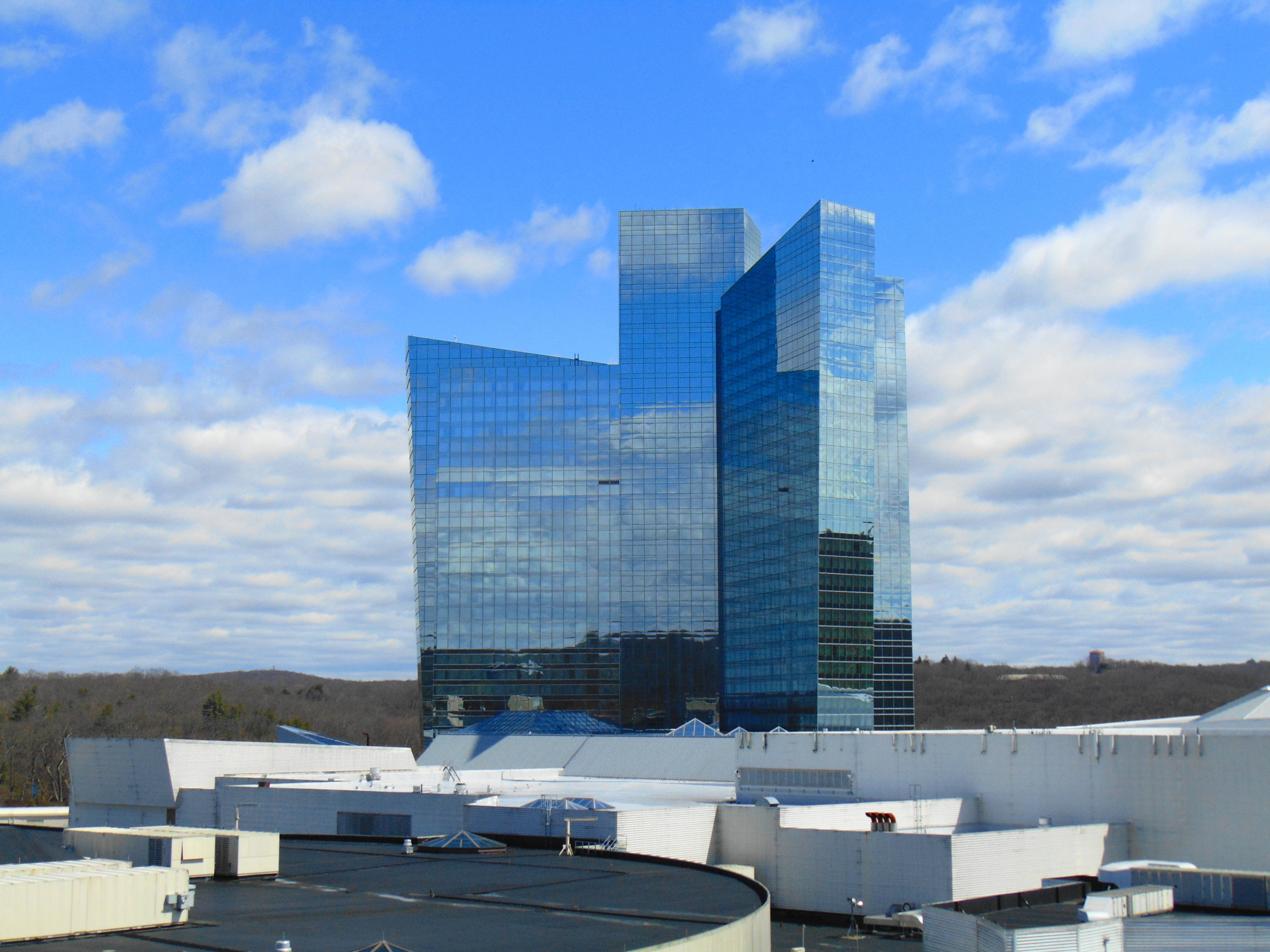
The Mohegan Sun, developed on land taken in trust for the Mohegan as a product of settlement

Indian Land Claims Settlements are settlements of Native American land claims by the United States Congress, codified in 25 U.S.C. ch. 19.

In several instances, these settlements ended live claims of aboriginal title in the United States. The first two—the Rhode Island Claims Settlement Act and the Maine Indian Claims Settlement Act—extinguished all aboriginal title in Rhode Island and Maine, respectively, following initial court rulings in the tribes' favor.

The Mohegan Nation (Connecticut) Land Claims Settlement of 1994 also followed a judicial ruling in favor of a tribe, but did not extinguish all aboriginal title in the state. Other tribes had pending land claims.

The Passamaquoddy (1975), Narragansett I and II (1976), and Mohegan (1980, 1982) cases occurred in the U.S. Supreme Court's Oneida I (1974) decision, which held that there was federal subject-matter jurisdiction for such claims.

The Florida Indian (Miccosukee) Land Claims Settlement and Florida Indian (Seminole) Land Claims Settlement relate to water rights in the Everglades.

In Canada, these settlements involve First Nations.

== List of settlements ==
Act	Passed	Tribe	Preceding litigation	Subject matter	Monetary compensation
Rhode Island Claims Settlement Act	Sept. 30, 1978	Narragansett	Narragansett Tribe of Indians v. S. R.I. Land Dev. Co., 418 F. Supp. 798 (D.R.I. 1976); Narragansett Tribe of Indians v. Murphy, 426 F. Supp. 132 (D.R.I. 1976)	Aboriginal title	$3,500,000
Maine Indian Claims Settlement Act [modified by Houlton Band of Maliseet Indians Supplementary Claims Settlement Act and Aroostock Band of Micmacs Settlement Act]	Oct. 10, 1980	Passamaquoddy, Penobscot, and Maliseet	Joint Tribal Council of the Passamaquoddy Tribe v. Morton, 388 F. Supp. 649 (D. Me. 1975), aff'd, 528 F.2d 370 (1st Cir. 1975)	Aboriginal title	$81,500,000
Florida Indian (Miccosukee) Land Claims Settlement	Dec. 31, 1982	Miccosukee	Miccosukee Tribe of Indians of Florida v. Florida, No. 79-cv-253 (S.D. Fl.)	Water rights	None
Connecticut Indian Land Claims Settlement	Oct. 18, 1983	Mashantucket Pequot Tribe	W. Pequot Tribe of Indians v. Holdridge Enters., Inc., No. H76-cv-193 (D. Conn.)	Aboriginal title	$900,000
Houlton Band of Maliseet Indians Supplementary Claims Settlement Act [modifying the Maine Indian Claims Settlement Act]	Oct. 27, 1986	Maliseet	N/A	Aboriginal title	$200,000
Massachusetts Indian Land Claims Settlement	Aug. 18, 1987	Wampanoag	Wampanoag Tribal Council of Gay Head v. Town of Gay Head, No. 74-cv-5826 (D. Mass.)	Aboriginal title	$4,500,000
Florida Indian (Seminole) Land Claims Settlement	Dec. 31, 1987	Seminole	Seminole Tribe of Indians of Florida v. Florida, No. 78-cv-6116 (S.D. Fla.)	Water rights	None
Puyallup Tribe of Indians Settlement Act of 1989	June 21, 1989	Puyallup	Excludes land from settlement in: Puyallup Tribe of Indians v. Port of Tacoma, 717 F.2d 1251 (9th Cir. 1983)	Aboriginal title	$162,000,000
Seneca Nation (New York) Land Claims Settlement	Nov. 3, 1990	Seneca	18 Stat. 330; 26 Stat. 558; Seneca Nation of Indians v. United States, 39 Ind. Cl. Comm. 355 (1977)	Retroactive federal approval of leases and previous inadequate settlement	$60,000,000
Aroostock Band of Micmacs Settlement Act [modifying Maine Indian Land Claims Settlement]	Nov. 26, 1991	Micmacs	N/A	Aboriginal title	$900,000
Mohegan Nation (Connecticut) Land Claims Settlement	Oct. 19, 1994	Mohegan people	Mohegan Tribe v. Connecticut, 483 F. Supp. 597 (D. Conn. 1980), aff'd, 638 F.2d 612 (2d Cir. 1980), cert. denied, 452 U.S. 968 (1981), on remand, 528 F. Supp. 1359 (D. Conn. 1982)	Aboriginal title	None
Crow Boundary Settlement	Nov. 2, 1994	Crow		Indian reservation boundary surveying error	$35,000,000
Santo Domingo Pueblo Claims Settlement	Nov. 1, 2000	Pueblo	United States v. Thompson, 941 F.2d 1074 (10th Cir. 1991); Pueblo of Santo Domingo v. Rael, Civil No. 83-1888 (D. N.M.)	Aboriginal title	$23,000,000
Torres-Martinez Desert Cahiilla Indian Claims Settlement	Dec. 27, 2000	Torres-Martinez Desert Cahuilla Indians	United States ex rel. Torres-Martinez Band of Mission Indians v. Imperial Irrigation Dist., No. 82-cv-1790 (S.D. Cal.), Nos. 93-cv-55389, 93-cv-55398, and 93-cv-55402, No. 92-cv-55129 (9th Cir.); Torres-Martinez Desert Cahuilla Indians v. Imperial Irrigation Dist., No. 91-cv-1670 (S.D. Cal.)	Indian reservation flooding	$14,200,000
Cherokee, Choctaw, and Chickasaw Nation Claims Settlement	Dec. 13, 2002	Cherokee, Choctaw, Chickasaw	(Ct. Cl.); United States v. Cherokee Nation, 480 U.S. 700 (1987), Nos. 218-cv-89L and 630-cv-89L (Ct. Cl. 1989); (E.D. Ok. 1997); excluding Choctaw Nation v. Oklahoma, 397 U.S. 620 (1970)	Mismanagement of tribal resources	$40,000,000
Pueblo De San Ildefonso Claims Settlement	Sept. 27, 2006	Pueblo	Pueblo of San Ildefonso v. United States, No. 660-87L (Ct. Cl.); prior history: United States v. Pueblo of San Ildefonso, 513 F.2d 1383 (Ct. Cl. 1975); Pueblo of San Ildefonso v. United States, 35 Fed. Cl. 777 (1996)	Aboriginal title, inter alia	$6,900,000

== Other compensated extinguishments in the US ==
- Decisions of the Indian Claims Commission
- Alaska Native Claims Settlement Act (ANCSA)
- South Carolina v. Catawba Indian Tribe, 476 U.S. 498 (1986): settled for $50,000,000 by the Catawba Indian Tribe of South Carolina Land Claims Settlement Act of 1993, Pub. L. No. 103-116, 107 Stat 1118 (codified at 25 U.S.C. § 941)

== See also ==
Australia

- National Native Title Tribunal (NNTT)

Canada

- Nunavut Land Claims Agreement
- Sahtu Dene and Metis Comprehensive Land Claim Agreement
- Yukon Land Claims

New Zealand

- Treaty of Waitangi claims and settlements
