= Narragansett land claim =

Litigation of aboriginal title in Rhode Island, US

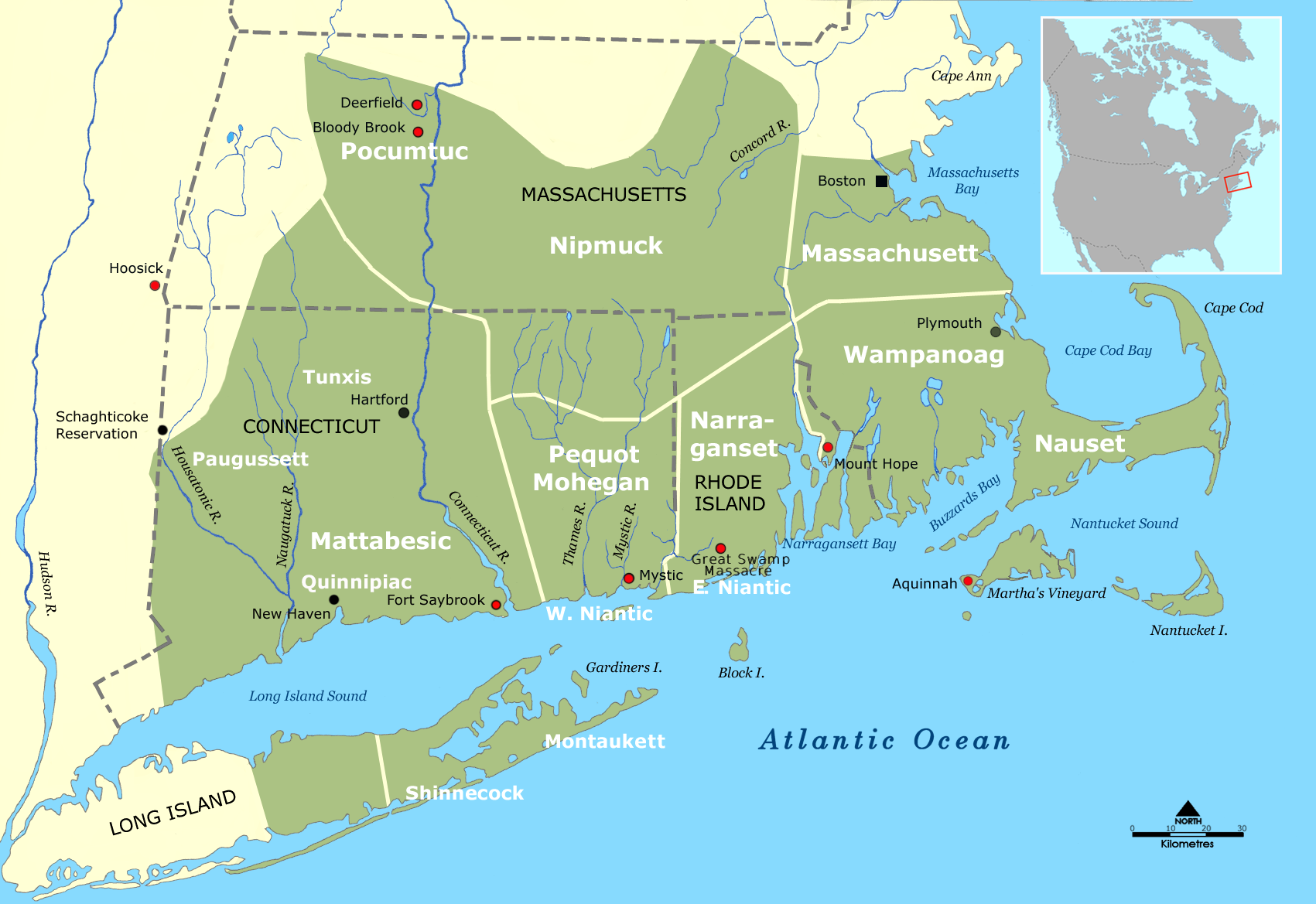
Narragansett territory c. 1600

The Narragansett land claim was one of the first litigations of aboriginal title in the United States in the wake of the U.S. Supreme Court's landmark Oneida Indian Nation of New York v. County of Oneida (1974), or Oneida I, decision. The Narragansett claimed a few thousand acres of land in and around Charlestown, Rhode Island, challenging a variety of early 19th century land transfers as violations of the Nonintercourse Act, suing both the state and private land owners.

Judge Raymond James Pettine of the United States District Court for the District of Rhode Island granted the Narragansett's motion to strike the state's affirmative defenses and denied the state's necessary party motion and motion to dismiss. Altogether, the court rejected the state's defenses of: sovereign immunity, laches, statute of limitations/adverse possession, estoppel by sale, operation of state law, and public policy.

After the decision, Congress settled the claim with the Rhode Island Claims Settlement Act (RICSA), the first of many Indian Land Claims Settlements, extinguishing all aboriginal title in Rhode Island in exchange for $3.5 million. The Narragansett claim was "the first of the eastern land claims to be settled." The Narragansett received federal recognition in 1983 and have unsuccessfully attempted to establish a Native American gaming enterprise.

== Background ==
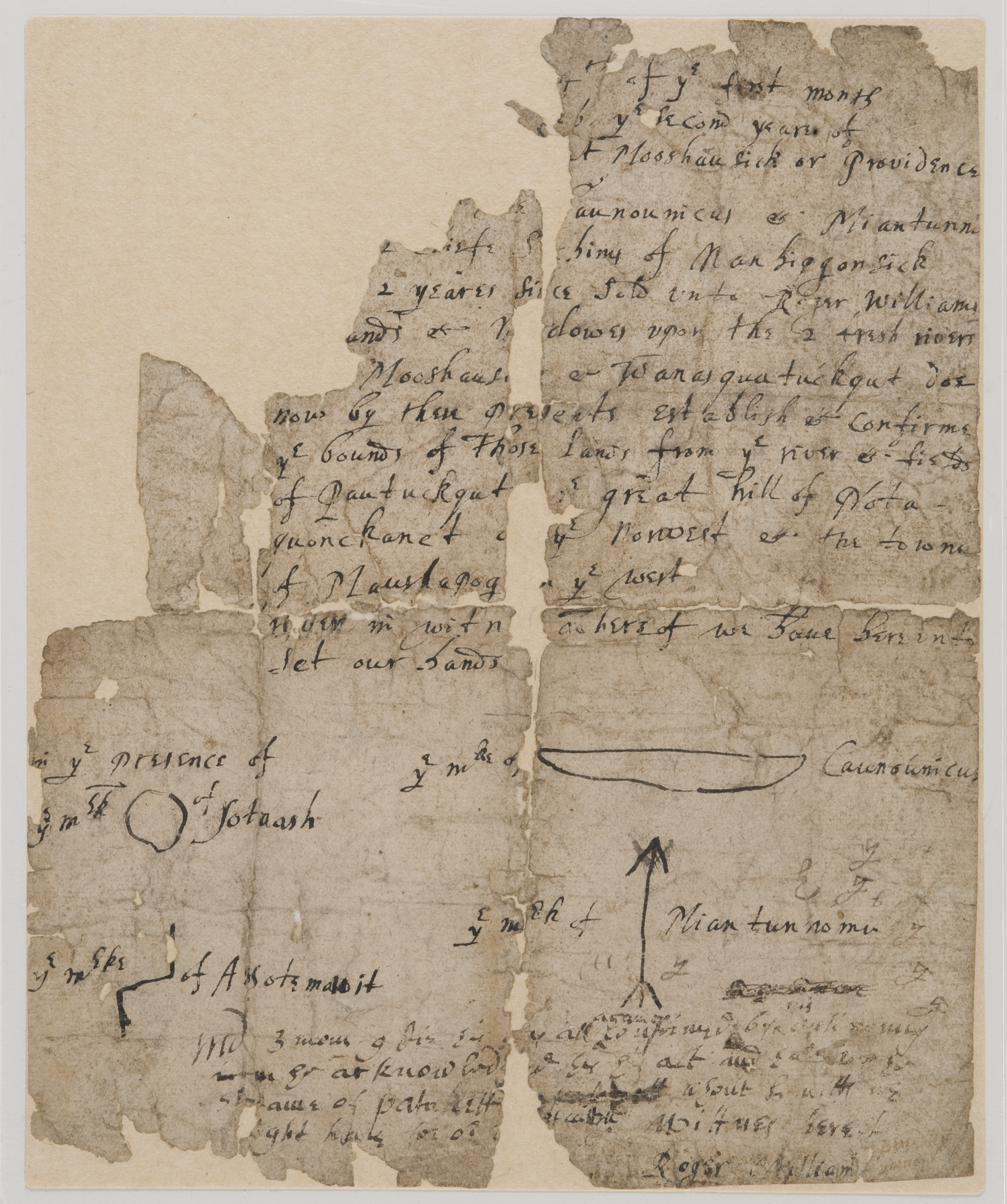
A document commemorating a 1636 conveyance of land from the Narragansett tribe to Roger Williams

The Narragansett tribe was "one of the most powerful tribes in New England" before settlers arrived in Rhode Island. The tribe was defeated in King Philip's War in 1675. The Rhode Island legislature passed a "detribalization" law in 1880.

=== In re Narragansett Indians (R.I. 1898) ===
The Rhode Island Senate asked the Rhode Island Supreme Court to issue an advisory opinion on the law's constitutionality; the opinion summarizes much of the tribe's land and other dealings with the state up until that point. Additionally, the Senate certified the questions of: whether certain quitclaim deeds executed by the tribe were valid; whether the state could acquire valid title under the 1880 law; whether the tribe was abolished by the law; and whether those to whom the state conveyed title under the 1880 law had valid title. The court upheld the statute and answered all the questions in the affirmative.

The court began with an attack upon the Narragansett's status as indigenous:

The people in Rhode Island, in our day, calling themselves Narragansetts, are, properly speaking, not Narragansetts at all, but, at best, only a decayed remnant of the Niantics, a tribe tributary to the Narragansetts, with whom the survivors of the latter took refuge after the Great Swamp Fight; the less celebrated tribe adopting and being known thenceforward by the more famous name of their once powerful neighbors, the Narragansetts.

Next, the court reviewed the power of a sachem to conclude a land conveyance, remarking that they exercised "absolute monarchie over the people." The court next quoted extensively from Chief Justice John Marshall's opinion in Johnson v. McIntosh (1823). By comparison, the court claims, Roger Williams "denied the justice of the white man's laws as to Indian lands [which] very largely ignored the right of the Indian." The court quoted with approval Williams' claim that the land of Rhode Island was not "purchased or obtained" but rather obtained from "Cannonicus but by gift." Only out of a desire to avoid conflicts with neighboring colonies, the court proceeds, did Williams obtain a royal charter for Rhode Island in 1643 or 1644.

==== Exemplifying Roger Williams ====
The court next reviews a 1644 document by which the Naragansett's purported to "submit, subject, and give over ourselves, peoples, lands, rights, inheritances, and possessions whatsoever, in ourselves and our heires successively forever, unto the protection, care and government" of the King of England. The court did not claim this document affected the Narragansett's land title. The court reviews the text of the royal charter, rebutting the argument that the charter was "evidence that the crown recognized the Indian title as paramount to their own."

The court details the opposition of Williams and Rhode Island to the 1659 Atherton purchase from the Narragansett (through the sachem Coginaquand) by settlers from Connecticut. The same group of settlers in September 1660 demanded and received another tract from the Narragansett's as punishment from some "injuries alleged." The Atherton purchase was re-recited in 1662. A 40-year dispute between Rhode Island and Connecticut followed over whose territory (and royal charter) included the Narragansett lands. Due to the expenses of this dispute, the opinion claims, the Rhode Island legislature in 1707 authorized a survey to identify vacant Naraggansett lands. In 1709, Rhode Island obtained some sort of conveyance to nearly all the vacant lands, which were within the area claimed by Connecticut.

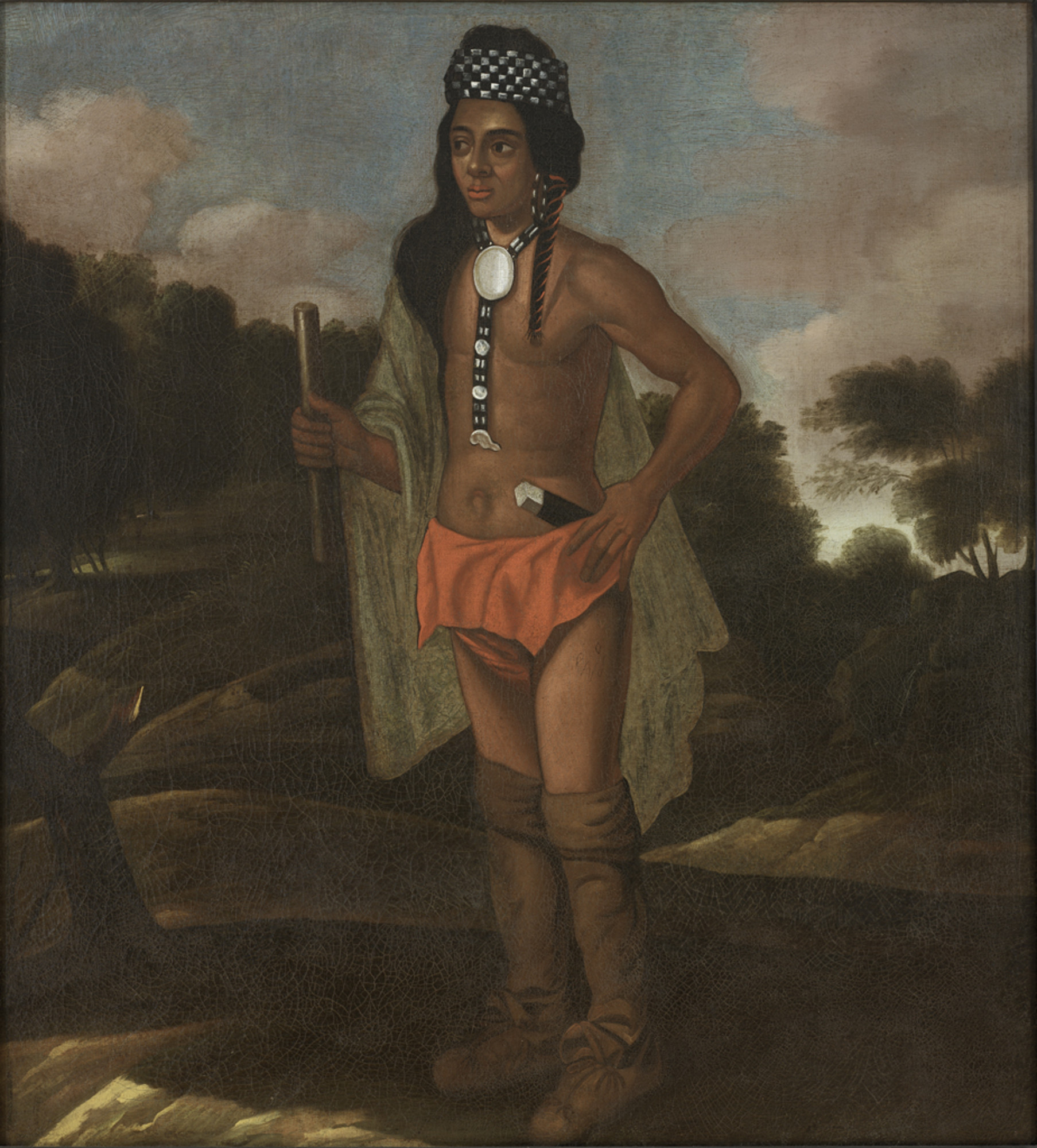
Ninigret, sachem of the Niantics

The opinion next reviews the Rhode Island statutes which prohibited the acquisition of Indian lands without the consent of the colony. Two such ratifications occurred in 1659 and 1682. From 1713 to 1773, a variety of legislation was passed regarding the lands of Ninigret. Due to the succession disputes following Ninigret's death, the legislature modified the prohibition to require the approval of a certain tribal counsel and a committee of the legislature in 1779. Controversial conveyances occurred in 1800, 1803, 1811, 1813, and 1818—plus "many others." From 1718 to 1840 various laws were passed exempting the Narragansett's from various forms of taxation, barring most suits against Narragansetts, and so on. In 1840 an Indian commission was appointed whose responsibilities included overseeing further conveyances of land. According to the court:

The hold of the Narragansetts, even in civil matters, grew more and more feeble, and they gradually became more and more dependent upon the state, until their moribund condition as a tribe became apparent even to themselves. ... For at least 30 years before the passage of [the 1880 law under review], it was apparent that the Narragansett tribe had become extinct in all but name. Its members had even ceased to be red men, for their complexions had been darkened by the plentiful infusion of negro blood, or bleached by the admixture of blood from Caucasian veins.

==== The Committee and its formation ====
In 1852, a committee was formed to consider proposals to terminate the Narragansett's tribal status, which was suggested in 1857, 1859, and 1866. The 1880 law was a result of this process. The act called for the purchase of all remaining tribal lands and reservations, dissolved the tribe, and ended all law's conferring special legal status on Narragansetts. The opinion briefly considers the mentions of Indians in the Articles of Confederation and United States Constitution and finds no obstacle to the 1880 act in those texts of the U.S. Supreme Court's jurisprudence up to that time. Regarding Worcester v. Georgia (1832), the court remarks:

Some of the reasoning in the foregoing opinion seems to us faulty and not well grounded. ... It is a very strained interpretation to say that the power to regulate commerce with the Indian tribes, even in combination with the treaty-making power, carries with it the power to appropriate title to land belonging to the states, an ultimate title, resembling in some respects a reversionary interest; a title not even belonging to the Indians, though underlying the Indian title. Regulation is not appropriation.

Finally, the court opined that the act might even have been valid if the Narragansett's were federally recognized:

Be all that as it may, however, it seems to be recognized that a time may arrive when a tribe of Indians may become so degraded or reduced in numbers as to lose the power of self-government, and that then the local law must from necessity be extended over them. ... Even if the Narragansetts had ever been recognized by the United States as a tribe of Indians, it would seem as if the state would be authorized, by the necessities of the case, to take action.

== Litigation ==
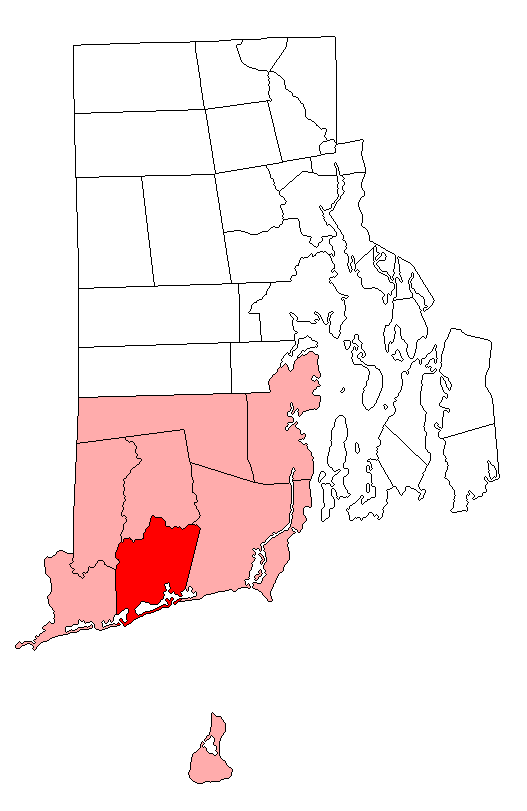
Originally claimed land in dark red, further claimed land in light red.

=== Narragansett I ===
Two lawsuits by the Narragansett against the State of Rhode Island (C.A. No. 750005) and private landowners (C.A. No. 750006) were consolidated in front of Judge Pettine. The tribe claimed aboriginal title to lands in and around Charlestown, Rhode Island, and that any title claimed by the defendants would violate the Nonintercourse Act.

==== Motion to strike ====
Citing Joint Tribal Council of the Passamaquoddy Tribe v. Morton (1st Cir. 1975) and other various Supreme Court decisions, the court held that the Nonintercourse Act applied to the lands in question. The court rejected all the defendant's affirmative defenses: laches, statute of limitations/adverse possession, estoppel by sale, operation of state law, and public policy. The court noted that: "The broad principle dictated by the Supremacy Clause ... that state statutes cannot supersede federally created rights has been applied with especial vigor to the question of Indian title as a result of the federal government's 'unique obligation toward the Indians." Thus, the court held that the state's attempt to disband the tribe in 1880 and the various state services provided to the tribe were irrelevant. The court held that the defendant's purported affirmative defenses would not defeat the tribe's claim if it proved the elements of a prima facie case; in other words, they were not affirmative defenses.

The court also rejected the defendant's attempts to rebut the elements of the tribe's prima facie case. First, the court rejected the state's argument that "aboriginal title alone does not mean a title having the protection of the Non-Intercourse Act"; the court held just the opposite. Next, the court held that it was irrelevant that the tribe was incorporated under state law and that the tribe was not federally recognized. Finally, the court held that the proviso of the Nonintercourse Acts between 1793 and 1802—relating to "Indians living on lands surrounded by settlements"—holding that the proviso was only "addressed to transactions by individual Indians living in 'white' settlements and has no application to land to which a tribal right of occupancy is claimed."

The Narragansett prevailed despite the heightened standard of review for a Rule 12(f) motion to strike, exceeding the standard the tribe would have had to carry at trial or on summary judgement.

==== Necessary party motion ====
The tribe did not move to strike the defendant's claim that the United States was a necessary party (i.e., an argument that the Narragansett could not proceed without joining the United States to the suit). However, the court rejected the defendant's necessary party motion under Rule 19(a), holding that the United States was a "necessary," but not an "indispensable" party. Thus, although the federal government could have brought the tribe's claim on its behalf, the tribe was also able to bring the claim on its own. However, the court did recognize that "all parties to this litigation to welcome the voluntary intervention of the United States, and it therefore extends a standing invitation to the United States to do so."

==== Motion to dismiss ====
The defendants also filed a motion to dismiss, claiming the suit was a nonjusticiable political question, which the court denied. Citing Baker v. Carr (1962), the court found that the action did not meet the elements of a political question.

=== Narragansett II ===
In a second opinion for the consolidated cases, Judge Pettine rejected the defendant's motion to dismiss for lack of subject-matter jurisdiction on the basis of the Eleventh Amendment to the United States Constitution. Pettine found that the tribe's claims fell with the Ex parte Young (1908) exception to state sovereign immunity, citing Supreme Court precedents involving suits over possession of land. The court distinguished "suits seeking the return of specific property ... from suits asking money damages payable out of the public treasury." Because the tribes alleged that the state's actions violated the Indian Commerce Clause and Supremacy Clause (via the Nonintercourse Act) of the Constitution, the tribe's claim was allowed under the Ex parte Young doctrine. The court did not reach the tribe's alternative argument that the state had consented to suit.

Narragansett II preceded the Supreme Court's decision in Idaho v. Coeur d'Alene Tribe of Idaho (1997) that Eleventh Amendment sovereign immunity bars any action that would have the effect of quieting title against a U.S. state.

== Rhode Island Claims Settlement Act ==
The parties reached a settlement on February 28, 1978, which—because it extinguished the tribe's aboriginal title—required Congressional legislation. Congress passed the Rhode Island Claims Settlement Act (RICSA) on September 30, 1978. In exchange for extinguishing the Narragansett's claim, the Act required the Secretary of the Interior to acquire approximately 900 acres of privately held land for the Narragansett and required the state to convey certain other publicly held lands to the Narragansett Corporation. The Act also created a $3.5 million settlement fund, funded by a federal appropriation. The Act also required the Governor to negotiate for the tribe an option to purchase additional privately held lands, exercisable by the Secretary for the tribe, with the option payment not to exceed 5% of the fair market value of the lands and the total price not to exceed the amount of the settlement fund. That Act extinguished all aboriginal title in Rhode Island, including title held by other tribes. Thus, the Act extinguished the claim of the Seaconke Wampanoag Tribe, even though they were in no way compensated by the Act. The terms of the agreement extended state civil and criminal jurisdiction to the settlement lands. No state, federal, or local property tax was to be assessed on the lands.

== Further developments ==
The Narragansett obtained federal recognition in 1983. After the passage of the Indian Gaming Regulatory Act (1988), the RICSA was amended to render the lands non-gaming eligible in 1996. As of 2005, the Narragansett have been unsuccessful in their efforts to establish a Native American gaming enterprise.

=== Carcieri v. Salazar (2009) ===
The tribe purchased 31 additional acres in Charlestown in 1991. After being denied a land use permit, the Narragansett attempted to convey the lands in trust to the Secretary of the Interior under the Indian Reorganization Act of 1934 (which would have the effect of ending state and local jurisdiction). The U.S. Supreme Court ruled in Carcieri v. Salazar (2009) that only tribes that were under federal jurisdiction as of 1934 could do so.
