= Don Gellers =

American lawyer

- Born: May 2, 1936; New York City
- Died: October 8, 2014 (aged 78); Forest Hills, Queens, New York
- Other names: Tuvia Ben-Shmuel Yosef
- Occupation(s): lawyer, rabbi
- Known for: advocacy on behalf of the Passamaquoddy people

Donald Cotesworth Gellers (2 May 1936 – 8 October 2014), also known by his Jewish name Tuvia Ben-Shmuel Yosef, was an American lawyer. In the 1960s he lived in Eastport, Maine, where he represented members of the Passamaquoddy tribe in court and advocated for their civil rights. In 1968 he filed a land claim suit on the tribe's behalf. Immediately after filing the suit he was charged with constructive possession of six marijuana cigarettes. He was convicted on a felony charge and sentenced to prison. After an unsuccessful appeal process, he moved to Israel without serving his sentence. He returned to the United States in 1980 and practiced as a rabbi until his death. In 2020 he was granted a posthumous pardon by the state of Maine.

== Early life and education ==
Gellers was born on May 2, 1936, in New York City. His father, Samuel J. Weitzen, was a doctor who had immigrated to the United States from Poland. Gellers's grandfather, great-grandfather and uncle were rabbis. His parents divorced when he was a child and his mother remarried Charles Gellers, a New York businessman.

Gellers attended Forest Hills High School and Northern Arizona University. He studied international law at Columbia University and served an internship at the United Nations before moving to Eastport, Maine in 1963 to open a law practice.

== Legal career in Maine ==
Gellers moved to Eastport in 1963 with his wife, an artist, and opened a law practice. In May 1964 he agreed to represent five Passamaquoddy women who had been arrested for protesting at a construction site on disputed land on the nearby Indian Township reservation. Subsequently, he became known for his support of the Passamaquoddy people, most of whom lived in poverty "dire even by the standards of Washington County, the poorest in New England".

As well as representing them in court, something few lawyers were willing to do, Gellers advocated for the legal and civil rights of the Passamaquoddy people. Among his accomplishments were changes that allowed the Indians to make ordinances on tribal property, to run their own housing authority, and to hunt on their own land. Gellers also helped members with custody cases and with obtaining small business loans. His efforts on behalf of the Passamaquoddy led to his receiving death threats and having signs with antisemitic slogans placed on his lawn.

In his pursuit of justice for the Passamaquoddy people, Gellers often clashed with the police and other authorities. In 1965 he alerted state and national media when the county attorney chose not to prosecute five white men who had been accused in the beating death of an Indian man, and in 1967 he represented several Indians who had been involved in a fight with a policeman and who claimed to have been victims of police brutality as a consequence.

Gellers also worked with tribal leaders on a land claim that led to the Maine Indian Claims Settlement Act of 1980. Tom Tureen, who became the tribe's lawyer in the 1970s, worked for Gellers as an intern in the summer of 1967.

In May 1968 Gellers filed a land claims suit on behalf of the Passamaquoddy tribe in Boston, claiming that the state of Maine "owed the tribe in excess of $150 million and title to tens of thousands of acres of land illegally appropriated from their treaty lands on the eastern branch of the St. Croix River". The suit was against the state of Massachusetts because Maine did not exist in 1794, when the tribe had signed its treaty with the government. Maine had been carved out of Massachusetts in 1820, and the treaty had been passed on to the newly created state, which had failed, it was alleged, to live up to its terms. Gellers hoped that Massachusetts would in turn "sue Maine as an aggrieved sovereign".

Upon his return from filing the land claims suit in Boston, Gellers was arrested and charged with "constructive possession" of six marijuana cigarettes which police claimed to have found in the pocket of a jacket hanging in Gellers's closet. Despite simple possession of marijuana having recently been downgraded to a misdemeanour, legal challenges to the new law made it technically possible to prosecute the case as a felony. At the direction of the Maine Attorney General this was done, with the prosecution being handled by the head of the Attorney General's criminal division. Gellers was found guilty in March 1969 and in May he was sentenced to two to four years in prison. As well as incarceration, the felony conviction meant "automatic disbarment".

Gellers appealed his conviction unsuccessfully over the course of two years. The judge refused to accept briefs on his behalf from the American Civil Liberties Union and the National Lawyers Guild. His request for a new trial was denied despite the testimony of Massachusetts lawyer Harvey Silverglate that the assistant Attorney General of Maine had told him that his office had set Gellers up. Having exhausted all possibilities Gellers decided to leave the country in 1971. He told the Attorney General of his intentions but the authorities made no attempt to prevent his leaving the country.

== Life in Israel ==
Gellers moved to Israel in 1971 and took the name Tuvia Ben-Shmuel Yosef. He lived on a kibbutz and was wounded fighting in the Yom Kippur War in 1973. When applying to the Israeli bar he disclosed his criminal conviction and provided the court documents for review. The reviewing body described his case as "a catalogue of horrors, including — but not limited to, multiple violations of due process, manufactured evidence, clear efforts to 'get him' because he advocated unpopular ideas and defended unpopular clients" and Gellers was admitted to the bar unreservedly.

== Later life ==
In 1980 Gellers moved back to New York City, where he became a rabbi. He was a rabbi and teacher at the Moroccan Jewish Association in Forest Hills.

In 1989 the United States Court of Appeals for the First Circuit reviewed Gellers's case and gave him a "certificate of good standing" as a lawyer despite his having left the United States before serving his prison sentence.

Gellers died in New York City on October 8, 2014. He was survived by his brother, Paul Gellers (who died on March 27, 2025), sister-in-law, Gayle Spinell-Gellers, nephews, Joshua C. Gellers and Brett Gellers, and step-daughter, Rachel Weitzen.

== Posthumous pardon ==
In 2014, shortly before his death, Gellers's story was detailed in the Portland Press Herald as part of a series of articles by Colin Woodard about the Passamaquoddy people's history since the 1960s. His family, represented pro bono by Freeport, Maine lawyer Robert Checkoway, petitioned the state of Maine for a pardon. Governor Paul LePage would not allow the pardon request to be heard. However, on October 17, 2019, the board of pardons of his successor, Governor Janet Mills, heard testimony supporting the pardon request.

On 7 January 2020 Governor Mills granted Gellers a full pardon, stating that she found "merit" in the argument that "the state had sought to thwart Gellers's 'outspoken political and legal advocacy' for the tribe". Specifically, she referred to the facts that the felony charge was disproportionate to the alleged crime; that the arrest and trial for such a minor offence were "handled by the state's top officials"; that no attempt was made to prevent Gellers from leaving the country, implying that the motive was simply to get rid of him; and that a co-defendant in the case suffered no consequences beyond forfeiting $500 bail. This was apparently the first time the state of Maine has granted a posthumous pardon.
