= Tom Tureen =

American lawyer and entrepreneur (born 1943)

- Born: Thomas Norton Tureen; 1943 (age 82–83)
- Education: Princeton University; George Washington University Law School
- Occupation: Lawyer/Investment Banker/Entrepreneur

Thomas Norton Tureen (born 1943) is an American lawyer, investment banker and entrepreneur known for his work with American Indian tribes.

While an attorney with the Native American Rights Fund he pioneered the use of the Nonintercourse Act to obtain return of tribal lands lost 180 years earlier and federal recognition for previously non-federally recognized tribes. Tureen successfully litigated Joint Tribal Council of the Passamaquoddy Tribe v. Morton (1975), which established that the federal government has a trust responsibility to protect the land of all tribes, including those not previously recognized, and that all tribes are entitled to the benefits and immunities associated with federal recognition. Between 1972 and 1983 he was lead counsel in cases that obtained federal recognition for and achieved the return of over 300,000 acres to five New England tribes. He helped the Poarch Band of Creek Indians, now one of the most successful gaming operators in the U.S., obtain federal recognition in 1984 pursuant to regulations adopted by the Department of the Interior in response to the Passamaquoddy decision. His work on behalf of the Mashantucket Pequot Tribe in Connecticut led to the creation of the Foxwoods Resort Casino, which was the largest casino in the world when opened. And he arranged the acquisition of Dragon Cement, New England's only cement producer, by the Passamaquoddy Tribe, and Phoenix Cement by the Salt River Pima Maricopa Indian Community, (now a leading supplier of cement and concrete in Arizona); originated 250 MW Moapa Solar, the first utility scale solar project in Indian Country, and originated a partnership controlled by the Morongo Band of Mission Indians that became the first tribal participating transmission owner in the U.S. and the Native American Finance Officers Association (NAFOA) 2023 Impact Deal of the Year.

== Early life and education ==
Tureen, the son of a St. Louis businessman and owner of multiple hotels, graduated from Princeton University in 1966 and George Washington University Law School in 1969. At Princeton, he majored in literature and poetry. His interest in Native American issues stems from a summer working at a Bureau of Indian Affairs-run off-reservation boarding school in Pierre, South Dakota, while an undergraduate. He considered dropping out of law school in his second semester but decided not to after hearing a speech by Edgar S. Cahn, head of the Citizens' Advocate Center, for whom he then worked full-time during the remainder of his time in law school. Tureen was responsible for the field research for Cahn's expose of the Bureau of Indian Affairs, Our Brother's Keeper: The Indian in White America.

== Career ==
=== Land Claims ===
Tureen spent the summer following his first year in law school in Maine working for the Law Students' Civil Rights Research Council under the supervision of attorney Don Gellers. He moved to Maine following graduation from law school in 1969 to run the one-person Pine Tree Legal Assistance's Indian Legal Services Unit in remote Calais, Maine. In 1971, while working on federal grants for the tribes and civil actions for individual tribal members, he co-authored with Francis J. O'Toole an article in the Maine Law Review titled "State Power and the Passamaquoddy Tribe: A Gross National Hypocrisy," which laid out the legal theories on which the Nonintercourse Act claims would be based. In 1972 he joined the Native American Rights Fund (NARF), where he was employed for the next ten years while pursuing the Nonintercourse Act land claims. Neither he nor any of his colleagues received a fee from the settlements that were ultimately awarded.

The Nonintercourse Act, which was adopted in 1790, provides that no transaction involving Indian land is valid without the consent of Congress. While widely considered prior to 1970 to protect only tribes in the western part of the United States, it applies by its terms to "any nation or tribe of Indians." Transactions that violate the statute are "void ab initio, of no validity in law or equity." Taking the literal language of the statute and the Supreme Court rule that statutes involving Indians must be liberally interpreted as the Indians would have understood them, Tureen and his colleagues identified tribes along the eastern seaboard that had lost land without federal approval subsequent to 1790 and filed claims with their consent on their behalf. Unlike claims brought under the Indian Claims Commission Act, a 1946 statute that provided monetary compensation for tribes whose lands had been lost unfairly - Tureen and his colleagues sought actual return of land plus monetary damages for trespass.

The claims in which Tureen was involved ranged in size from 2,000 acres to 12.5 million acres and in some instances were highly disruptive. For example, in 1976 following the decision in Passamaquoddy v. Morton, the Maine municipal bond market collapsed when lawyers at Ropes and Gray, a respected Boston law-firm, refused to certify that municipalities could enforce nonpayment of property taxes by foreclosing on property subject to a Nonintercourse Act claim. Titles in the Town of Mashpee were frozen during the pendency of the Mashpee claims because insurers were unwilling to guarantee good title.

All of the settlements in which Mr. Tureen was involved provided for federal recognition of the tribes involved and the appropriation of federal funds for the purchase of the land from willing sellers for return to the tribes.

=== Private Law Practice and Investment Banking ===
After leaving NARF in 1982, Tureen co-founded a law firm, Tureen and Margolin and a boutique investment bank, Tribal Assets Management. Tribal Assets helped tribes acquire existing businesses, primarily off reservation, as means of generating investment capital and developing business connections that could be used to bring new businesses and jobs to the reservations. During the 1980s Tribal Assets arranged the acquisition of Dragon Cement, New England's only cement manufacturer and Maine's largest concrete supplier by the Passamaquoddy Tribe, Carolina Mirror, the largest independent mirror manufacturer in the United States, by the Eastern Band of Cherokee Indians, Simpson Electric, a leading manufacturer of analog electronic test equipment, by the Lac du Flambeau Band of Chippewa Indians, Brunswick Technology, a manufacturer of Kevlar helmets by the Devils Lake Sioux Tribe, and Phoenix Cement, one of two cement manufacturing plants in Arizona, by the Salt River Pima Maricopa Indian Community.

=== Gaming ===
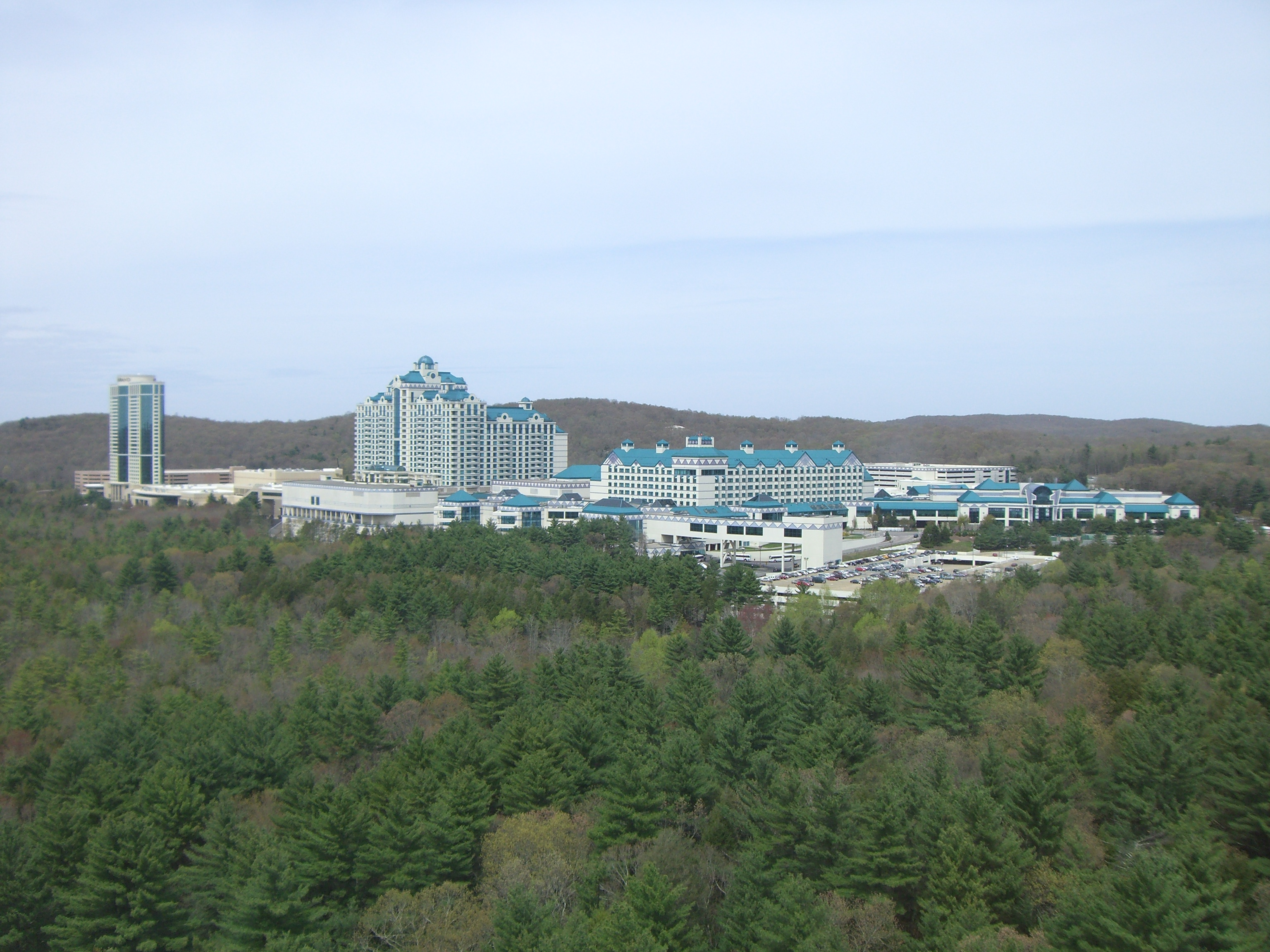
Foxwoods Resort Casino

In 1986 Tureen & Margolin won a federal court decision holding that the Mashantucket Pequot Tribe, the smallest of Tureen's land claim clients in terms of membership and size of claim, could operate a commercial bingo game without being subject to Connecticut's limits on pot size or hours of operation. With help from Tureen & Margolin, the Pequots' initial gaming facility was financed with a $5 million Bureau of Indian Affairs guaranteed loan (repaid within one year) and managed for two years by the Penobscot Nation. In 1990, Tureen and Margolin won a court decision holding that the Pequots could operate table and other games of chance that Connecticut authorized under its "Casino Night" statute but without being subject to state limits. In 1992 the Pequots opened Foxwoods Resort Casino, which soon became Connecticut's largest tax-payer and fourth largest employer. Tureen's role in creating Foxwoods is featured in Without Reservation: How a Controversial Indian Tribe Rose to Power and Built the World's Largest Casino by Jeff Benedict. Benedict is critical of both Tureen and the Pequots, whose Indian ancestry the author doubts.

In 2003 Tureen led an unsuccessful statewide referendum effort in Maine aimed at obtaining gaming rights for the Passamaquoddy Tribe and the Penobscot Nation. In 2004 he moved to San Francisco.

=== Energy ===
In 2009 Tureen and William Kriegel, founder and former CEO of Sithe Energy, a large independent power producer, formed K Road Desert Power, LLC with the objective of developing renewable energy projects on Indian reservations. Tureen originated a 2,000-acre solar project on the Moapa River Indian Reservation in Nevada, the first utility scale solar project in Indian Country. K Road obtained a 250 MW, 25-year power purchase agreement from the Los Angeles Department of Water and Power for the project, permitted the project, and ultimately sold it to First Solar, Inc.

Tureen originated and was Vice-Chairman of Morongo Transmission, LLC, an investment partnership led by the Morongo Band of Mission Indians, that financed a $400 million transmission upgrade through the Morongo reservation and made it possible for California to meet its 2020 goal of obtaining a third of its electricity from renewable sources without increased cost to the ratepayers. In 2023 Morongo Transmission was selected Impact Deal of the Year by the Native American Finance Officers Association.

Tureen is currently the managing member of Coachella Energy, LLC, which advises tribes on behind-the-meter power for data centers on Indian reservations.
