= Mashpee Tribe v. New Seabury Corp. =

- Court: United States Court of Appeals for the First Circuit
- Full case name: Mashpee Tribe v. New Seabury Corp.
- Decided: Feb. 13, 1979
- Citation: 592 F.2d 575 (1st Cir. 1979)

Case history
- Prior actions: 427 F. Supp. 899 (D. Mass. 1977) (denying motion to dismiss); 447 F. Supp. 940 (D. Mass. 1978) (entering judgment for the defendant)

Court membership
- Judges sitting: Frank M. Coffin, Levin H. Campbell, Hugh H. Bownes

Case opinions
- Coffin, joined by Campbell and Bownes; Bownes (concurring)

Mashpee Tribe v. New Seabury Corp., 592 F.2d 575 (1st Cir. 1979), was the first litigation of the Nonintercourse Act to go to a jury. After a 40-day trial, the jury decided that the Mashpee Tribe was not a "tribe" at several of the relevant dates for the litigation, and the United States Court of Appeals for the First Circuit upheld that determination (the panel included two judges from the landmark Joint Tribal Council of the Passamaquoddy Tribe v. Morton (1975) panel).

The Mashpee, as a tribe and individually, attempted to re-litigate the issue several times without success. In 2007, the Department of the Interior granted federal recognition to the Mashpee, and the tribe and the town of Mashpee, Massachusetts entered into a settlement agreement.

== Background ==
The Mashpee lands were sold in 1834 and 1870 without federal consent. The Mashpee claim implicated 11,000 acres, worth approximately $30,000,000 at the time of trial. The Mashpee's attempts to settle the claim were rebuffed.

== Trial ==
The Mashpee filed suit on August 16, 1976 against a defendant class of land owners in the town of Mashpee. The United States District Court for the District of Massachusetts opted to hold separate trials, beginning with the issue of tribal status at the time of the suit and the time of the transactions. The Mashpee attempted to obtain a continuance so that the Department of the Interior could determine their tribal status instead, but the court denied their motion.

The trial began on October 17, 1977. After forty days of trial, special interrogatories were submitted to the jury on January 4, 1978. The verdict was returned on January 6, finding that the Mashpee were a tribe on March 3, 1834 (when the District of Mashpee was established) and on March 3, 1843 (when the District of Mashpee was partitioned) but were not a tribe on July 22, 1790 (the day the first Nonintercourse Act was passed), June 22, 1869 (the date on which the state law restraints on alienation were removed by the legislature), May 28, 1870 (the date on which the town of Mashpee was incorporated), or when the suit was filed.

The plaintiffs moved for a new trial on the basis that the special verdict was inconsistent. This motion was denied. All-in-all, the defendants paid $350,000 in legal bills.

== Opinion ==
Before the First Circuit, the Mashpee argued: (1) that the district court should have granted their motion for a continuance; (2) that the district court erred in instructing the jury on the definition of a "tribe"; (3) that the district court erred in allocating the burden of proof to the Mashpee; (4) that the district court erred in not granting a new trial on the basis of the special verdict; and (5) that the district court erred in its handing of ex parte communication with a juror.

The First Circuit rejected all these arguments and affirmed.

=== Continuance ===
The First Circuit rejected the idea that the district court should have waited for an agency determination, holding: "[T]his is not the kind of case in which the Supreme Court has required courts to defer to administrative process." Much of the holding focuses on the historical inaction of the Department in developing a procedure for contested determinations:'

The Department of the Interior has not historically spent much effort deciding whether particular groups of people are Indian tribes. By and large no one has disputed the tribal status of Indians with whom the Department has dealt. The Department has never formally passed on the tribal status of the Mashpees or, so far as the record shows, any other group whose status was disputed. Therefore, the Department does not yet have prescribed procedures and has not been called on to develop special expertise in distinguishing tribes from other groups of Indians.

To that end, the court added the qualification that "once the Department has finally approved its regulations and developed special expertise through applying them, we might arrive at a different answer." Additionally, the First Circuit found that the issues were suitable for in-court determination:

[T]he facts in this case, though developed and interpreted in part with the expert help of historians and anthropologists, are not so technical as to be beyond the understanding of judges or juries. As the court said in its charge, 'We are dealing with the human condition here as well.'"

=== Definition of "tribe" ===
The First Circuit noted that tribal status often goes unlitigated because federally recognized tribes are presumed to be tribes in the legal sense. Instead, the district court had relied upon the definition from Montoya v. United States (1901): "By a ‘tribe’ we understand a body of Indians of the same or similar race, united in a community under one leadership or government, and inhabiting a particular though sometimes ill-defined territory . . . ." The court reviewed at length the supplemental instructions the trial court had given to clarify that definition. The First Circuit approved those instructions, with a rather substantial caveat:

We conclude that though a few isolated sentences of the charge may have been unclear or overstated, the instructions taken as a whole were largely consistent with the position plaintiff argued before us. Therefore, we will not reverse on the basis of the court's instructions. This holding is a narrow one, and it may be useful to point out what we do not hold. We have no occasion to pass on portions of the court's instruction other than those discussed above. Even as to those portions we have considered, the issue we have decided, technically, is not whether those portions are correct as a matter of law, but whether they conform to the objecting party's view of the law. Finding they do, we see no remaining controversy. Because there are no sure yardsticks against which to measure the court's instructions, we cannot say that even those we considered are correct or the best possible, but we have not found any law conflicting with the portions of the charge we have reviewed.

Judge Bownes, concurring, would have held the instruction correct as a matter of law, rather than merely consistent enough with the objecting party's view of the law.

=== Burden of proof ===
The district court had allocated the burden of proof to the plaintiff on all issues. The plaintiff's argued first that the district court should have at least shifted the burden to the defendants to prove that they had ceased to be a tribe for the periods after which the jury determined the tribe had carried its burden.

Second, the Mashpee argued that 25 U.S.C. § 194 shifted the burden. That section provides: "In all trials about the right of property in which an Indian may be a party on one side, and a white person on the other, the burden of proof shall rest upon the white person, whenever the Indian shall make out a presumption of title in himself from the fact of previous possession or ownership." The First Circuit held the statute had no application to the initial question of whether the plaintiff was a tribe.

=== Special verdict consistency ===
The Mashpee argued that the verdict was inconsistent because there was no way a tribe in existence in 1842 could have voluntarily ceased being a tribe by 1869. The First Circuit agreed that it was unlikely, but, drawing all inferences in favor of the verdict, not impossible.

=== Juror communication ===
After the trial, a bus commuter notified the court that one juror had talked about his involvement in the case on the bus and mentioned a threatening phone call he had received. The district court, with counsel for both sides present, questioned the former jury about the incident and concluded that it had not affected the verdict enough to merit a new trial. The First Circuit held that the trial judge did not abuse his discretion by doing so.
