= Indispensable party =

An indispensable party (also called a required party, necessary party, or necessary and indispensable party) is a party in a lawsuit whose participation is required for jurisdiction or the purpose of rendering a judgment. In reality, a party may be "necessary" but not indispensable. For example, if they claim an interest in the litigation, that interest may be impeded if they are not joined. That does not transform them into an indispensable party unless their absence threatens some other party's interest. Often, an indispensable party is any party whose rights are directly affected by disposition of the case. Many jurisdictions have rules that provide for an indispensable party to be joined (brought into the case as a party) at the discretion of the judge, which is referred to as a nonjoinder of party. In some cases, the inability to join such a party means that the case must be dismissed. In the United States, this is outlined in the Federal Rules of Civil Procedure, Rule 19.

== Identifying an indispensable party ==
The indispensable party is often a prudential standing requirement. That is, while the parties currently involved in litigation have an actual case or controversy, judges will not proceed without the indispensable party. This avoids potential double litigation and possibly inequitable outcomes. In determining whether a party is indispensable, courts generally look to three factors:

1. Will the missing party's interests be harmed in some direct way by the outcome of the case?
2. Does the missing party have an interest which would cause another party to the case to be subjected to multiple obligations?
3. Can the court provide complete relief to the plaintiff without the presence of the missing party?

In patent law, for example, a patent owner is an indispensable party to a patent infringement suit brought by an exclusive licensee against an alleged infringer. The patent owner's rights would be directly affected by a finding of invalidity or unenforceability of the patent claims. At the same time, if the patent owner is not a party to the case, the alleged infringer could be sued separately by the patent owner, and could end up having to pay two judgments for the same act of infringement.

== Determining feasibility of joining indispensable party ==
Once it has been determined that a missing party is indispensable, the court must determine whether it is feasible to join that party to the case. In making this determination, the court will use the same analysis that it uses to determine whether it has jurisdiction over any party. Firstly, it must determine whether it can exercise personal jurisdiction over the party. Secondly, it must determine whether the exercise of personal jurisdiction will affect its subject matter jurisdiction. In diversity cases, which brought in federal court on the basis of all plaintiffs coming from different states as all defendants, joinder will not be deemed feasible if it destroys diversity.

Where the missing party can not be brought into the case, the court must determine whether it is possible to proceed without joining that party. If it is not possible to proceed, the case will be dismissed.

In some jurisdictions, the failure to join an indispensable party does not hinder the case. For example, the Commonwealth of Virginia does not recognize the doctrine of indispensable parties. Although a defendant may argue that the plaintiff has improperly failed to join a party that would conventionally be deemed indispensable and may seek to have the court attempt to join the missing party, if it is not feasible to join the missing party, the case will simply go on without it.
