= Pine Tree Legal Assistance =

Pine Tree Legal Assistance (PTLA) is a nonprofit agency that specializes in providing free civil legal services for the poor in Maine, United States. Based in Portland but operating statewide, PTLA opened in 1967. It was led by Nan Heald from 1990 to 2022. In 2022, it received a $2 million federal grant which allowed it to double the size of its anti-eviction program.
