= Maine Law Review =

- Discipline: Law
- Language: English

Publication details
- History: 1962-present
- Publisher: University of Maine School of Law (United States)
- Frequency: Biannually

Standard abbreviations
- Bluebook: Me. L. Rev.
- ISO 4: Maine Law Rev.

Indexing
- ISSN: 0025-0651
- OCLC no.: 50481077

Links
- Journal homepage; Online archive

The Maine Law Review is a law review published by students at the University of Maine School of Law.

== Overview ==
The Maine Law Review is one of the two student-run legal journals at the University of Maine School of Law. It is published twice annually, and contains scholarly articles as well as notes and comments.

== History ==
From 1898 to 1920, the University of Maine published volumes 1 to 13 of the Maine Law Review. The journal was discontinued when the school closed, but when the University of Maine School of Law reopened in 1962, publication resumed beginning with volume 14.

== Membership ==
Members are chosen by class rank and an annual writing contest. Only second and third year full-time law students are eligible for membership. Second year (or third year students who did not join their second year) are members of the staff and third year students (with one year of experience) are members of the Board of Editors.

== Notable editors ==
- Heather Sanborn, attorney, businesswoman, Maine Public Advocate, and Maine State Senator
