= Houlton Band of Maliseet Indians =

Federally recognized Indian tribe in Maine

Houlton Band of Maliseet Indians Metaksonekiyak Wolastoqewiyik
- Indian reservation
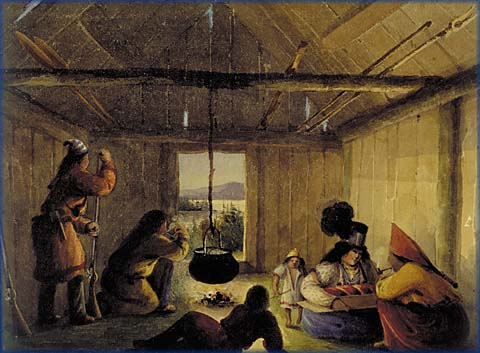
- Maliseet Indian Wooden Hut Interior watercolor by Robert Petley, c. 1850

- Flag
- Etymology: Houlton/Maliseet; Joseph Houlton/He speaks slowly
- The Houlton Maliseet Reservation in the U.S. State of Maine
- Country: United States
- State: Maine

Government
  - Type: Tribe
  - Body: Tribal Council
  - Tribal Chief: Clarissa Sabattis

Population (2013)
  - Total: 869
- Demonym(s): Malecite; Wəlastəkwiyik
- Time zone: UTC-5 (Eastern Time Zone)
- Website: maliseets.net

The Houlton Band of Maliseet Indians of Maine (HBMI) (Malecite-Passamaquoddy: Metaksonekiyak Wolastoqewiyik (MW)) is a federally recognized tribe of Wolastoqiyik (Maliseet), whose land is along the Meduxnekeag River in Maine, United States. They are headquartered in Littleton, Maine, located in Aroostook County.

This Houlton Band is related to the larger Wolastoqey First Nations of New Brunswick, Canada. The Wolastoqiyik have traditionally occupied areas of the Saint John River valley, including its tributary, the Meduxnekeag River. When Great Britain and the United States established a boundary through this area under the Jay Treaty of 1794, the Wolastoqiyik were given the right to freely cross the border with Canada, as it was within their ancestral territory. The Houlton Band was invited to take a nonvoting seat in the Maine Legislature, starting with the 126th Legislature in 2013.

== Government ==
The Houlton Band is governed by a tribal chief and a six-member council. The tribal chief is democratically elected and serves a four-year term, as are the tribal councilors, whose elections are staggered. As of July 1, 2023, the Tribal government consisted of:

- Tribal Chief: Clarissa Sabattis
- Councilor: Joshua Toner
- Councilor: Crystal Tucker
- Councilor: Beth Aucoin
- Councilor: Cathy St. John
- Councilor: Suzanne Desiderio
- Councilor: John Flewelling

Each American Indian nation in Maine is allotted a non-voting seat in the Maine Legislature, a tradition started in 1823 and formalized in 2013. The Houlton Band have refused to send a delegate since 2018, due to their strained relationship with Democratic governor, Janet Mills, due to the latter's refusal to allot more federal funds for Indian reservations. However, in summer of 2023, Maine's legislature passed a law that would allow tribes in Maine access to federal laws and a degree of self-determination independent from the state of Maine. In March 2023, a Houlton Maliseet representative returned to the legislature, along ones from three other tribes: the Passamaquoddy Tribe, Penobscot Nation, and the Mi'kmaq Nation. In 2022, the Houlton Band of Maliseets appointed its first ever Tribal Ambassador, Osihkiyol Crofton-Macdonald.

Starting in November 2023, the Houlton Band began the process of creating a Healing to Wellness Court, a restorative justice effort to reduce a repeat of criminal behavior and to engage the local community. The court is largely modeled after the one created by the Penobscot Indian Island Reservation.

== Economic development ==
The Houlton Band of Maliseet Indians farms potatoes, barley, and clover on tribal lands. They also own a roller skating rink (Rollerama).

In conjunction with the municipal government of Houlton, the HBMI were awarded $15,000,000 as part of the Foxcroft Road improvements to repair and widen the tribe's main arterial road into the city, which also acts as a border crossing with Canada. Houlton Band In 2023 the HBMI entered a partnership with Caesars Sportsbook and where given exclusive rights to operate mobile sports wagering in the state.

== Watershed restoration ==
The Houlton Band is working to restore the watershed of the Meduxnekeag River, which was damaged by logging drives, and bring back the native Atlantic salmon. The restoration aims to slow the flow of the river and cool its overheated waters, which a planner with the HBMI said are both increasing with climate change in Maine. The river lacks the structure and complexity that it used to have that allowed salmon and other fish to live in the river. In 2023, the Houlton Band of Maliseet Indians received $1.6 million in federal funds for river restoration within the Saint John River watershed. Projects will address habitat needs, infrastructure, biodiversity, and "high climate risk".

== Culture ==
The Wolastoqiyik traditionally spoke Wolastoqey, a branch of the Algonquian language family. The people now use English as their first language. They constitute nearly six percent of the population of Houlton.

Every year the HBMI hold a "Recognition Day" celebration, commemorating the anniversary of when the tribe received federal recognition. The tribe was recognized on September 9, 1980, by an act of Congress, the Maine Indian Claims Settlement Act of 1980.

== Sources ==
- Abler, Thomas S. (November 1, 1990). "Micmacs and Gypsies: Occupation of the Peripatetic Niche" (PDF). In Cowan, William (ed.). Papers of the Twenty-First Algonquian Conference. Algonquian Conference. Vol. 21. Ottawa, Ontario, Canada: Carleton University. pp. 1–11. S2CID 55920701.

== See also ==
- Mi'kmaq Nation
