= Miꞌkmaq Nation =

Native American tribe in Maine, United States

- Location of the Miꞌkmaq Nation Trust Land

Total population
- 1,110+

Regions with significant populations
- United States (Maine)

Languages
- English, Miꞌkmaq

Religion
- Roman Catholicism, traditional tribal religion

Related ethnic groups
- Other Miꞌkmaq people

The Miꞌkmaq Nation (formerly the Aroostook Band of Micmacs) is a US federally recognized tribe of Miꞌkmaq people, based in Aroostook County, Maine. Their autonym is Ulustuk. Of the 28 bands of Miꞌkmaq people, the Miꞌkmaq Nation is the only one in the United States. The Miꞌkmaq Nation were the first non-US power to sign a treaty with the United States, the Treaty of Watertown, on 6 July 1776.

The tribe has no reservation but owns 1,350 acres (5.5 km^{2}) of land. The United States Census Bureau listed 1,047 acres (4.236 km^{2}) of trust land in the 2010 United States census, located at in the Town of Limestone. An official population of 197 inhabitants was counted on the trust lands. The band is headquartered in Presque Isle. The governing council consists of nine members that serve four-year terms with the tribal chief and vice chief, along with three tribal council seats elected together and four other tribal council seats elected two years later.

They form part of a large Algonquian-speaking nation known as the Miꞌkmaq. Their ancestral homeland reaches as far northeast as Newfoundland and historically includes Cape Breton Island, Nova Scotia, Prince Edward Island, a large part of New Brunswick, and a small part of Quebec in the Chaleurs Bay area.

The band was federally recognized through congressional legislation on November 26, 1991, after a long campaign. At the time of federal recognition, the tribe was known as the Aroostook Band of Micmacs. In January 2022, the tribe officially adopted the name Miꞌkmaq Nation.

== See also ==
- Wolastoqiyik
