= County of Oneida v. Oneida Indian Nation of New York State =

- Supreme Court of the United States

Argued October 1, 1984 Decided March 4, 1985
- Full case name: County of Oneida, New York, et al. v. Oneida Indian Nation of New York State, et al.
- Citations: 470 U.S. 226 (more) 105 S. Ct. 1245, 84 L. Ed. 2d 169, 53 U.S.L.W. 4225

Case history
- Prior: 464 F.2d 916 (2d Cir. 1972), cert. granted, 412 U.S. 927 (1973), rev'd, Oneida Indian Nation of New York v. County of Oneida, 414 U.S. 661 (1974), on remand, 434 F. Supp. 527 (N.D.N.Y. 1977), aff'd, 719 F.2d 525 (2d Cir. 1983), cert. granted, 465 U.S. 1099 (1984).
- Subsequent: Rehearing denied, 471 U.S. 1062 (1985), on remand, 217 F. Supp. 2d 292 (N.D.N.Y. 2002), motion for relief denied, 214 F.R.D. 83 (N.D.N.Y. 2003), motion for relief granted after remand, 2003 WL 21026573 (N.D.N.Y. 2003).

Holding
- Indian tribes have a federal common law cause of action, not preempted by the Nonintercourse Act, for possessory claims based upon aboriginal title; such action is not barred by limitations, abatement, ratification or nonjusticiability, and due to the Eleventh Amendment, there is no ancillary jurisdiction for counties' cross-claims against a state.

Court membership
- Chief Justice Warren E. Burger Associate Justices William J. Brennan Jr. · Byron White; Thurgood Marshall · Harry Blackmun; Lewis F. Powell Jr. · William Rehnquist; John P. Stevens · Sandra Day O'Connor

Case opinions
- Majority: Powell, joined by Blackmun, O'Connor (Parts I, II, III, IV, VI joined by Brennan, Marshall; Part V joined by Burger, White, Rehnquist)
- Concur/dissent: Brennan, joined by Marshall
- Concur/dissent: Stevens, joined by Burger, White, Rehnquist

Laws applied
- U.S. Const. amend. XI; Federal common law; Nonintercourse Act

County of Oneida v. Oneida Indian Nation of New York State, 470 U.S. 226 (1985), is a landmark United States Supreme Court case concerning aboriginal title in the United States. The case, sometimes referred to as Oneida II, was "the first Indian land claim case won on the basis of the Nonintercourse Act".

The Supreme Court held that Indian tribes have a common law cause of action for possessory land claims based upon aboriginal title, that the Nonintercourse Act did not preempt that cause of action, and that the cause of action was not barred by a statute of limitations, abatement, implicit federal ratification, or nonjusticiability. Four dissenting justices would have held for the counties on the defense of laches, a question which the majority did not reach, but expressed doubts about.

Furthermore, the Court held that, due to the Eleventh Amendment, federal courts could not exercise ancillary jurisdiction over cross-claims by counties against states. Although only two other justices agreed with the entirety of Justice Powell's majority opinion, Brennan and Marshall agreed with Parts I-IV and VI (the Oneida's claims against the counties) and Burger, White, and Rehnquist agreed with Part V (the counties claims against the state), thus forging separate majorities.

The case is often referred to as Oneida II because it is the second of three times the Oneida Indian Nation reached the Supreme Court in litigating its land rights claims. It followed Oneida Indian Nation of New York v. County of Oneida (Oneida I) (1974), holding that there was federal subject-matter jurisdiction, and was followed by City of Sherrill v. Oneida Indian Nation of New York (2005), rejecting the tribe's attempt in a later lawsuit to re-assert tribal sovereignty over parcels of land re-acquired by the tribe in fee simple.

== Background ==
This was the second time the Supreme Court had granted certiorari to the Oneida's land claim. Over a decade earlier, in Oneida Indian Nation of New York v. County of Oneida (1974), the Supreme Court had allowed the same suit to proceed by unanimously holding that there was federal subject-matter jurisdiction to hear the claim. Since then, Justices William O. Douglas and Potter Stewart had departed, replaced by John Paul Stevens and Sandra Day O'Connor.

On remand, the United States District Court for the Northern District of New York had found the counties liable to the Oneida for wrongful possession of their lands, awarded damages of $16,694, plus interest, representing the fair rental value of the land in question for the 2-year period specified in the complaint. Finally, the District Court required New York state to indemnify the counties. The United States Court of Appeals for the Second Circuit affirmed.

The Supreme Court granted certiorari "to determine whether an Indian tribe may have a live cause of action for a violation of its possessory rights that occurred 175 years ago," ultimately agreeing with the District Court and Second Circuit that the tribe may. On appeal, the counties did not dispute the District Court's findings that the Oneida held aboriginal title to the lands in question, and that the 1795 conveyances of the lands to the state violated the Nonintercourse Act. The counties instead argued that the Nonintercourse Act preempted the Oneida's cause of action, that any cause of action was time barred, non-justifiable, and abated, and that any conveyance was ratified by the federal government.

== Change of counsel ==
The case was initiated by George Shattuck of Bond, Schoeneck & King(BS&K), on a contingency fee basis rather than as a pro bono matter. The retainer agreement between the firm and the tribe, approved (as required) by the Department of the Interior, provided that the firm would litigate the tribe's Nonintercourse Act claim only against the government and would not sue private land owners; another firm was handling the tribe's claim before the Indian Claims Commission.

Shattuck argued Oneida I alone before the Supreme Court. The Native American Rights Fund (NARF), which had assisted initially assisted the firm, served as co-counsel in the trial after the Oneida I decision and took over completely on the second appeal. The NARF also filed another suit behalf of the Oneidas, pressing the Oneida's possessory claims against landowners over additional lands.

As of March 2011, BS&K had yet to receive any attorney's fees from the tribe. On July 11, 2011, the United States District Court for the Northern District of New York ruled that BS&K was entitled to $5,174.54 in fees; the district court reduced the fees to that number after finding that BS&K had breached its duty of loyalty to the Oneida's by also representing the Canadian claimants.

== Opinion of the Court ==
The majority opinion by Justice Lewis F. Powell, Jr. recognized the Oneida's federal common law cause of action, and rejected all the counties' affirmative defenses.

Cause of action

The Second Circuit held that the Oneida had both a federal common law cause of action and an implied cause of action under the Nonintercourse Act of 1793 (the version that governed the 1795 transaction). The Supreme Court did not reach the statutory question because it held that "the Indians' common-law right to sue is firmly established." The court recognized that "[n]umerous decisions of this Court prior to Oneida I recognized at least implicitly that Indians have a federal common-law right to sue to enforce their aboriginal land rights," citing a string of examples back to Johnson v. McIntosh (1823). The court concluded:

[W]e hold that the Oneidas can maintain this action for violation of their possessory rights based on federal common law.

As to the Nonintercourse Act, the Court held that it did not preempt the cause of action because "[t]he Nonintercourse Act of 1793 does not speak directly to the question of remedies for unlawful conveyances of Indian land." The court noted that the Act "did not establish a comprehensive remedial plan for dealing with violations of Indian property rights" and that there was "no indication in the legislative history that Congress intended to pre-empt common-law remedies." Because the Act contained no remedial provisions, and because subsequent Congressional enactments contemplated possessory land suits by Indians, the Court found that preemption was not indicated. The court reviewed its recent aboriginal title decisions, and reiterated its statement in Oneida I that the Act merely "put in statutory form what was or came to be the accepted rule."

Statute of limitations

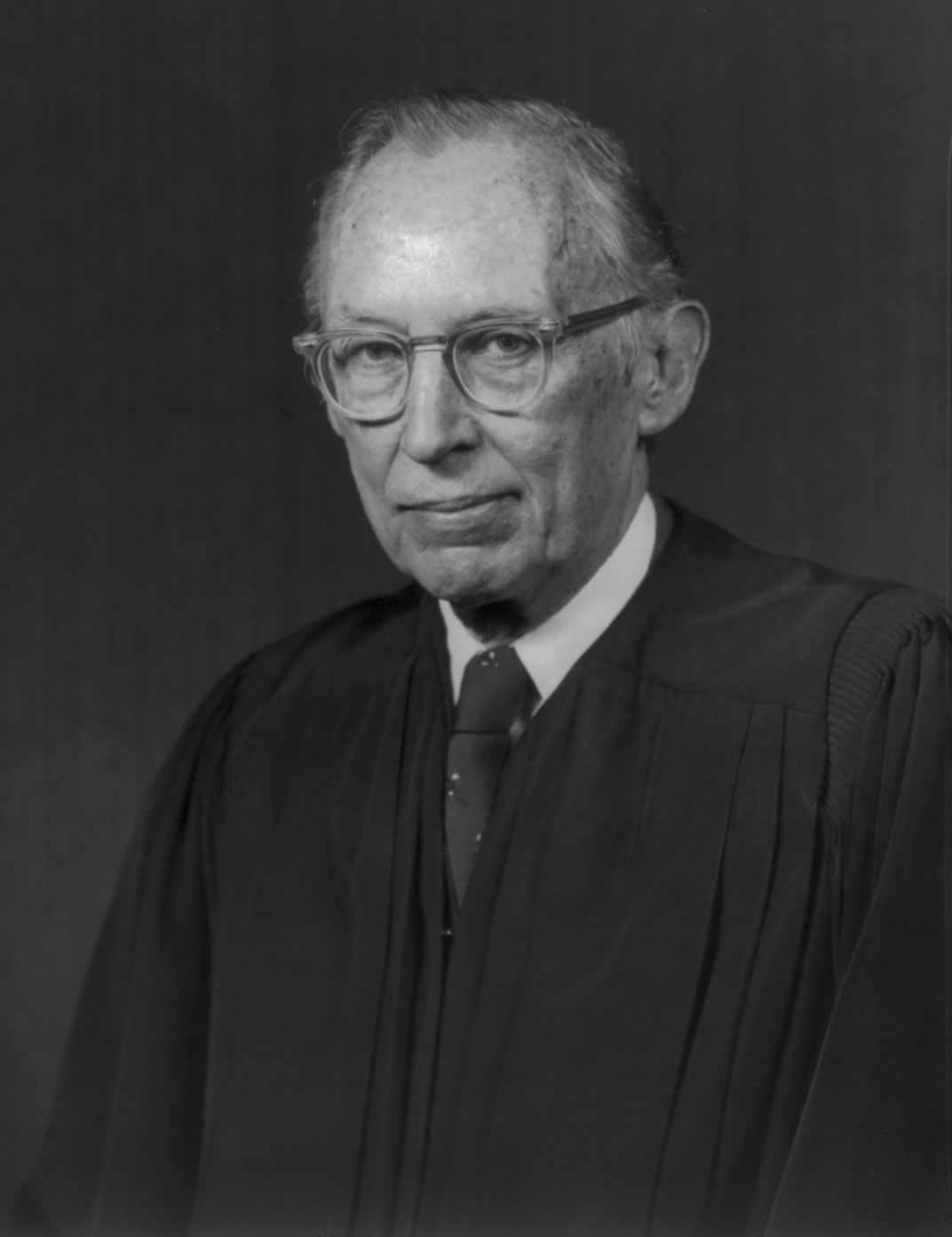
Justice Lewis F. Powell, Jr. sustained the Oneida's federal common law cause of action and rejected all of the counties' affirmative defenses.

Where there is no statute of limitations for a federal cause of action, the general rule is to borrow the analogous state statute of limitations unless such would be inconsistent with the underlying federal policies. However, here, the Court held that "borrowing of a state limitations period in these cases would be inconsistent with federal policy." Reviewing Congressional actions in the context of the Indian Claims Commission, the Court concluded that "It would be a violation of Congress' will were we to hold that a state statute of limitations period should be borrowed in these circumstances."

Laches

The majority noted that the four dissenting justices would have barred the Oneida's claim under laches. However, the majority noted that "we do not reach this issue today" because the District Court had ruled against the counties laches defense, and the counties had not raised the issue in the Second Circuit. In a footnote, the majority opined that "application of the equitable defense of laches in an action at law would be novel indeed." The same footnote cited Ewert v. Bluejacket, 259 U.S. 129 (1922) for the proposition that laches "cannot properly have application to give vitality to a void deed and to bar the rights of Indian wards in lands subject to statutory restrictions." The majority called the application of laches "questionable" and noted that such "would appear to be inconsistent with established federal policy."

In its final footnote, the majority noted that, on "[t]he question whether equitable considerations should limit the relief available to the present day Oneida Indians . . ., we express no opinion as to . . . the final disposition of this case should Congress not exercise its authority to resolve these far-reaching Indian claims."

Abatement

The counties advanced the theory that the causes of action under Nonintercourse Acts of 1790, 1793, 1796, 1799, and 1802 (unlike the final 1833 version) abated upon the expiration of the statutes. However, the Court held that because the different versions of the Act contained "substantially the same restraint on the alienation of Indian lands . . . , the precedents of this Court compel the conclusion that the Oneidas' cause of action has not abated."

Ratification

The counties advanced the theory that later treaties between the Oneidas and the United States, which ceded different lands to New York, constituted a ratification of the earlier conveyances (and thus those conveyances were in compliance with the Nonintercourse Act). The Court found this interpretation untenable under the canons of construction of federal Indian law, which provide that, inter alia, "treaties should be construed liberally in favor of the Indians."

Nonjusticiability

The counties final argument was that the Oneida's land claim was a nonjusticiable political question. The Court found this argument to be non-meritorious in light of similar Indian law precedents.

Ancillary jurisdiction

The final question before the Court was whether the District Court rightly exercised ancillary jurisdiction over the counties' cross-claim against the state for indemnification. The Court rejected, as having "no basis in law," the Second Circuit's theory that "by violating a federal statute, the State consented to suit in federal court by any party on any claim, state or federal, growing out of the same nucleus of operative facts as the statutory violation." Although the counties' cross-claim would meet the traditional criteria for ancillary jurisdiction, the Court found those criteria foreclosed by the Eleventh Amendment.

Conclusion

The Court concluded by remarking upon the "potential consequences of affirmance," arguing that "this litigation makes abundantly clear the necessity for congressional action" to extinguish Indian title by statute. In the words of the Court:

One would have thought that claims dating back for more than a century and a half would have been barred long ago. As our opinion indicates, however, neither petitioners nor we have found any applicable statute of limitations or other relevant legal basis for holding that the Oneidas' claims are barred or otherwise have been satisfied.

=== Brennan and Marshall ===
Justices William J. Brennan, Jr. and Thurgood Marshall joined the entirety of the majority's opinion, except the ancillary jurisdiction portion. In a brief opinion, Brennan reiterated his view from Yeomans v. Kentucky (1975) that the Eleventh Amendment "bars federal court suits against States only by citizens of other States."

=== Stevens, Burger, White, and Rehnquist ===
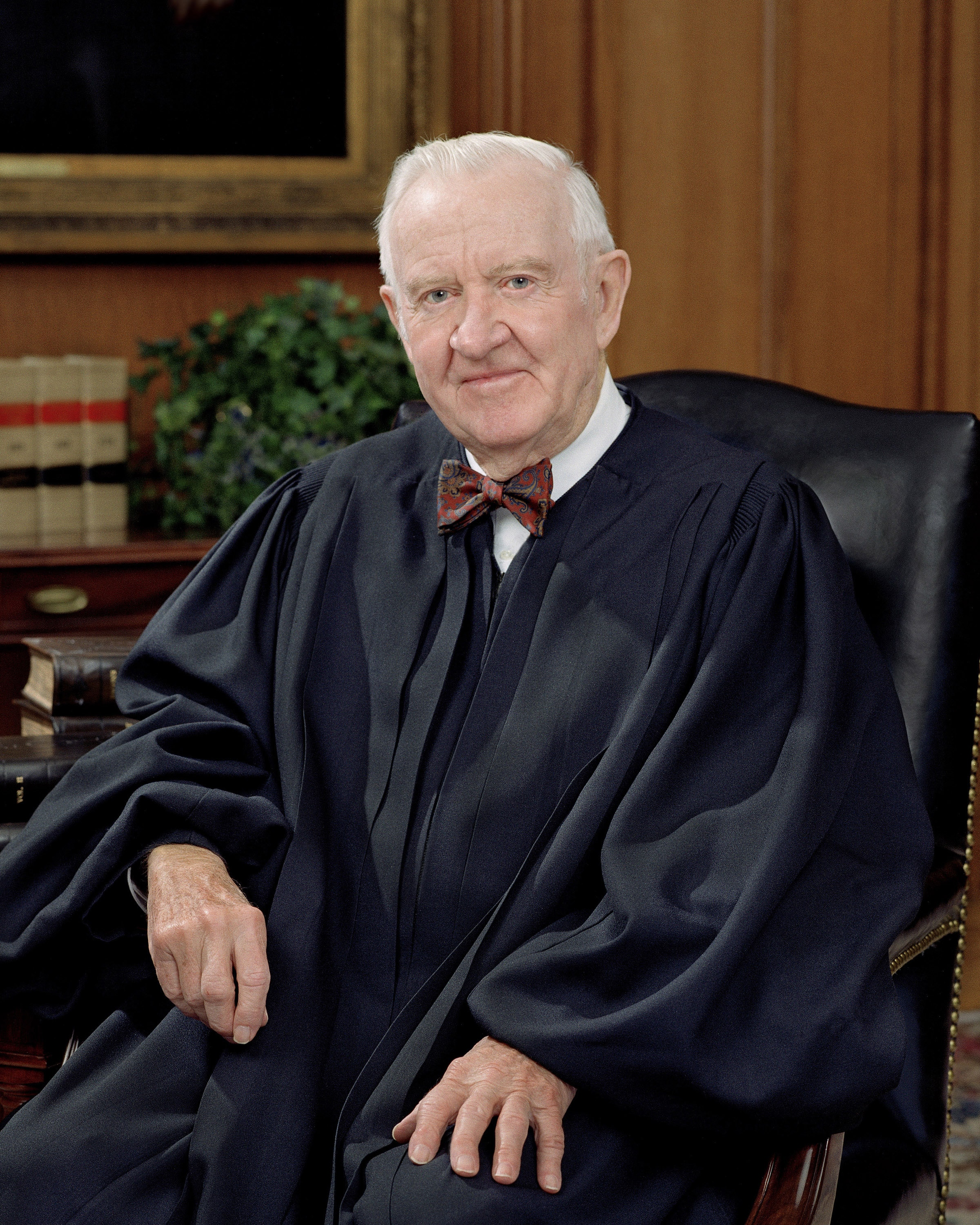
Justice John Paul Stevens would have barred the Oneida's claim under the equitable doctrine of laches.

Justice John Paul Stevens, joined by Chief Justice Warren E. Burger and Justices Byron White and William Rehnquist joined the majority's opinion as to No. 83-1240 (the cross-claims against the state) but dissented as to No. 83-1065 (the Oneida's claims against the counties). The dissenters would have barred the Oneida's claim under the equitable doctrine of laches, noting:

[In 1795, the Oneidas] made no attempt to assert the claim, and their successors in interest waited 175 years before bringing suit to avoid a 1795 conveyance that the Tribe freely made, for a valuable consideration. The absence of any evidence of deception, concealment, or interference with the Tribe's right to assert a claim, together with the societal interests that always underlie statutes of repose-particularly when title to real property is at stake-convince me that this claim is barred by the extraordinary passage of time. It is worthy of emphasis that this claim arose when George Washington was the President of the United States.

The dissenters noted various historical examples of the Court applying laches to Indian equitable claims, and argued that the doctrine should also be applied to the action of ejectment (which they admitted was an action at law, not equity). Specifically, they cited "[t]hree decisions of this Court illustrate the application of the doctrine of laches to actions seeking to set aside conveyances made in violation of federal law." Moreover, the dissenters quoted Lewis v. Marshall, 30 U.S. 470 (1831), for the proposition that:

The best interests of society require that causes of action should not be deferred an unreasonable time. This remark is peculiarly applicable to land titles. Nothing so much retards the growth and prosperity of a country as insecurity of titles to real estate. Labor is paralysed where the enjoyment of its fruits is uncertain; and litigation without limit produces ruinous consequences to individuals.

The dissent concluded:

The Court, no doubt, believes that it is undoing a grave historical injustice, but in doing so it has caused another, which only Congress may now rectify.

The dissent did not address the other defenses raised by the counties.

== Subsequent developments ==
=== Remand ===
On remand, after decades of settlement efforts, Judge McCurn entered judgments of $15,994 against Oneida County and $18,970 against Madison County, representing the full fair market rental value, minus set-offs for improvements, plus pre-judgment interest. The following year, McCurn denied cross-motions for relief from the judgment–seeking to correct various mathematical errors previously made by Judge Port—due to a pending appeal before the Second Circuit. After a stipulated remand, McCurn granted both motions.

=== Companion cases ===
Oneida Indian Nation of New York v. New York (2d Cir. 1988)

Another Oneida claim, challenging the pre-constitutional conveyance of another 6-million-acre (24,000 km^{2}) tract, was rejected by the Second Circuit in 1988, on the grounds that the Confederation Congress Proclamation of 1783 had neither the authority nor the intent to limit the acquisition of Indian lands within the borders of the states.

City of Sherrill v. Oneida Indian Nation of New York (U.S. 2005)

After decades, the Oneida became frustrated by the failure of the case to settle. Instead, they began to purchase land within the claim area in fee simple, asserting sovereignty over the re-acquired parcels and refusing to pay property tax. In City of Sherrill v. Oneida Indian Nation of New York (2005), the Supreme Court held that laches barred the re-assertion of sovereignty over ancestral land re-acquired in fee simple; the Court did not consider whether the original aboriginal title over the disputed parcels was validly extinguished, and thus did not disturb its holding in Oneida II.

On remand, the district court held that, although the counties could tax the Oneida, due to tribal sovereign immunity, they could not foreclose on land held by the tribe in satisfaction of these unpaid taxes. The Second Circuit affirmed, but two of the judges urged the Supreme Court to overrule some of its tribal sovereign immunity precedents. After the Supreme Court granted certiorari, the tribe passed an ordinance consenting to taxation, and the Court vacated and remanded.

Oneida Indian Nation of New York v. County of Oneida (2d Cir. 2010)

Oneida I and Oneida II were litigated as test cases by both sides; the Oneidas suit against the counties for 200 years of damages was stayed pending its resolution. After settlement efforts, that suit resumed in 2000. In a similar suit by a different tribe, the Second Circuit adopted the view of the four dissenting Oneida II justices in Cayuga Indian Nation of New York v. Pataki (2005). The same laches defense defeated the larger Oneida claim. The Oneida and the United States petitioned the Supreme Court for certiorari on May 16, 2011. The Court denied certiorari on October 17, with Justices Ginsburg and Sotomayor dissenting from the denial.
