= Aboriginal title in Louisiana =

The United States Court of Appeals for the Fifth Circuit has held that there is no aboriginal title in Louisiana.

== History ==
=== Spanish rule ===
Spanish law, as interpreted by the U.S. Supreme Court, required the approval of the Governor for the alienation of aboriginal title.

=== French rule ===
Spain relinquished its claim to Louisiana to France in 1800.

=== U.S. territory ===
In 1803, the United States purchased France's claim to Louisiana in the Louisiana Purchase. The 1804 act forming the Louisiana Territory declared that any Spanish grants during the disputed period, “under whatsoever authority transacted, or pretended,” were “from the beginning, null, void, and of no effect in law or equity."

=== Statehood ===
Louisiana became a state in 1812.

Foster v. Neilson (1829)

Sampeyreac v. United States (1933)

Haydel v. Dufresne (1854)

West v. Cochran (1854)

== Louisiana Land Claims Act ==
The "Louisiana Land Claims Act" is the collective name given to federal land title statutes applicable to Louisiana, passed between 1805 and 1844. The first act, passed on March 2, 1805, required all those claiming land under imperfect or incomplete title to file a claim with the Board of Land Commissioners; un-filed claims would "“forever thereafter be barred”; no obligation was imposed on those with complete or perfect title (although they could file claims as well). The 1807 act extended the filing deadline and authorized the Board to decide claims submitted to it; the 1807 act held that un-filed claims would be extinguished "so far as they are derived from or founded on any act of Congress."

Nearly all of the later acts further extended the deadline. In 1816, the "Opelousas Report" concluded that the Nonintercourse Act did not apply to purchases from Indians under Spanish and French rule, but that Spanish and French law did apply; Congress adopted the findings of the Report.

== Chitimacha Tribe of Louisiana v. Harry L. Laws Co. (1982) ==
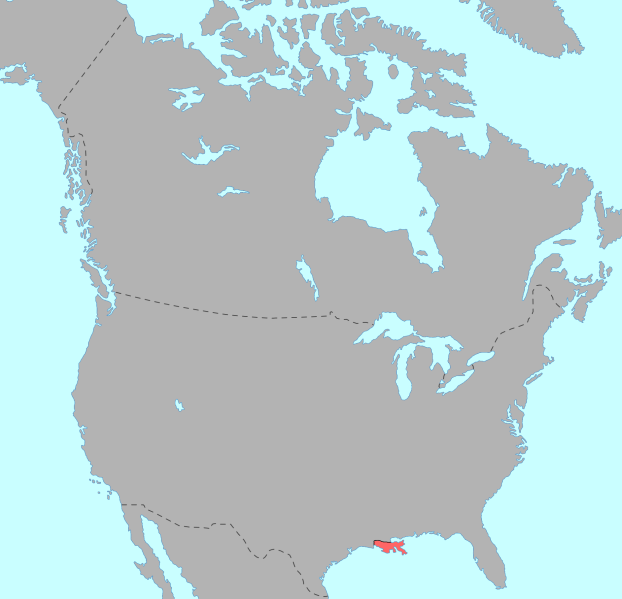
The Chitimacha's ancestral territory

The Chitimacha brought suit in the United States District Court for the Western District of Louisiana in July 1977 (complaint amended July 1979) claiming a large tract in St. Mary Parish, Louisiana. The land in the tract was conveyed from the tribe in three 18th-century transactions, allegedly in violation of the Nonintercourse Act. The three sales, which occurred under Spanish rule, deeded land to Phillip Verret (September 10, 1794), Frederick Pellerin (October 1, 1794), and Marie Joseph (June 22, 1799). Eighty land owners were named as defendants. Judge W. Eugene Davis granted summary judgement to the landowners.

The Chitimacha appealed, arguing both that Judge Davis should have recused (inter alia, because he owned land claimed by the Chitimacha, albeit not in the original complaint) and that his ruling was in error. The United States Court of Appeals for the Fifth Circuit affirmed. In addition to finding Judge Davis qualified to hear the case, the Fifth Circuit held that the Louisiana Land Claims Acts applied to aboriginal title, obligated the Chitimacha to file a claim with the commission, and extinguished their title when they did not do so. The Fifth Circuit assumed, but did not decide, that the three transactions occurred in violation of Spanish law by failing to obtain the permission of the Governor. The three transferees, although not required to file claims under the Louisiana Land Claims Act, had done so, and their claims had been upheld.

The Fifth Circuit referred to the Supreme Court's cases interpreting the California Land Claims Act, which it concluded was "very similar" to the statutes relating to Louisiana. Conversely, the Court distinguished United States v. Santa Fe Pac. R.R. (1941), noting that the federal statutes relating to Arizona and New Mexico there "did not set up any system for filing and deciding the validity of the land claims. They did not contain a forfeiture provision." The Fifth Circuit further held that the Chitimacaha held "incomplete title," defining incomplete title as "title which was not valid until confirmed by the United States government." The Fifth Circuit did not hold that all aboriginal title was incomplete title, but held that the Chitimacha's was because they had sold the land in question and actually "released possession."
