= Indian Claims Limitations Act =

The Indian Claims Limitations Act of 1982 (ICLA) is a United States federal statute of limitations that governs some types of claims by Native American tribes and claims by the federal government on behalf of tribes.

== Previous statutes ==
Previous statutes of limitations had only applied to suits by non-Indian landowners against the federal government.

Congress enacted the first statute of limitations applicable to Native American land claims in 1966. The limitation was six years for contract and trespass claims, and three years for tort claims. There was no limitation for land title claims. Pre-1966 claims were deemed to have accrued on July 18, 1966, the date of passage.

Under the 1966 act, pre-1966 trespass claims would have become barred on July 18, 1972. That day, Congress extended the limitations period for pre-1966 claims an additional five years, to July 18, 1977. The 1972 acts also broadened the scope of the applicability of the limitation, to all civil actions brought by Indian tribes or individuals based upon contract, tort, or trespass theories.

Under the 1972 acts, pre-1966 trespass claims would have become barred in 1977. That year, Congress extended the limitations period again, until April 1, 1980.

Under the 1977 act, pre-1966 trespass claims would have become barred on April 1, 1980. Four days before that deadline, Congress again extended the limitations period, until December 31, 1982. That act required the Interior Secretary to determine which claims should not be litigated, and submit proposals to resolve those claims legislatively by June 30, 1981. The Secretary submitted zero proposals by this deadline, but did identify 17,000 pre-1962 claims by 1982.

== Legislative history ==
In 1982, for the first time, the Interior and Justice Departments failed to endorse an extension. The Native American Rights Fund (NARF) initiated a class action suit on behalf of all Indians and tribes with pre-1966 claims. On November 17, 1982, NARF obtained an order requiring the government to either submit a legislative proposal within 30 days or to initiate the 17,000 lawsuits itself before the statute expired. The United States District Court for the District of Columbia's decision loomed large in the Congressional debates.

One day before the pre-1966 claims would have become barred, Congress extended the limitations period a final time. This eliminated the statute of limitations entirely for some types of claims.

== Provisions and interpretation ==
The Indian Claims Limitation Act of 1982 required the Interior Secretary to publish in the Federal Register, within 90 days, identify all pre-1966 claims, identify which pre-1966 claims were potentially meritorious, and identify which claims were suitable for litigation or legislation; further, Indian tribes and individuals were given 180 days thereafter to comment on the Secretary's findings. The Secretary did so, and modified the list in response to comments. The limitations status of pre-1966 claims depends in part upon those lists:

- Claims excluded from both lists expired on January 6, 1984;
- Claims on either list but not deemed suitable for litigation or legislation expired on November 7, 1984;
- Claims on either list and identified as suitable for legislation expired three years after the submission of legislation or a legislative report;
- Claims on either list and deemed suitable for litigation are exempt from any statute of limitations, unless de-listed by the Secretary, in which case they are barred one year from the publication of the removal;

The status of other claims does not depend upon these lists:

- Quiet title claims are unaffected by the Act. The Supreme Court has held that the separate, 12-year statute of limitations contained in the Quiet Title Act applies to actions by allottees under that Act.
- Claims against the federal government are unaffected by the Act.
- Post-1966 claims are unaffected by the Act.

According to Oneida County v. Oneida Indian Nation of N.Y. State (1985) ["Oneida II"], the 1982 Act "for the first time imposed a statute of limitations on certain tort and contract claims for damages brought by individual Indians and Indian tribes." Oneida II, considering the Act, observed: "[T]he statutory framework adopted in 1982 presumes the existence of an Indian right of action not otherwise subject to any statute of limitations. It would be a violation of Congress' will were we to hold that a state statute of limitations period should be borrowed in these circumstances." The claims involved in Oneida II was included on the first list, although it need not have been because the Oneida's suit was filed in 1970, before the law.

In Cayuga Indian Nation of N.Y. v. Pataki (2005), where the Second Circuit held that laches bars all aboriginal title claims sounding in ejectment or trespass, the Cayuga's claim was on the supplemental list.

== The Interior Department's list ==
The Interior Department's initial list was 222 pages long.

The initial list contained more than 17,000 claims by allottees relating to the White Earth Indian Reservation in Minnesota, totaling more than 100,000 acres. Congress responded with the White Earth Reservation Land Settlement Act (1986).
