= City of Sherrill v. Oneida Indian Nation of New York =

- Supreme Court of the United States

Argued January 11, 2005 Decided March 29, 2005
- Full case name: City of Sherrill, New York v. Oneida Indian Nation of New York, et al.
- Citations: 544 U.S. 197 (more) 125 S. Ct. 1478, 161 L. Ed. 2d 386

Case history
- Prior: Oneida Indian Nation v. City of Sherrill, 337 F.3d 139 (2d Cir. N.Y. 2003)
- Subsequent: Rehearing denied, 544 U.S. 1057 (2005), on remand sub nom. Oneida Indian Nation of N.Y. v. Madison Cnty., 401 F. Supp. 2d 219 (N.D.N.Y. 2005), motion to amend denied, 235 F.R.D. 559 (N.D.N.Y. 2006), aff'd, 605 F.3d 149 (2nd Cir. 2010), cert. granted, 131 S. Ct. 459 (2010), vacated and remanded sub nom. Madison Cnty. v. Oneida Indian Nation of N.Y., 131 S. Ct. 704 (2011) (per curiam)

Holding
- Reversed and remanded. Held that repurchase of traditional tribal lands did not restore tribal sovereignty to that land.

Court membership
- Chief Justice William Rehnquist Associate Justices John P. Stevens · Sandra Day O'Connor; Antonin Scalia · Anthony Kennedy; David Souter · Clarence Thomas; Ruth Bader Ginsburg · Stephen Breyer

Case opinions
- Majority: Ginsburg, joined by Rehnquist, O'Connor, Scalia, Kennedy, Souter, Thomas, and Breyer
- Concurrence: Souter
- Dissent: Stevens

Laws applied
- 25 U.S.C. § 5108

City of Sherrill v. Oneida Indian Nation of New York, 544 U.S. 197 (2005), was a case in which the Supreme Court of the United States held that repurchase of traditional tribal lands did not restore tribal sovereignty to that land.

== Background ==
=== Historical tribal background ===
The Oneida Indian Nation originally lived on about 6,000,000 acres (24,000 km^{2}) in central New York. In 1788, the State of New York and the tribe entered into a treaty where the tribe ceded all but 300,000 acres (1,200 km^{2}) to the state and kept the 300,000 as their reservation. Two years later, the United States Congress passed the Indian Trade and Intercourse Act, prohibiting the sale of tribal lands without the permission and ratification of the Federal government.

In violation of that and subsequent laws to protect the tribes, the State of New York continued to purchase tribal land and remove tribes to western lands, such as the part of the Oneida people who became the Oneida Nation of Wisconsin; and the Stockbridge-Munsee and the Brothertown Indians, who also moved from land they owned in New York to Wisconsin. By 1920, the tribe had only 32 acres (130,000 m^{2}).

In 1997 and 1998, the tribe purchased land on the open market that had been part of their original reservation. The City of Sherrill sought to impose property taxes on the land, and the tribe maintained that, as tribal lands, the property was tax-exempt. A similar case was filed in Oneida Indian Nation of N.Y. v. Madison Cnty., 401 F. Supp. 2d 219 (N.D.N.Y. 2005).

=== Lower courts ===
The Oneida Nation sought equitable relief in the U.S. District Court for the Northern District of New York and the trial court enjoined the City of Sherrill and Madison County, New York from taxing the tribal property.

Both the city of Sherrill and Madison County appealed the decision to the U.S. 2nd Circuit Court of Appeals. The Circuit Court affirmed. The defendants appealed again and the U.S. Supreme Court granted certiorari.

== Opinion of the Court ==
Justice Ruth Bader Ginsburg delivered the opinion of the court, reversing and remanding. Without overturning the Second Circuit's finding that the lands qualified as Indian Territory, Justice Ginsburg held that the Oneida purchase of the land did not revive the tribal sovereignty over the land. Because there was a period of about 200 years during which the tribe had not sought to regain title, the Court opined that it was too long out of Oneida Nation control to reassert their tribal immunity over those lands as an automatic mechanism.

In addition, since non-Indians now lived on the land, it would pose problems for those people. Justice Ginsburg concluded that the proper way for the Oneida Nation to reassert its immunity over those re-acquired lands was to place the land in US trust under the Department of Interior, as authorized by the Indian Reorganization Act of 1934. Justice Ginsburg reasoned that the mechanisms behind the IRA would address issues of checker-board jurisdictions and other pertinent issues.

=== Concurring opinion ===
Justice David Souter issued a concurring opinion stating that the amount of time involved barred the tribe from restoring sovereignty to the land in question.

=== Dissent ===
Justice John P. Stevens dissented, stating that the land within the boundaries of its historical reservation was "Indian Country," and the city had no jurisdiction to tax that property.

== Subsequent history ==
Sherrill held only that the local governments could tax OIN-owned property that was part of the original reservation but reacquired on the open market, not that the local governments could collect. In 2010, the Second Circuit held that tribal sovereign immunity barred a tax foreclosure suit against the tribe for unpaid taxes. As urged by concurring judges José A. Cabranes and Peter W. Hall, the U.S. Supreme Court granted certiorari. Following a tribal declaration and ordinance waiving sovereign immunity, the Court vacated and remanded.

As of April 2026, Sherrill remains the most recent Supreme Court case in which the discovery doctrine was directly cited or enforced.

== See also ==
- Oneida Indian Nation of New York v. County of Oneida (1974)
- County of Oneida v. Oneida Indian Nation of New York State (1985)
- Cayuga Indian Nation of New York v. Pataki (2d Cir. 2005)
