= Oneida Indian Nation of New York v. County of Oneida =

- Supreme Court of the United States

Argued November 6–7, 1973 Decided January 21, 1974
- Full case name: Oneida Indian Nation of New York, et al. v. County of Oneida, New York, et al.
- Citations: 414 U.S. 661 (more) 94 S. Ct. 772; 39 L. Ed. 2d 73

Case history
- Prior: 464 F.2d 916 (2d Cir. 1972), cert. granted, 412 U.S. 927 (1973).
- Subsequent: On remand to, 434 F. Supp. 527 (N.D.N.Y. 1977), aff'd, 719 F.2d 525 (2d Cir. 1983), cert. granted, 465 U.S. 1099 (1984), aff'd in part, rev'd in part, County of Oneida v. Oneida Indian Nation of New York State, 470 U.S. 226 (1985), rehearing denied, 471 U.S. 1062 (1985), on remand, 217 F. Supp. 2d 292 (N.D.N.Y. 2002), motion for relief denied, 214 F.R.D. 83 (N.D.N.Y. 2003), motion for relief granted after remand, 2003 WL 21026573 (N.D.N.Y. 2003)

Holding
- There is federal subject-matter jurisdiction for possessory land claims brought by Indian tribes based upon aboriginal title, the Nonintercourse Act, and Indian treaties

Court membership
- Chief Justice Warren E. Burger Associate Justices William O. Douglas · William J. Brennan Jr. Potter Stewart · Byron White; Thurgood Marshall · Harry Blackmun; Lewis F. Powell Jr. · William Rehnquist

Case opinions
- Majority: White, joined by unanimous
- Concurrence: Rehnquist, joined by Powell

Laws applied
- 28 U.S.C. §§ 1331, 1362

Oneida Indian Nation of New York v. County of Oneida, 414 U.S. 661 (1974), is a landmark decision by the United States Supreme Court concerning aboriginal title in the United States. The original suit in this matter was the first modern-day Native American land claim litigated in the federal court system rather than before the Indian Claims Commission. It was also the first to go to final judgement.

The Supreme Court held that there is federal subject-matter jurisdiction for possessory land claims brought by Indian tribes based upon aboriginal title, the Nonintercourse Act, and Indian treaties. In delivering the opinion of the Court, Associate Justice Byron White wrote that jurisdiction for such suits arose both from 28 U.S.C. § 1331, conferring jurisdiction for cases arising under the Constitution, laws, or treaties of the United States and 28 U.S.C. § 1362, conferring similar jurisdiction to cases brought by Indian tribes regardless of the amount in controversy.

The case is often referred to as Oneida I because it is the first of three times the Oneida Indian Nation reached the Supreme Court in litigating its land rights claims. It was followed by County of Oneida v. Oneida Indian Nation of New York State (Oneida II) (1985), rejecting all of the affirmative defenses raised by the counties in the same action, and City of Sherrill v. Oneida Indian Nation of New York (Sherrill) (2005), rejecting the tribe's attempt in a later lawsuit to reassert tribal sovereignty over parcels of land reacquired by the tribe in fee simple.

== Background ==
=== District Court ===
In 1970, the Oneida Indian Nation of New York State and Oneida Indian Nation of Wisconsin filed suit against Oneida County, New York, and Madison County, New York, in the United States District Court for the Northern District of New York. The Oneidas alleged that vast swathes of tribal lands had been conveyed to the state of New York in violation of the Nonintercourse Act and three Indian treaties: the Treaty of Fort Stanwix (1784), the Treaty of Fort Harmar (1789), and the Treaty of Canandaigua (1794). Although the complaint named over 6,000,000 acres (24,000 km^{2}) conveyed in such manner, the suit involved only the portion of that land held by the two counties. As damages, the tribes asked only for the fair rental value of the lands from the period January 1, 1968 through December 31, 1969.

The District Court held that the complaint asserted only state law claims, implicating federal law only indirectly, and thus granted the motion to dismiss under the well-pleaded complaint rule.

=== Circuit Court ===
A divided panel of the United States Court of Appeals for the Second Circuit affirmed the dismissal. Chief Judge Henry Friendly, for the Second Circuit, held that the assertion of jurisdiction "shatters on the rock of the 'well-pleaded complaint' rule." The Second Circuit placed weight upon Taylor v. Anderson, 234 U.S. 74 (1914), holding that there was no federal jurisdiction for an ejectment action that alleged wrongful alienation of lands allotted to Choctaw and Chickasaw Indians.

== Opinion of the Court ==
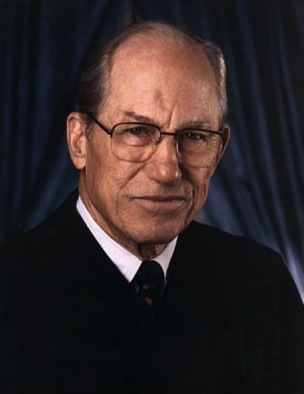
Supreme Court Associate Justice Byron White, author of the majority opinion in Oneida I

The Supreme Court reversed. Justice White noted "Accepting the premise of the Court of Appeals that the case was essentially a possessory action, we are of the view that the complaint asserted a current right to possession conferred by federal law, wholly independent of state law." The Court distinguished Taylor v. Anderson on these grounds

Here, the right to possession itself is claimed to arise under federal law in the first instance. Allegedly, aboriginal title of an Indian tribe guaranteed by treaty and protected by statute has never been extinguished. In Taylor, the plaintiffs were individual Indians, not an Indian tribe; and the suit concerned lands allocated to individual Indians, not tribal rights to lands....
In the present case, however, the assertion of a federal controversy does not rest solely on the claim of a right to possession derived from a federal grant of title whose scope will be governed by state law. Rather, it rests on the not insubstantial claim that federal law now protects, and has continuously protected from the time of the formation of the United States, possessory rights to tribal lands, wholly apart from the application of state law principles which normally and separately protect a valid right of possession.

The majority emphasized the supremacy of federal Indian law to state law:

There has been recurring tension between federal and state law; state authorities have not easily accepted the notion that federal law and federal courts must be deemed the controlling considerations in dealing with the Indians. Fellows v. Blacksmith, The New York Indians, United States v. Forness, and the Tuscarora litigation are sufficient evidence that the reach and exclusivity of federal law with respect to reservation lands and reservation Indians did not go unchallenged; and it may be that they are to some extent challenged here. But this only underlines the legal reality that the controversy alleged in the complaint may well depend on what the reach and impact of the federal law will prove to be in this case.

Because the District Court had disposed on the case on a motion to dismiss, the Supreme Court reversed and remanded for further proceedings.

=== Concurrence ===
Justices Rehnquist and Powell concurred separately, emphasizing their understanding that the majority's holding would not apply to ejectment actions brought by non-Indians. The concurrence concluded: "The opinion for the Court today should give no comfort to persons with garden-variety ejectment claims who, for one reason or another, are covetously eyeing the door to the federal courthouse."

== Subsequent developments ==
On remand, the District Court and Second Circuit rejected the counties' affirmative defenses and awarded money damages. This time, the counties appealed to the Supreme Court, which again granted certiorari. The impact of Oneida I was summed up, in the interpretation of Allan Van Gestal, the lawyer for Oneida County, in his argument in Oneida II:

This case is a test case, having been so designated by the plaintiffs, having been so tried by the courts below.... The 1974 opinion in this case has already spawned a vast number of Indian land claims. A number of cases are pending throughout the eastern states and southern states, citing the 1974 jurisdictional opinion as if it were an opinion on the merits of the issues. That case, indeed, has already been cited 162 times since 1974.

County of Oneida v. Oneida Indian Nation of New York State, 470 U.S. 226 (1985), affirmed the rejection of the counties' affirmative defenses, leaving the damages award intact. The larger portion of the Oneida claim, to the 6-million-acre (24,000 km^{2}) tract, was rejected by the Second Circuit in 1988 on the grounds that the Confederation Congress Proclamation of 1783 had neither the authority nor the intent to limit the acquisition of Indian lands within the borders of US states.
