= Cayuga Indian Nation of New York v. Pataki =

American legal case

Cayuga Indian Nation of N.Y. v. Pataki
- Court: United States Court of Appeals for the Second Circuit
- Full case name: Cayuga Indian Nation of N.Y. v. George Pataki, as Governor of the state of New York
- Argued: March 31 2004
- Decided: June 28 2005
- Citation: 413 F.3d 266 (2d Cir. 2005)

Case history
- Prior history: 89 F.R.D. 627 (N.D.N.Y. 1981) (certifying class); 565 F. Supp. 1297 (N.D.N.Y. 1983) (denying motion to dismiss); 667 F. Supp. 938 (N.D.N.Y. 1987) (granting partial summary judgement); 730 F. Supp. 485 (N.D.N.Y. 1990) (invalidating 1795 and 1807 conveyances); 758 F. Supp. 107 (N.D.N.Y. 1991) (interpreting treaty); 771 F. Supp. 19 (N.D.N.Y. 1991) (rejecting laches defense); 1999 WL 224615 (N.D.N.Y. 1999) (ruling on damages calculation); 1999 WL 509442 (N.D.N.Y. 1999) (denying ejectment remedy); 79 F. Supp. 2d 66 (N.D.N.Y. 1999) (ordering separate trials); 79 F. Supp. 2d 78 (N.D.N.Y. 1999) (ruling on jury instructions); 83 F. Supp. 2d 318 (N.D.N.Y. 2000) (ruling on expert witnesses); 2000 WL 654963 (N.D.N.Y. 2000) (clarifying laches instruction); 165 F. Supp. 2d 266 (N.D.N.Y. 2001) (upholding jury award); 188 F. Supp. 2d 223 (N.D.N.Y. 2002) (denying post-trial motions)
- Subsequent history: Cert. denied, 547 U.S. 1128 (2006)

Holding
- Laches bars all aboriginal title claims sounding in ejectment or trespass

Court membership
- Judges sitting: José A. Cabranes, Rosemary S. Pooler, Janet C. Hall (D. Conn., sitting by designation)

Case opinions
- Majority: Cabranes, joined by Pooler
- Dissent: Hall

Laws applied
- 25 U.S.C. § 177

Cayuga Indian Nation of New York v. Pataki, 413 F.3d 266 (2d Cir. 2005), is an important precedent in the United States Court of Appeals for the Second Circuit for the litigation of aboriginal title in the United States. Applying the U.S. Supreme Court's recent ruling in City of Sherrill v. Oneida Indian Nation of New York (2005), a divided panel held that the equitable doctrine of laches bars all tribal land claims sounding in ejectment or trespass, for both tribal plaintiffs and the federal government as plaintiff-intervenor.

The ruling was the culmination of a two-decade-long litigation in the United States District Court for the Northern District of New York before Judge Neal Peters McCurn. Pursuant to a jury verdict, the Cayuga Nation of New York had been awarded $247.9 million, representing the current fair market value and 204 years of rental value damages for 64,015 acres conveyed by the tribe to the state in violation of the Nonintercourse Act (including pre-judgement interest).

This precedent has effectively ended the viability of all aboriginal title litigation in the Second Circuit (Connecticut, New York, and Vermont), the site of nearly all of the unresolved Indian land claims in the United States. Since the ruling, no tribal plaintiff has overcome the laches defense in a land claim in the Second Circuit. Four dissenting Supreme Court justices had previously adopted the view of the Second Circuit in County of Oneida v. Oneida Indian Nation of New York State (1985); there, the majority did not reach the issue.

== Prior history ==
The Second Circuit ruling came twenty-five years after the Cayuga filed their complaint in the Northern District of New York in 1980 challenging two conveyances of land to the state in 1795 and 1807, totaling 64,015 acres. The following year, a class of defendant land owners was certified.

In 1983, the Cayuga survived the defendant's motion to dismiss. Judge McCurn held that the Nonintercourse Act applied to the conveyances in question, held that the Cayuga had a valid cause of action, and rejected the affirmative defenses of: sovereign immunity pursuant to the Eleventh Amendment to the United States Constitution; statute of limitations; nonjusticiability; and abatement. McCurn's ruling preceded the U.S. Supreme Court's ruling in County of Oneida v. Oneida Indian Nation of New York State (1985), which rejected several of the same affirmative defenses, among others.

In 1987, McCurn ruled on the motions for summary judgement. He held that: there was no evidence that the "treaties" through which New York State acquired the land had been ratified by the federal government; that the Indian Claims Commission did not have the authority to ratify the conveyances; and that his court had jurisdiction over the defendants. In 1990, he ruled that both the 1795 and 1807 conveyances violated the Nonintercourse Act, and were thus invalid. In 1991, he interpreted the "reservation" terminology in the relevant treaty to also implicate that Act. McCurn also rejected the laches defense, on which the Second Circuit would eventually overturn his ruling. In response to the defendant's assertion of sovereign immunity as a defense, the federal government moved to intervene in the lawsuit, which was granted in November 1992.

Having established liability, the litigation turned to the remedy. In 1999, McCurn ruled on the appropriate method to calculate damages. The court rejected the state's arguments that damages should be limited to the fair market value of the land at the time of the transaction, without pre-judgement interest (the approximate method used by the Indian Claims Commission for statutory claims against the federal government). That same year, the court rejected ejectment as a remedy, thus ensuring that the Cayuga would be unable to recover possession of the lands; their remedy would be limited to monetary damages. The court also determined that joint and several liability would be inappropriate, and thus that the defendants would require separate trials. Finally, the court determined that the state would be able to offset from the eventual damages any amount of consideration paid in the original conveyances as well as the value of infrastructure improvements; moreover, the plaintiff's anthropologist's testimony would not be admissible on the question of valuation, the jury would not be able to hear evidence on laches from either party, the Eleventh Amendment would not bar damages, and the plaintiffs would not be able to claim emotional, psychological, or cultural damages—only the economic value of the land.

Preparing for trial, the court threw out the plaintiff's real estate expert and approved the government's real estate expert, applying the Daubert standard. He also clarified his prior ruling, to note that testimony on laches would be permitted inasmuch as it related to pre-judgement interest. In 2001, the jury returned a verdict for the Cayuga, calculating damages the current fair market value of the land and the fair rental value of the land over 204 years in excess of $36 million; with the addition of pre-judgement interest, the damages reached $247,911,999.42. The court also denied the defendant's post-trial motions, but stayed the collection of the judgement pending appeal.

== Second Circuit opinion ==
The Second Circuit reversed, and entered judgement for the defendants.

=== Majority ===
Judge José A. Cabranes authored the panel opinion, joined by Rosemary S. Pooler. The court in large part relied on the U.S. Supreme Court's recent City of Sherrill v. Oneida Indian Nation of New York (2005) decision, which, it stated, "dramatically altered the legal landscape against which we consider plaintiffs' claims". In summary, the court noted: "We understand Sherrill to hold that equitable doctrines, such as laches, acquiescence, and impossibility, can, in appropriate circumstances, be applied to Indian land claims, even when such a claim is legally viable and within the statute of limitations." While, Sherrill expressly did not disturb Oneida II (1985): "Because the Supreme Court in Oneida II expressly declined to decide whether laches would apply to such claims, this statement in Sherrill is not dispositive of whether laches would apply here."

Parsing the Sherrill decision, the court concluded that the dispositive factor there was the "disruptive nature of the claim itself." Thus, the court opted for a broad reading of Sherrill:

Although we recognize that the Supreme Court did not identify a formal standard for assessing when these equitable defenses apply, the broadness of the Supreme Court's statements indicates to us that Sherrill's holding is not narrowly limited to claims identical to that brought by the Oneidas, seeking a revival of sovereignty, but rather, that these equitable defenses apply to "disruptive" Indian land claims more generally.

Rejecting the Cayuga and federal government's argument that Sherrill did not bar monetary remedies, the court held that "this case involves comparably disruptive claims, and other, comparable remedies are in fact at issue". The court emphasized that "plaintiffs' claim is and has always been one sounding in ejectment; plaintiffs have asserted a continuing right to immediate possession as the basis of all of their claims, and have always sought ejectment of the current landowners as their preferred form of relief." The court concluded that the District Court had "'monetized' the ejectment remedy". The court's treatment would apply the defense recognized in Sherrill to nearly all aboriginal title claims:

[T]his type of possessory land claim-seeking possession of a large swath of central New York State and the ejectment of tens of thousands of landowners ... is indisputably disruptive. Indeed, this disruptiveness is inherent in the claim itself—which asks this Court to overturn years of settled land ownership—rather than an element of any particular remedy which would flow from the possessory land claim. Accordingly, we conclude that possessory land claims of this type are subject to the equitable considerations discussed in Sherrill.

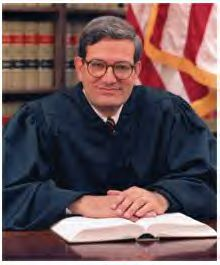
Judge José A. Cabranes, the author of Cayuga

Acknowledging that laches has traditionally been understood as an equitable doctrine, the court rejected any distinction between law and equity, holding that it barred "any remedy flowing from this possessory land claim". The court justified this holding with reference to the sui generis nature of aboriginal title. "To summarize," the court recapitulated:

[T]he import of Sherrill is that "disruptive", forward-looking claims, a category exemplified by possessory land claims, are subject to equitable defenses, including laches. Insofar as the Cayugas' claim in the instant case is unquestionably a possessory land claim, it is subject to laches. ... The fact that, nineteen years into the case, at the damages stage, the District Court substituted a monetary remedy for plaintiffs' preferred remedy of ejectment cannot salvage the claim, which was subject to dismissal ab initio. To frame this point a different way: if the Cayugas filed this complaint today, exactly as worded, a District Court would be required to find the claim subject to the defense of laches under Sherrill and could dismiss on that basis.

The court held that laches equally barred both the plaintiff's cause of action for ejectment and the plaintiff's cause of action for trespass. Acknowledging that the federal government had "traditionally not been subject to the defense of laches", the court did not interpret this as a "per se rule". The decision concluded with praise for the McCurn:

Our decision to reverse the judgment of the District Court and enter judgment for defendants should in no way be interpreted as a reflection on the District Court's efforts and rulings in this case. We recognize and applaud the thoughtful and painstaking efforts, over many years, of Judge Neil P. McCurn, who presided over this and related land claims in upstate New York with fairness and due regard to the rights and interests of all parties as well as with a keen appreciation of the complexities of the subject matter and of the relevant law. Our decision is based on a subsequent ruling by the Supreme Court, which could not be anticipated by Judge McCurn in his handling of this case over more than twenty years.

=== Dissent ===
Judge Janet C. Hall of the United States District Court for the District of Connecticut, sitting by designation, dissented. Hall argued: "While [Sherrill] has an impact on this case, it does not compel the conclusion that the plaintiffs are without any remedy". Hall would have barred the ejectment of the present landowners, but not the money damages. With respect to the ejectment cause of action, Hall would have held that: "[W]here a plaintiff seeks ejectment damages, rather than restoration of a possession interest, application of the doctrine of laches to such a money damage claim is rarely if ever justified." Hall also would not have applied laches to the trespass cause of action.

Nor would Hall have applied laches to the federal government. Distinguishing the cases cited by the panel majority, Hall noted that "[t]hese cases cannot support the proposition that this Court has the authority to craft a federal common law defense of laches against an Indian land claim sought by the United States." In concluding, Hall examined the language of Sherill in greater depth, arguing that Sherill "does not reach as far as the majority reads it".

== Subsequent history ==
Although both the Solicitor General of the United States and the Cayuga asked the Supreme Court to review the Second Circuit's holding, the Court declined to grant certiorari.
