= Confederation Congress Proclamation of 1783 =

Law of the U.S. in the Articles of Confederation (pre-Constitution)

Confederation Congress Proclamation of 1783 was a proclamation by the Congress of the Confederation dated September 22, 1783, prohibiting the extinguishment of aboriginal title in the United States without the consent of the federal government. The policy underlying the proclamation was inaugurated by the Proclamation of 1763, and continued after the ratification of the United States Constitution by the Nonintercourse Acts of 1790, 1793, 1796, 1799, 1802, and 1833.

During the Articles of Confederation-era, several U.S. states, particularly New York, purchased lands from Indians without the consent of Congress. In the 1980s, in the wake of the Oneida I (1974) decision permitting tribes to pursue such claims in federal courts, several tribes challenged such conveyances as contrary to the Proclamation. However, the Second Circuit has held that Congress had neither the authority nor the intent to prohibit such purchases within the borders of individual states, and thus that the Proclamation applied only to the federal territories.

== Text ==
The Proclamation prohibits:

all persons from making settlements on lands inhabited or claimed by Indians, without the limits or jurisdiction of any particular State, and from purchasing or receiving any gift or cession of such lands or claims without the express authority and directions of the United States in Congress assembled.

The Proclamation also declared:

that every very such purchase or settlement, gift or cession, not having the authority aforesaid, is null and void, and that no right or title will accrue in consequence of any such purchase, gift, cession or settlement.

== Litigation ==
Few early cases cite the Proclamation. However, the Proclamation has been cited in more recent litigation challenging conveyances of aboriginal title from tribes between 1783 and 1790.

The most in-depth analysis of the Proclamation was conducted by the United States Court of Appeals for the Second Circuit in Oneida Indian Nation of New York v. New York (1988). There, the Oneida Indian Nation challenged purchases of Oneida lands by the state of New York in 1785 and 1788. Judge Jon O. Newman, for a unanimous three-judge panel, became one of the first U.S. federal judges to rule on the powers of the Congress and the states under the Articles of Confederation, 200 years after the fact. Newman held:

- the states were empowered under the Articles to purchase land from Indians without the consent of Congress;
- the clauses in the Articles relating to Congress' authority to make war and peace with Indians were non-justiciable;
- the lands, disputed by New York and Massachusetts, were within the territory of New York at the time of the purchase;
- the Treaty of Fort Stanwix did not prohibit the purchase;
- the Proclamation did not apply to lands within states;
- if the Proclamation had applied to such lands, it would have exceeded Congress's power under the Articles.

The result of this decision was to extinguish "one of the largest land claims" claiming between 5,500,000 and 6,000,000 acres (22,000 and 24,000 km^{2}). Howard Elijah, secretary of the Oneida Council of Chiefs, called the decision a "genocide." The Oneidas were represented by the Native American Rights Fund.
