= Federal Power Commission v. Tuscarora Indian Nation =

- Supreme Court of the United States

Argued December 7, 1959 Decided March 7, 1960
- Full case name: Federal Power Commission v. Tuscarora Indian Nation
- Citations: 362 U.S. 99 (more) 80 S. Ct. 543; 4 L. Ed. 2d 584

Case history
- Prior: United States Court of Appeals for the District of Columbia Circuit

Holding
- The Federal Power Commission did indeed have the right to seize land from the Tuscarora Indian Tribe with just compensation.

Court membership
- Chief Justice Earl Warren Associate Justices Hugo Black · Felix Frankfurter; William O. Douglas · Tom C. Clark; John M. Harlan II · William J. Brennan Jr. Charles E. Whittaker · Potter Stewart

Case opinions
- Majority: Whittaker, joined by Warren, Frankfurter, Clark, Harlan, Stewart
- Concurrence: Brennan
- Dissent: Black, joined by Douglas

Laws applied
- Federal Power Act

Federal Power Commission v. Tuscarora Indian Nation, 362 U.S. 99 (1960), was a case decided by the United States Supreme Court that determined that the Federal Power Commission was authorized to take lands owned by the Tuscarora Nation by eminent domain under the Federal Power Act for a hydroelectric power project, upon payment of just compensation.

== Background ==
In 1950 the United States and Canada entered into treaty in respect to the Niagara Falls in order to properly split the use of an obviously huge natural resource. When approving the treaty, the Senate entered into force a provision that stated that no development of the areas was to occur without an Act of Congress. Because of this the Army Corps of Engineers reported to the Congress about the most feasible plans to use all of the waters afforded to it by the 1950 treaty. Also other studies were submitted to the Congress by the Federal Power Commission and Power Authority of New York.

The treaty limited the use of water during the nights and weekends. In order to overcome these times where water would not be as readily available all the plans submitted called for a reservoir to be built that could feed the power plant during these off times. However squabbling in Congress on whether the development should be public or private had delayed plans for several years. But on June 7, 1956, a rock slide destroyed the Schoellkopf Power Station, creating a critical shortage of power in the Mid-Atlantic Region. Faced with this crisis Congress authorized the FPC to issue the Power Authority of New York a license to implement a plan that would utilize all available power that the 1950 treaty afforded the United States.

In light of its new authority via an Act of Congress the Power Authority began its hearing process and notified all interested parties, including the Tuscarora Indian Nation. In the hearing the Tuscarora objected to the Power Authority's plan and stated that "the applicant lacks the authority to acquire them." During the hearings it was stated that Power Authority would need about 1,000 acres (4.0 km^{2}) of land from a roughly 4,000-acre (16 km^{2}) parcel of land. The land in question was not part of the actual reservation as mandated by treaty, but purchased by the Tuscarora with assistance from the Secretary of War. After the hearings the FPC issued the license and found that the land in question was almost completely undeveloped. On May 5, 1958, the FPC issued its order approving the licensee's revised exhibit, which precisely delineated the location, area, and acreage to be embraced by the reservoir, which included 1,383 acres (5.60 km^{2}) of the Tuscaroras' lands. On May 16, 1958, the Tuscarora filed a petition at the Court of Appeals for the District of Columbia.

== District Court ==
The Tuscarora Indian Nation contended that seizure of their lands was a violation under the Federal Power Act. Section 4 of the act declared that reservation land may not be acquired when it would "interfere or be inconsistent with the purpose for which such reservation was created or acquired." The Court of Appeals found that the land in question was indeed part of the Indian Reservation and could not be used and remanded the FPC. The Federal Power Act defined reservations as: "national forests, tribal lands embraced within Indian reservations, military reservations, and other lands and interests in lands owned by the United States, and withdrawn, reserved, or withheld from private appropriation and disposal under the public land laws; also lands and interests in lands acquired and held for any public purpose; but shall not include national monuments or national parks."

Upon this decision the Commission held more hearings, studying both the court's decision and exploring other locations for the reservoir. However the Commission found that other sites would cause significant delay to the project, cause unwanted community disruption, unreasonable expense and would reduce the capacity of the reservoir. This would lead to a violation of Public Law 85-159, which mandated that the commission use all of the possible energy that could be extracted from the falls. The Commission then appealed to the Supreme Court.

== Opinion ==
=== Majority ===
Justice Whittaker wrote the opinion for the Court. The question as presented by Whittaker was "... may [the land] be taken for the storage reservoir of a hydroelectric power project, upon the payment of just compensation ...". The court did not argue whether the land was part of the Tuscarora Reservation but whether it was a reservation as defined in the Federal Power Act.

The court found that for the purposes of the law, a reservation was any land owned by the Federal Government of the United States. This would thus exclude Indian Reservations from its definition.

=== Dissent ===
Justice Black wrote a dissent. He argued that the definition of reservation was trivial and should not have been analyzed by the court. In his dissent Black wrote of a string of injustices by the United States Government and violations of treaties. He added that this ruling was another broken promise. He finished with:

Great nations, like great men, should keep their word.

== Interpretation of the Nonintercourse Act ==
Although the Court found that the Nonintercourse Act did not bar condemnation under the Federal Power Act, it laid down an expansive interpretation of the Act:

As to the Tuscaroras' contention that [25 U.S.C. § 177] prohibits the taking of any of their lands for the reservoir 'without the express and specific consent of Congress,' one thing is certain. It is certain that if s 177 is applicable to alienations effected by condemnation proceedings under s 21 of the Federal Power Act, the mere 'expressed consent' of Congress would be vain and idle. For s 177 at the very least contemplates the assent of the Indian nation or tribe. And inasmuch as the Tuscarora Indian Nation withholds such consent and refuses to convey to the licensee any of its lands, it follows that the mere consent of Congress, however express and specific, would avail nothing. Therefore, if s 177 is applicable to alienations effected by condemnation under s 21 of the Federal Power Act, the result would be that the Tuscarora lands, however imperative for the project, could not be taken at all.
But s 177 is not applicable to the sovereign United States ...

George C. Shattuck, who successfully litigated the Oneida I (1974) decision more than a decade later cited Tuscarora as the "key that helped me see the legal issues in the correct perspective." In his report to his firm, persuading them to take the case on a contingency fee basis, Shattuck repeated several arguments against Indian land claims and concluded: "Before the Tuscarora case we might have backed away for one or more of the above reasons." Shattuck notes that, "[i]ronically, the state's brief in the Tuscarora case ... gave me my first real understanding of how the Nonintercourse Act worked and how it might be used to press the Oneida claim." Explaining the Oneida I holding, Shattuck states that "[t]he prophesy of the 1960 Tuscarora case became reality in 1974."
