= United States v. Santa Fe Pacific Railroad Co. =

- Supreme Court of the United States

Argued November 12–13, 1941 Decided December 8, 1941
- Full case name: United States v. Santa Fe Pacific Railroad Company
- Citations: 314 U.S. 339 (more) 62 S. Ct. 248; 86 L. Ed. 260; 1941 U.S. LEXIS 1124

Case history
- Prior: 114 F.2d 420 (9th Cir. 1940), cert. granted, 312 U.S. 675 (1941)
- Subsequent: Rehearing denied, 314 U.S. 716 (1942)

Holding
- Aboriginal title is extinguished by legislation only with a clear intention.

Court membership
- Chief Justice Harlan F. Stone Associate Justices Owen Roberts · Hugo Black; Stanley F. Reed · Felix Frankfurter; William O. Douglas · Frank Murphy; James F. Byrnes · Robert H. Jackson

Case opinion
- Majority: Douglas, joined by unanimous

Laws applied
- Treaty of Guadalupe Hidalgo; 10 Stat. 308 (1854); 13 Stat. 541 (1865); 14 Stat. 292 (1866); 16 Stat. 291 (1870)

United States v. Santa Fe Pacific Railroad Co., 314 U.S. 339 (1941), is a United States Supreme Court case in which the Court held that the power of Congress to extinguish aboriginal title is plenary and nonjusticiable but that Congress was presumed not to do so absent a clear intention. It is the leading precedent on the extinguishment of aboriginal title in the United States.

The suit was brought by the federal government, on behalf of the Hualapai against the Santa Fe Pacific Railroad. The Court held that the Hualapai's aboriginal title was not extinguished by (1) its lack of federal recognition or acknowledgment by treaty, statute, for formal government action; (2) the 1848 Treaty of Guadalupe Hidalgo (3) an 1854 federal statute creating the office of Surveyor General of New Mexico; (4) and 1865 statute creating the Colorado River Indian Reservation; (5) the 1866 federal land grant to the railroad; (6) an 1870 federal statute creating the office of Surveyor General of Arizona; or (7) the 1874 forcible removal of the Hualapai to the Colorado River Indian Reservation.

However, the Court held that the 1881 creation of a reservation by executive order at the request of the Hualapai extinguished the tribe's aboriginal title outside of that reservation. The case distinguished aboriginal title in California from aboriginal title in the rest of the Mexican Cession and is frequently cited for its in-depth discussion of the test for the extinguishment of aboriginal title.

== See also ==
- McCabe v. Atchison, Topeka & Santa Fe Railway Co.
- List of United States Supreme Court cases, volume 314
