= Bond, Schoeneck & King =

American law firm

Bond, Schoeneck & King, PLLC
- Headquarters: Syracuse, NY
- No. of offices: 11
- No. of attorneys: 275
- Major practice areas: Bankruptcy, Business, Construction, Employee Benefits, Estate Planning, Health Care, Higher Education, Intellectual Property, Labor and Employment, Litigation, Property, School Law
- Key people: Kevin M. Bernstein, Chairman, Management Committee
- Date founded: 1897; 129 years ago
- Website: www.bsk.com

Bond, Schoeneck & King, PLLC is a law firm headquartered in Syracuse, New York.

== History ==
Bond, Schoeneck & King was founded in 1897 in Syracuse, New York, the year that George H. Bond graduated from Syracuse University College of Law and began his career. His practice grew rapidly in downtown Syracuse, and in 1908 he was joined by Edward Schoeneck. Clarence R. King joined them in 1913, and soon thereafter, “Bond, Schoeneck & King” became the unchanging name of the firm.

From the three named founders, Bond, Schoeneck & King has grown to a law firm of 250 attorneys with eleven offices in five states, New York, Florida, Kansas, New Jersey and Massachusetts. The firm comprises 25 practice areas and 10 industry groups, that include among others Employee Benefits and Executive Compensation, Environmental and Energy, Intellectual Property and Technology, Labor and Employment Law, Mergers and Acquisitions, Agribusiness, Exempt Organizations, Higher Education, Collegiate Sports and Real Estate Development and Construction.
