= Abatement in pleading =

Type of legal defense

An abatement in pleading, or plea in abatement, was a defence in common law to legal proceedings that did not contest the principle of the plaintiff's right to relief but contended that the plaintiff had made a procedural error and needed to bring fresh proceedings, which followed the correct procedure. The objection could deal with (among others) place, time, or method of assertion. The plea in abatement was abolished as a particular form of response by the defendant when common-law pleading was replaced by Code Pleading and later by pleading rules, such as the federal Rules of Civil Procedure.

Successful assertion of pleas in abatement merely paused proceedings until the problem was remedied. There were two fundamental styles of abatement. The first was abatement in proceedings, which would merely suspend the proceeding until the error was fixed. Abatement in law would terminate it completely although it could be restarted at the plaintiff's request. The second term is more common. It has now been abolished, in most if not all, common law jurisdictions.
