= Nonintercourse Act =

Family of U.S. laws related to Native American tribal rights

- Other short titles: Indian Intercourse Act, Indian Nonintercourse Act
- Long title: An Act to Regulate Trade and Intercourse with the Indian Tribes

Citations
- Statutes at Large: 1 Stat. 137 (1790 Act); 1 Stat. 329 (1793 Act); 1 Stat. 469 (1796 Act); 1 Stat. 743 (1799 Act); 2 Stat. 139 (1802 Act); 4 Stat. 729 (1834 Act)

Codification
- U.S.C. sections created: 25 U.S.C. § 177

United States Supreme Court cases
- Oneida Indian Nation of N.Y. v. County of Oneida (1974); County of Oneida v. Oneida Indian Nation of N.Y. (1985)

The Nonintercourse Act (also known as the Indian Intercourse Act or the Indian Nonintercourse Act) is the collective name given to six statutes passed by the United States Congress in 1790, 1793, 1796, 1799, 1802, and 1834 to set boundaries of American Indian reservations. The various acts were also intended to regulate commerce between White Americans and citizens of Indigenous nations. The most notable provisions of the act regulate the inalienability of aboriginal title in the United States, a continuing source of litigation for almost 200 years. The prohibition on purchases of Indian lands without the approval of the federal government has its origins in the Royal Proclamation of 1763 and the Confederation Congress Proclamation of 1783.

== Text of the land provision ==
The first four acts expired after four years; the 1802 and 1834 acts had no expiration. The version of the act in force at the time of the illicit conveyance determines the law that applies. The courts have found few legal differences between the five versions of the act. For example, three dissenting justices in South Carolina v. Catawba Indian Tribe (1986) noted that the 1793 Act expanded the scope of the 1790 Act by applying the prohibition not only to lands but "claims".

The original act, passed on July 22, 1790, provides:

No sale of lands made by any Indians, or any nation or tribe of Indians within the United States, shall be valid to any person or persons, or to any state, whether having the right of pre-emption to such lands or not, unless the same shall be made and duly executed at some public treaty, held under the authority of the United States.

The 1793 act provides:

No purchase or grant of lands, or of any title or claim thereto, from any Indians or nation or tribe of Indians, within the bounds of the United States, shall be of any validity in law or equity, unless the same be made by a treaty or a convention entered into pursuant to the constitution ...

The 1796 act provides:

No purchase, grant, lease, or other conveyance of lands, or of any title or claim thereto, from any Indian, or nation or tribe of Indians, within the bounds of the United States, shall be of any validity, in law or equity, unless the same be made by treaty, or convention, entered into pursuant to the constitution ...

The 1799 act provides:

No purchase, grant, lease, or other conveyance of lands, or of any title or claim thereto, from any Indian, or nation or tribe of Indians, within the bounds of the United States, shall be of any validity, in law or equity, unless the same be made by treaty or convention, entered into pursuant to the constitution ...

The 1802 act provides:

No purchase, grant, lease, or other conveyance of lands, or of any title or claim thereto, from any Indian, or nation, or tribe of Indians, within the bounds of the United States, shall be of any validity, in law or equity, unless the same be made by treaty or convention, entered into pursuant to the constitution ...

The 1834 act, currently codified at 25 U.S.C. § 177, provides:

No purchase, grant, lease, or other conveyance of land, or of any title or claim thereto, from any Indian nation or tribe of Indians, shall be of any validity in law or equity, unless the same be made by treaty or convention entered into pursuant the constitution.

== Legislative history ==
One of the earliest interpretations of the Nonintercourse Act comes from a speech by President George Washington to the Seneca Nation of New York in 1790, after the passage of the act:

I am not uninformed that the six Nations have been led into some difficulties with respect to the sale of their lands since the peace. But I must inform you that these evils arose before the present government of the United States was established, when the separate States and individuals under their authority, undertook to treat with the Indian tribes respecting the sale of their lands. But the case is now entirely altered. The general Government only has the power, to treat with the Indian Nations, and any treaty formed and held without its authority will not be binding. Here then is the security for the remainder of your lands. No State nor person can purchase your lands, unless at some public treaty held under the authority of the United States. The general government will never consent to your being defrauded. But it will protect you in all your just rights.

== Land claims litigation ==
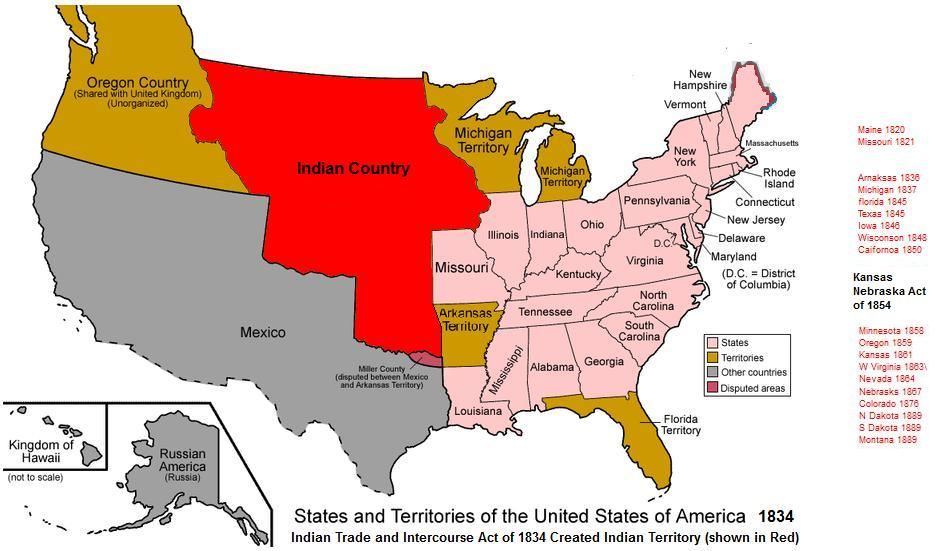
Indian Territory or Indian Country (red) as set by the Nonintercourse Act of 1834, which also dovetailed with other measures to relocate Indian populations westward.

=== History ===
The first litigation of the Nonintercourse Act by an indigenous party to reach the Supreme Court was Cherokee Nation v. Georgia (1831), which the Court dismissed on the technicality that the court lacked original jurisdiction, so the result was the Cherokee did not have a standing as a foreign nation, but the opinion did not rule on the merits, leaving the door open for a ruling on a resubmitted case. Former Attorney General William Wirt, the Cherokee's lawyer, argued that the challenged Georgia statute was void, inter alia, "because it is repugnant to a law of the United States passed in 1803 entitled 'an act to regulate trade and intercourse with Indian tribes, and to preserve peace on the frontiers'." Wirt also argued that the state statute violated the Cherokee treaties and the Contract Clause and the dormant Indian Commerce Clause of the United States Constitution. A similar argument was made in the Bill filed by Wirt in the Supreme Court. William Wirt's arguments may have had a telling effect, for in a subsequent action, Worcester v. Georgia (1832), the court reversed itself, holding that the Cherokee were a sovereign nation and thus the Supreme Court did have original jurisdiction.

After Cherokee Nation, the next such case to reach the Court was Seneca Nation of Indians v. Christy (1896). The New York Court of Appeals had dismissed the claim based on an interpretation of the Nonintercourse Act and an invocation of the statute of limitations for the state enabling act which enabled the Seneca to sue in state court; the Supreme Court dismissed the appeal because of the adequate and independent state grounds doctrine. The act remained essentially unlitigated by tribes until Federal Power Commission v. Tuscarora Indian Nation (1960), where the Tuscarora attempted to avoid the condemnation of their land by the construction of a federal dam. The court held the act inapplicable, but noted:

It is certain that if [25 U.S.C. § 177] is applicable ... the mere 'expressed consent' of Congress would be vain and idle. For § 177 at the very least contemplates the assent of the Indian nation or tribe. ... It follows that the mere consent of Congress, however express and specific, would avail nothing. Therefore, if § 177 is applicable ... the result would be that the Tuscarora lands, however imperative for the project, could not be taken at all.

This dicta inspired Oneida Indian Nation of N.Y. State v. Oneida Cnty. (1974) ("Oneida I"), where the Supreme Court held that there was federal subject-matter jurisdiction for Indian land claims based upon aboriginal title and violations of the Nonintercourse Act. In Oneida Cnty. v. Oneida Indian Nation of N.Y. State (1984) ("Oneida II"), the Supreme Court held that tribes have a federal common law cause of action, not pre-empted by the Nonintercourse Act, for possessory land claims based upon aboriginal title; the court also rejected the following affirmative defenses: limitations, abatement, ratification, and nonjusticiability.

While Oneida II remains the only final judgement entered by a court in favor of a tribe bringing a Nonintercourse Act land claim, Oneida I inspired dozens of other land claims. After tribes won initial judgements in some of these claims, Congress reacted by extinguishing the claimed aboriginal title and compensating the tribal plaintiffs. These Indian Land Claims Settlements are collected in 25 U.S.C. tit. 19. For example, in Joint Tribal Council of the Passamaquoddy Tribe v. Morton (1st Cir. 1975), after the First Circuit held that the federal government was obliged to bring a suit on the tribe's behalf claiming 60% of Maine, Congress approved an $81.5 million settlement. In the case of the Narragansett land claim (D.R.I. 1976), Congress enacted a settlement after the court struck all the defendant's affirmative defenses (laches, statute of limitations/adverse possession, estoppel by sale, operation of state law, and public policy) and denied the state's motion to dismiss on the grounds of sovereign immunity and nonjusticiability. Similarly, in Mohegan Tribe v. Connecticut (D. Conn. 1982), Congress approved the creation of the Mohegan Sun after the court struck the defendant's affirmative defenses. With the Mashantucket Pequot Tribe and Wampanoag, Congress enacted a settlement before the courts had a chance to enter any rulings.

=== Elements ===
As stated in Narragansett, there are four elements to a Nonintercourse Act claim.

In order to establish a prima facie case, plaintiff must show that:

1. it is or represents an Indian "tribe" within the meaning of the Act;
2. the parcels of land at issue herein are covered by the Act as tribal land;
3. the United States has never consented to the alienation of the tribal land;
4. the trust relationship between the United States and the tribe, which is established by coverage of the Act, has never been terminated or abandoned.

More recently (2008), the Second Circuit has stated:

In order to establish a violation of the Non-Intercourse Act, the [plaintiffs] are required to establish that: (1) they are an Indian tribe; (2) the land at issue was tribal land at the time of the conveyance; (3) the United States never approved the conveyance, and (4) the trust relationship between the United States and the tribe has not been terminated.

==== Tribal status ====
The Passamaquoddy and Narragansett cases, supra, are examples where the plaintiff has prevailed despite not being federally recognized tribes (the Passamaquoddy obtained federal recognition through the Maine Indian Claims Settlement; the Narragansett gained federal recognition in 1983, five years after the Rhode Island Claims Settlement Act). Although federal tribal status is prima facie evidence of the first element, the act also applies to unrecognized tribes.

If the tribe is unrecognized, the defendant may defeat the plaintiff's prima facie case either by showing that the Indians did not constitute a "tribe" at the time of the conveyance, or at the time of the litigation; thus, the defendant may show that the plaintiff is not the successor in interest to the tribe whose lands were illegally alienated. The leading case where the defendants prevailed on this element is Mashpee Tribe v. New Seabury Corp. (1st Cir. 1979). Alternatively, the action may be stayed until the Bureau of Indian Affairs makes a tribal status determination (and eventually dismissed if the BIA concludes the plaintiffs are not the successors in interest). The Pueblo were initially interpreted not to be "Indians" for the purposes of the Nonintercourse Act; however, this holding was subsequently overruled.

The elements given above are for a tribe. The United States, acting in its capacity as a trustee, may bring, and has successfully brought, actions on behalf of a tribe. The federal government was vested with similar power to enforce the anti-alienation provisions of the Allotment Acts. Conversely, individual Indians have no standing under the act. This is true even if individual plaintiffs attempt the certify a class of all tribal members; the tribe itself must sue.

==== Covered land ====
Unlike the Confederation Congress Proclamation of 1783, the Nonintercourse Act applies to land within the boundaries of a state, including the original thirteen. The First Circuit in Passamaquoddy and the Second Circuit in Mohegan Tribe, supra, held that the Nonintercourse Act applies to the entire United States, including the original thirteen. No defendant has yet persuaded a court otherwise.

However, the defendant will defeat this element if the challenged conveyance occurred before 1790. The Confederation Congress Proclamation of 1783 may cover conveyances between 1783 and 1790, but the only court to consider it held that the Confederation Congress had neither the power nor the intent to prohibit conveyances to states within their borders. The Royal Proclamation of 1763 may cover conveyances between 1763 and 1783; however, the only court to examine such a conveyance found that it satisfied the requirements of the Proclamation. For example, the conveyances at issue in Johnson v. McIntosh (1823) occurred on July 5, 1773 and October 18, 1775, but neither party to the suit was indigenous.

==== Federal non-consent ====
Through the policies of Indian removal in the East and Indian reservation-creation in the West, the federal government removed Native Americans from most of their ancestral land. However, examples of Congress approving a state action that alienated land are rare indeed. Congress would have to pass a statute with express language, or the Senate would have to ratify the treaty alienating the land, to secure such federal approval. The view taken by several of the Indian Land Claims Settlements is that Congress may consent to such conveyances retroactively; this view has not been tested in court, although it is likely to be upheld because the power of Congress to extinguish aboriginal title without compensation is plenary.

==== Trust relationship ====
In Passamaquoddy, supra, the First Circuit held that only Congress, and only with a clear statement, can terminate a federal–tribal trust relationship; acts of state governments are irrelevant. Congress has done so with several tribes under Indian termination policy. Since South Carolina v. Catawba Indian Tribe (1986) it has been understood that the Nonintercourse Act does not protect the lands of terminated tribes; there, the termination act was held to have triggered the state statute of limitations with respect to the land claim.

=== Affirmative defenses ===
Courts have considered and rejected several affirmative defenses to Nonintercourse Act suits. However, there are two affirmative defenses that have been accepted by some courts: state sovereign immunity and the equitable doctrine of laches.

==== State sovereign immunity ====
The structure of the original Constitution and the text of the Eleventh Amendment gives states sovereign immunity from most suits. There are exceptions: when the state consents to suit; when the federal government abrogates sovereign immunity by statute; when the federal government is the plaintiff or plaintiff-intervenor; and the category authorized by Ex parte Young (1908). In several cases, Nonintercourse Act plaintiffs have satisfied one of these exceptions. However, the Nonintercourse Act itself does not abrogate state sovereign immunity. Moreover, the authority is clear that the Ex parte Young exception does not apply. Therefore, plaintiffs must obtain the intervention of the federal government or relegate themselves to suing local governments and private land owners.

Further, in actions against states, Indians are not entitled to the presumption of 25 U.S.C. § 194, which applies only to "persons".

==== Laches ====
Four dissenting justices would have barred the tribes action based on laches in Oneida County v. Oneida Indian Nation of N.Y. State (1985), a question the majority did not reach. The Second Circuit adopted the view of the dissent in Cayuga Indian Nation of N.Y. v. Pataki (2d Cir. 2005), and since then no tribal plaintiff has been able to overcome this affirmative defense in that circuit. Cayuga erased a damage award of $247.9 million, the largest ever awarded under the act.

== Other provisions ==
=== Definition of Indian country ===
In addition to regulating relations between Indians living on Indian land and non-Indians, the 1834 Act identified an area known as "Indian country". This land was described as being "all that part of the United States west of the Mississippi and not within the states of Missouri and Louisiana, or the territory of Arkansas". This is the land that became known as Indian Territory.

=== Trading posts ===
One of the most defining aspects of the acts was the establishment of a series of "factories" which were officially licensed trading posts where Native Americans were to sell their merchandise (particularly furs). The factories, which officially were set up to protect the tribes from unscrupulous private traders, were to be used as leverage to cause the tribes to cede substantial territory in exchange for access to the "factory" as happened with the Treaty of Fort Clark in which the Osage Nation exchanged most of Missouri in order to access Fort Clark.

=== Property claims ===
According to U.S. Attorney General William Wirt:

[T]he United States agree to pay [the Creek Indians] certain specific sums of money, out of which payments there is a reservation of $5,000 to satisfy claims for property taken by individuals of the said nation from the citizens of the United States subsequent to the treaty of Colerain, which has been or may be claimed and established agreeably to the provisions of the act for regulating trade and intercourse with the Indian tribes, and to preserve peace on the frontiers.

== State nonintercourse acts ==
The Nonintercourse Act did not pre-empt the states from legislating additional restraints on alienation of Native American lands. Many states, including nearly all of the original Thirteen, enacted similar statutes for at least some lands during at least some time periods.

Other state statutes, or constitutional provisions, incorporated the English common law as it had evolved up to that point.

=== New York ===
A New York State enacted March 31, 1821, provided:

[I]t shall be unlawful for any person or persons, other than Indians, to settle or reside upon any lands belonging to or occupied by any nation or tribe of Indians within this state; and that all leases, contracts and agreements made by any Indians, whereby any person or persons, other than Indians, shall be permitted to reside upon such lands, shall be absolutely void; and if any person or persons shall settle or reside on any such lands, contrary to this act, it shall be the duty of any judge of any court of Common Pleas of the county within which such lands shall be situated, on complaint made to him, and on due proof of the fact of such settlement or residence, to issue his warrant, under his hand and seal, directed to the sheriff of such county, commanding him, within ten days after the receipt thereof, to remove such person or persons so settling or residing, with his, her or their families, from such lands.

=== South Carolina ===
A 1739 South Carolina Provincial Council statute required a license from the Crown or governor for a private party to purchase lands from Indians.

== See also ==
- Treaty of New York (1790)
