= California Indian Reservations and Cessions =

History of the removal of California's Indigenous peoples

Between 1851 and 1852, the United States Army forced California's tribes to sign 18 treaties that relinquished each tribe's rights to their traditional lands in exchange for reservations. Due to pressure from California representatives, the Senate repudiated the treaties and ordered them to remain secret. In 1896 the Bureau of American Ethnology report on major native American Indian interactions with the United States Government was the first time the treaties were made public. The report, Indian Land Cessions in the United States (book), compiled by Charles C. Royce, includes the 18 lost treaties between the state's tribes and a map of the reservations. Below is the California segment of the report listing the treaties. The full report covered all 48 states' tribal interactions nationwide with the U.S. government.

According to historian Robert Lee and the other authors of the report "Land-Grab Universities, a High Country News Investigation" (2020), lands subject to the unratified treaties were taken by the United States government and sold to fund the land-grant universities established by the Morill Land-Grant Act of 1862.

== California Indian Reservations and Cessions ==
The following database is an extraction of all the United States' formal actions between 1851 and 1892 with California Indians documented by the Bureau of American Ethnology in its Eighteenth annual report to the Smithsonian Institution in 1896.

== History ==
Upon becoming a state in 1850, California was required by law to allow the United States government to conduct all formal relationships with tribal communities. Because California's previous Mexican government had no formal relationships with the Indians following the 1833 Secularization Act that closed the Spanish era's Catholic Missions, most of the 150,000 surviving tribal people either became servants for the Ranchos of California owners or migrated east to the Sierra Mountains or to the north where they mixed with other non-Mission tribes that had been left alone by Mexico.

California's farmers and gold miners demanded that Indians and other "aliens" be heavily taxed or removed from the gold fields. In 1851, at the same time that the United States was setting up the Public Land Commission as required by the 1848 Treaty of Guadalupe Hidalgo with the Republic of Mexico to verify the legality of the Ranchos of California Land Grants given California citizens prior to 1846, the government also set up a commission with military support that resulted in 134 of the state's 300-plus Indian tribes signing 18 treaties that gave away their sovereign rights in exchange for 7.4 million acres of "reservation" lands spread across the state.

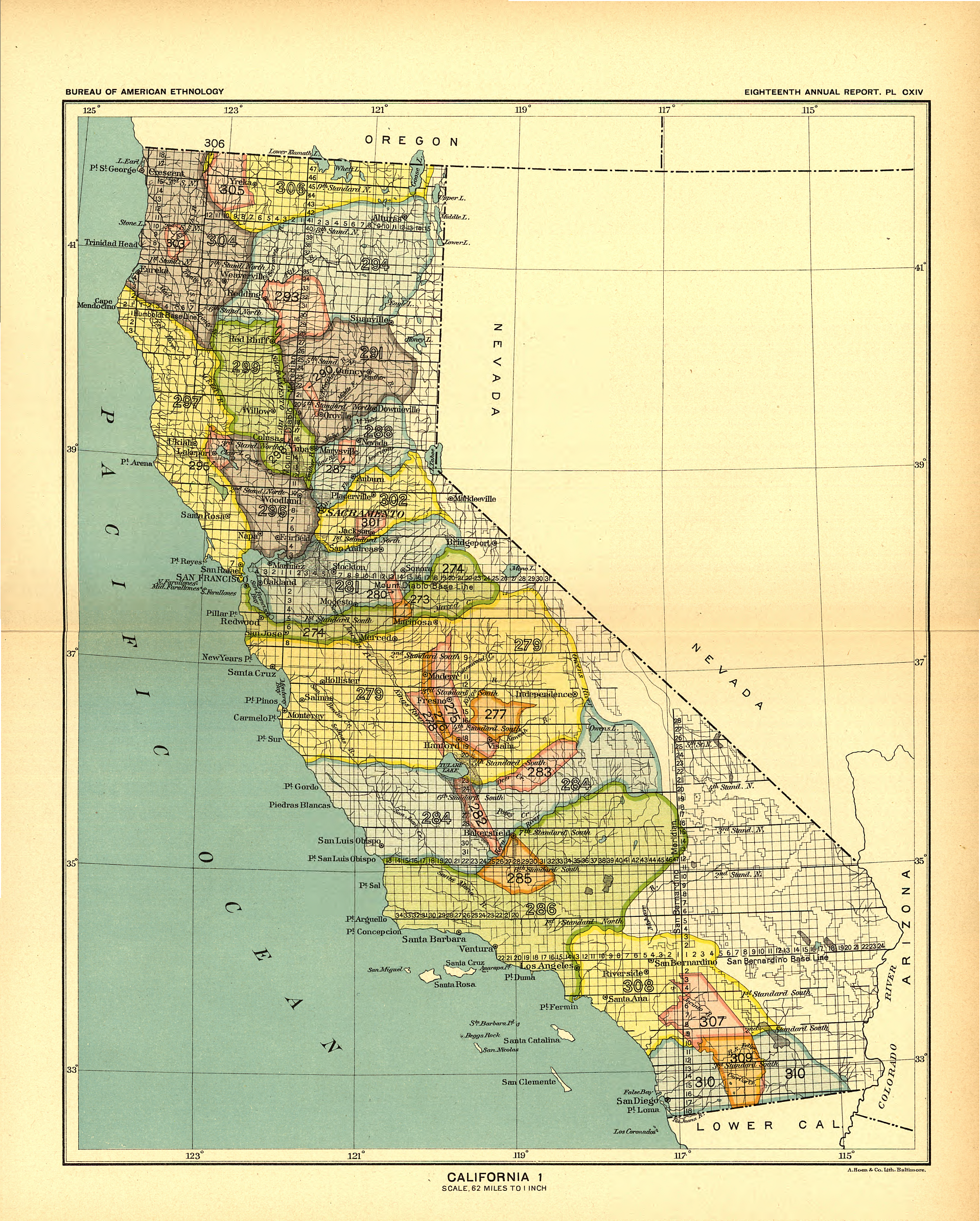
1896 California Map 1 of Indian Cessions and Reservations

Between 1851 and 1865, California carried out the wishes of its citizens: the removal of tribal communities from their ancestral lands by military force across California. The United States went along with these actions, rather than using its resources to stop the state from this period of California Genocide that was legitimized by the 1850 Indian Protection Act and numerous bond and financing actions that went to finance dozens of state militias that hunted down and killed tribal members.

During the first years between 1851 and 1852, John Frémont, a U.S. Senator for the state of California, organized the Mariposa Battalion to round up tribal representatives who were living on his Mariposa Rancho. Frémont pushed for federal troops and three Indian Commissioners who obtained treaty agreements from tribal representatives to abandon their lands in exchange for what would be the first round of reservations for land actions in California. The state, however, refused to even allow these massive land takeaways, resulting in the treaties' initial failure, and by a Senate order their very existence was hidden from the public for over 45 years.

One of the three appointed commissioners, Oliver M. Wozencraft, reported that the government's action would lead to a "war of extermination" against the state's tribal people on May 31, 1852, even going public by publishing a pamphlet laying out the impacts, but for speaking out he was relieved of his duties by September of the same year.

The U.S. Bureau of Indian Affairs, which was originally part of the U.S. War Department, eventually set up four reservations as prescribed by Congress, followed later by additional tracts of lands ceded to various Mission Indians located mostly in Southern California. In 1896, the Smithsonian Institution produced a report documenting all historic actions by date and tribe of lands taken from or reservations created by the U.S.

Larisa Miller documented how the Northern California Indian Association (NCIA) petitioned President Roosevelt in 1903 to buy federal lands for thousands of homeless Indians across the state because "title and ownership to this beautiful land have never been extinguished." Their campaign led to the rediscovery of the 18 Treaties that were signed by 134 bands of Californians and the removal of the senate's order of secrecy on January 18, 1905.

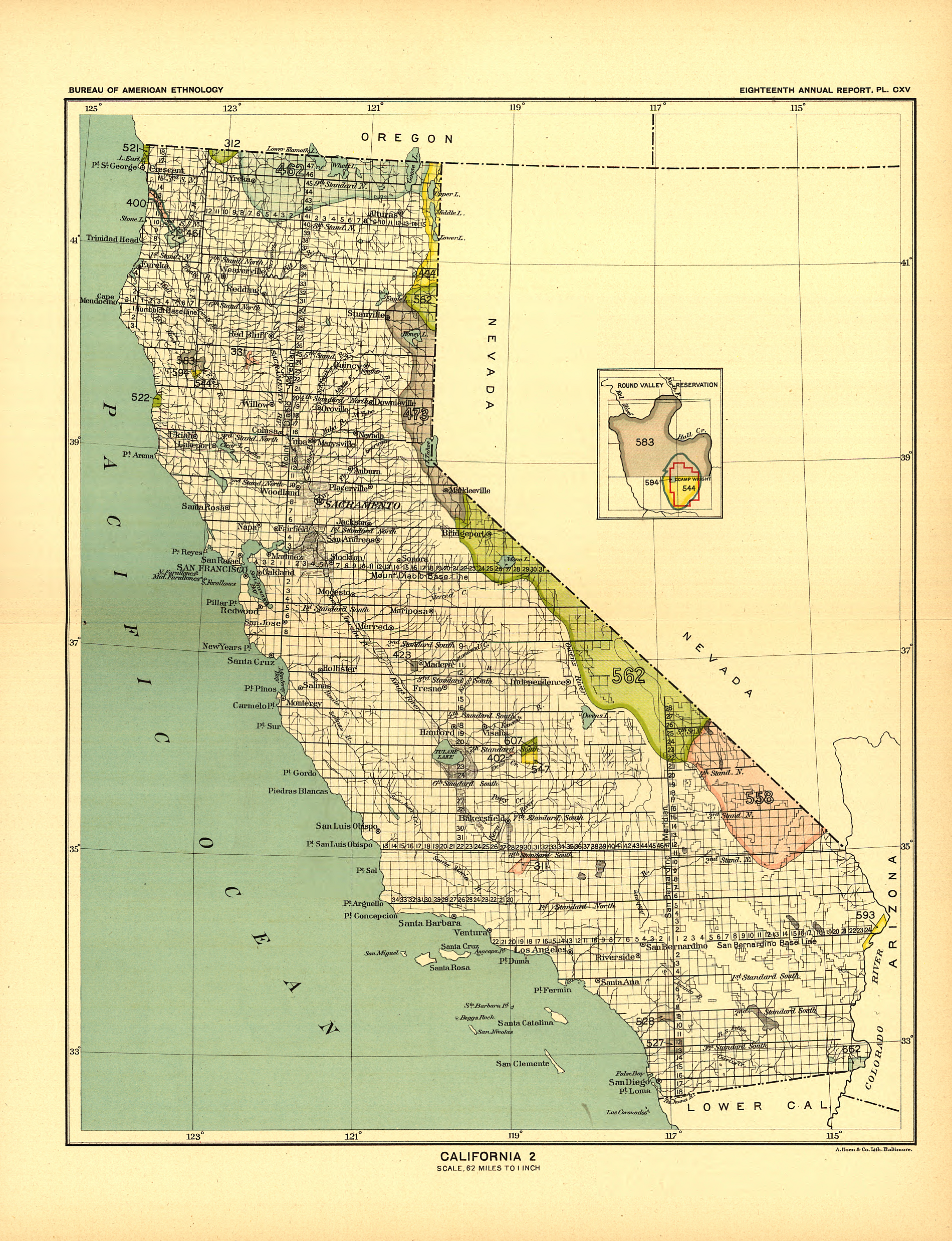
1896 California Map 2 of Indian Cessions and Reservations

The United States Bureau of American Ethnology produced annual reports to the Smithsonian Institution on various Native American subjects. In their 18th annual, two-volume report, they published a complete list of all U.S. takings (cessions), treaties and reservations prior to 1896. The report was compiled By Charles C. Royce, with a 122-page introduction by Cyrus Thomas documenting legal claims for the actions the United States had based its actions on, with a focus on U.S. Supreme Court's 1823 Discovery doctrine decision.

It was Thomas' following statement that set the tone for the introduction:

"Its extent afforded an ample field for the ambition and enterprise of all, and the character, low culture-status, and religious beliefs of the aborigines afforded an apology for considering them a people over whom the superior genius of Europe might rightfully claim an ascendancy. The sovereigns of the Old World therefore found no difficulty in convincing themselves that they made ample compensation to the natives by bestowing on them the benefits of civilization and Christianity in exchange for control over them and their country."

The report included color maps for each state, two for California, with numbered areas (also in color) to identify each cession or reservation. These can be used to locate the land.

== Indian Land Cessions in the United States ==
The spreadsheet section in part 2, pages 781 – 948 is titled "Indian Land Cessions in the United States." The data are extracted from the U.S. government's treaties, reservations and land cessions with California's tribal people in the years 1851–1896. The California instances in the spreadsheet include page references to legal citation and historic materials. All links embedded in the spreadsheet, including the names identifying particular "Mission Indian" Tribes, have been added to make the original report clearer. Some sections on individual tracts in the Public Land Survey System were omitted from the original.

Note that the below database identifies the land involved in each transaction with a number that can be located on the above maps. Later transactions are located on the 2nd map or "Ca-2", plus the appropriate number. The first 18 entries, described below as unratified treaties, were not listed as such in the 1896 Smithsonian report, but as stated lands ceded in exchange for tracts of land.

Tribe	Date	Map #	Page	Reference	Authority	Cession or Reservation	Historic data and remarks
Treaty M Tribes (Note: Si-yan-te, Po-to-yan-ti, Co-co-noon, A-pang-asse, Aplache, A-wall-a-che)	3–19–1851	273 274	780	Unratified Treaty	Ca. Militia: Mariposa Brigade U.S. Indian commissioners: Col. Redick McKee, Col. George W. Barbour, and Dr. Oliver W. Wozencraft	Reserve a tract between Mercede and Tuolumne river	Negotiations held at Camp Fremont Full text of treaty
Treaty N Tribes (Note: How-ech-ee, Chook-cha-nee, Chow-chil-lie, Po-ho-nee-chee, Nook-choo, Pit-cat-chee, Cas-son, Toom-na, Tall-in-chee, Pas-ke-sa, Wa-cha-et, I-tach-ee, Cho-e-nem-nee, Cho-ki-men-a, We-mal-che, No-to-no-to)	4–29–1851	275	782	Unratified Treaty	California Mariposa Brigade U.S. Indian commissioners: Col. Redick McKee, Col. George W. Barbour, and Dr. Oliver W. Wozencraft	Reserve a tract between Chowchilla and Cah-wia rivers Cede all territory not reserved by said treaties.	Negotiations at Camp Barbour
Treaty A Tribes (Note: Ta-che, Cah-wia, Yo-kol, To-lum-ne, Wic-chum-ne, Hol-cu-ma, To-e-ne-che, Tu-huc-mach, In-tim-peach, Choi-nuck, We-mil-che, No-to-no-to)	5–13–1851	276	782	Unratified Treaty	California Mariposa Brigade U.S. Indian commissioner Col. George W. Barbour	Reserve a tract between Cah-wia and Chowchilla rivers Cede all territory not reserved by said treaties.	Negotiations at Camp Belt
Treaty B Tribes (Note: Yo-lum-ne, Co-ye-tie)	5–13–1851	276	782	Unratified Treaty	California Mariposa Brigade U.S. Indian commissioner Col. George W. Barbour	Reserve a tract for between Tule river, Paint creek, Emigrant road, and Sierra Nevadas.	Negotiations at Camp Keyes
Treaty E Tribes (Note: I-o-no-hum-ne, We-chil-la, Su-ca-ah, Co-to-plan-e-nee, Chap-pah-sim, and Sage-wom-nee)	5–28–1851	280 281	782	Unratified Treaty	California Mariposa Brigade U.S. Indian commissioners Dr. Oliver W. Wozencraft	Reserve a tract on Stanislaus river Cede all territory not reserved by said treaties.	Negotiations at Dent and Vantine Crossing
Treaty B Tribes (Note: Ko-ya-te, Wo-la-si, New-chow-we, Wack-sa-che, Pal-wis-ha, Po-ken-well, Ya-wil-chine)	5–30–1851	277 278 279	782	Unratified Treaty	California Mariposa Brigade U.S. Indian commissioners: Col. Redrick Mckee, Col. George W. Barbour, and Dr. Oliver W. Wozencraft	1. Reserve a tract between Cah-wia and King's rivers; 2. Reserve a tract on King's river; Cede all territory not reserved by said treaties.	Negotiations and Camp Keyes
Treaty C Tribes (Note: Chu-nute, Wo-wol, Yo-lum-ne, Co-ye-tie)	6–3–1851	282 283 284	782	Unratified Treaty	California Mariposa Brigade U.S. Indian commissioner Col. George W. Barbour	1. Reserve a tract for Chu-nute and Wo-wol tribes between Tulare and Buena Vista lakes; 2. Reserve a tract for Yo-luiu-ne and Co-ye-tie tribes between Tule river. Paint creek, Emigrant road, and Sierra Nevadas.; Cede all claims to territory outside of reserved tracts	Negotiations at Camp Burton
Treaty D Tribes (Note: Cas-take, Tejon, San Imiri, Uva, Cari-se, Buena Vista, Se-rahu-ow, Holo-cla-me, Soho-nut, Toci-a, Hol-mi-uk)	6–10–1851	285 286	782	Unratified Treaty	California Mariposa Brigade U.S. Indian commissioners Col. George W. Barbour, and Persifer F. Smith	Reserve a tract between Tejon pass and Kern river Cede all claim to territory outside of reserved tract	Negotiations at Camp Persifer F. Smith
Treaty F Tribes (Note: Das-pia, Ya-ma-do, Yol-la-mer, Wai-de-pa-can, On-o-po-ma, Mon-e-da, Wan-nuck, Nem-shaw, Be-no-pi, Ya-cum-na)	7–18–1851	287 288	784	Unratified Treaty	California Mariposa Brigade U.S. Indian commissioner Dr. Oliver W. Wozencraft	Reserve a tract between Bear and Yuba rivers Cede all claim to other territory	Negotiations at Camp Union
Treaty G Tribes (Note: Mi-chop-da, Es-ki-un, Ho-lo-lu-pi, Toto, Su-nu, Che-no, Bat-si, Yut-duc, Sim-sa-wa)	8–1–1851	290 291	784	Unratified Treaty	California Mariposa Brigade U.S. Indian commissionerDr. Oliver W. Wozencraft	Reserve a tract on Feather river Cede all claim to other territory	Negotiations at Bidwell Ranch
Treaty H Tribes (Note: Noe-ma-noe-ma, Y-lac-ca, and Noi-me-noi-me)	8–16–1851	293 294	784	Unratified Treaty	California Mariposa Brigade U.S. Indian commissioner Dr. Oliver W. Wozencraft	Reserve a tract on Sacramento river Cede all claim to other territory	Negotiations ad Reading Ranch
Treaty O Tribes (Note: Ca-la-na-po, Ha-bi-na-po, Da-no-ha-bo, Mo-al-kai, Checom, How-ku-ma, Cha-nel-kai, Me-dam-a-rec)	8–20–1851	295 296	784	Unratified Treaty	California Mariposa Brigade U.S. Indian commissioner Col. Redrick Mckee,	Reserve a tract on Clear lake Cede all claim to other territory	Negotiations at Camp Lu-pi-yu-ma
Treaty P Tribes (Note: Sai-nell, Yu-ki-as, Mas-su-ta-ka-ya, Po-mo)	8–22–1851	297	784	Unratified Treaty	California Mariposa Brigade U.S. Indian commissioner Col. Redrick Mckee	Cede all claim to territory and agree to remove to Clear lake reserve	Negotiations at Camp Fernando Feliz
Treaty I Tribes (Note: co-lu, Wil-lay, Co-ha-ma, Tat-nah, Cha, Doc-duc, Cham-et-ko, Toc-de)	9–9–1851	298 299	786	Unratified Treaty	California Mariposa Brigade U.S. Indian commissioner Dr. Oliver W. Wozencraft	Reserve a tract on Sacramento river Cede all claim to territory	Negotiations and Camp Colus
Treaty J Tribes (Note: Cu-lee, Yas-see, Lo-clum-ne, Wo-pum-ne)	9–18–1851	301 302	786	Unratified Treaty	California Mariposa Brigade U.S. Indian commissioner Dr. Oliver W. Wozencraft	Reserve a tract on Consumnes river Cede all claim to territory	Negotiations at Fork of Cosumnes River
Treaty Q Tribes (Note: Poh-lik(Lower Klamath), Pehtuck(Upper Klamath), Hoo-pah(Trinity river))	10–6–1851	303 304	788	Unratified Treaty	California Mariposa Brigade U.S. Indian commissioner Col. Redrick Mckee	Reserve a tract on Klamath river Cede all claim to territory	Negotiations at Camp Klamath
Treaty R Tribes (Note: O-de-i-lah, I-ka-ruck, Ko-se-tah, I-da-kar-i-waka-ha, Wat-sa-he-wa, E-eh)	11–4–1851	305 306	788	Unratified Treaty	California Mariposa Brigade U.S. Indian commissioner Col. Redrick Mckee	Reserve a tract on the upper Klamath river Cede all claim to territory	Negotiations Scotts Valley camp. The first of these tribes was commonly called Upper Klamath; the next three, Shasta Valley Indians; and the last two, Scotts Valley Indians.
Treaty K Tribes (Note: San Luis Rey, Kah-we-a, Co-com-cah-ra)	1–5–1852	307 308	788	Unratified Treaty	California Mariposa Brigade U.S. Indian commissioner Dr. Oliver W. Wozencraft	Reserve a tract in SW. California Cede all claim to territory	Negotiations at Village of Temecula
Treaty L Tribes (Note: Dieguenos)	1–7–1852	309 310	788	Unratified Treaty	California Mariposa Brigade U.S. Indian commissioner Dr. Oliver W. Wozencraft	Reserve a tract on S. line of California Cede all claim to territory	Negotiations at Village of Santa Isabel
Tejon, Castake, San Imirio, et al.	9–1853	Ca-2 311	788		Superintendent of Indian Affairs EF Beale	E.F. Beale establishes a reserve, called Tejon Pass Reservation	Reservation location and History (Note: This reserve was surveyed, shortly after its location, by H. D. Washburn, and contained about 75,000 acres. Nov. 25, 1856, the Secretary of the Interior ordered its reduction to 25,000 acres, to bring it within the limits prescribed by act of Mar. 3, 1855. The boundaries of the reduced reserve were never surveyed. Subsequently, ex-superintendent Beale and others obtained patents under old Spanish grants for most of the land covered by the original reserve. Measures were therefore taken to remove the Indians and to abandon the reserve. The last of the Indians were removed to Tule River reserve, as reported by Superintendent Wiley, July 11, 1864. The tract shown on the map exhibits the boundaries of the reserve as originally surveyed.)
Rogue River Indians Table Rock Oregon Territory	9–10–1853	Ca-2 312	788	Stat. L., X, 1018		Cede tract along N. Cal border and Oregon: Applegate creek, Rogue river, Althouse creek, along Siskiyou mountains; Cascade range to Pitt's peak. Indians to retain temporary occupancy of a portion of the ceded country until a reserve is assigned them.	The boundaries of the country reserved under this clause are shown by dotted red lines. It was known as Table Rock reserve, and was abandoned and the Indians removed in 1855. See Rogue River Wars
Nome Lackee, Nome Cult, Nir-muck, et al.	9–1–1854	Ca-2 331	794			Reservation size and history (Note: Superintendent Henley establishes a reserve called Nome Lackee | This reserve was surveyed by Nicholas Gray in Sept., 1857, and contained 25,139.71 acres. It was practically abandoned by Superintendent Hanson in July, 1861. He recommended its sale. July 7, 1870, the Commissioner of Indian Affairs officially notified the General Land Office that it was no longer needed for Indian purposes.)	
Klamath	11–16–1855	Ca-2 400	794	Executive Order		President sets apart a reserve of 25,000 acres on both sides of Klamath river in California, the same being a strip commencing at the Pacific Ocean and extending 1 mile in width on each side of the Klamath river for a distance of 20 miles.	Reservation size and history (Note: This was selected by Superintendent Henley as one of the two additional reserves authorized by act of Congress Mar. 3, 1855. It was surveyed by Deputy Surveyor Lewis in 1857. Dec. 31, 1861, the Indian agent reported the complete destruction of both the reservation and the public property thereon by a freshet, which left the soil covered to the depth of several feet with sand. The Indians were at once removed to Smith River reservation. Though not formally relinquished, the Klamath was not thereafter occupied as an Indian reservation until 1877, when the Commissioner of Indian. Affairs asked that the War Department remove white trespassers. Recent action has been taken looking to the allotment of land in severally to those Indians residing on the reserve with a view to restoring the surplus land to the public domain.)
Camel-el-po-ma Pomo et al.	5–22–1856	Ca-2 522	816	Executive Order		President set apart Mendocino reserve in California in compliance with recommendation of Superintendent Henley of Nov. 17, 1855.	This reserve was abandoned for Indian purposes on Mar. 31, 1866, and was restored to the public domain by act of Congress of July 27, 1868
Tule River or Madden Farm reservation Indians	1856	Ca-2 402	814			This tract was informally established in 1856 as an Indian reservation.	Tule Reservation size and history (Note: In 1857–58 Mr Thomas P. Madden, an employee of the Indian service, entered and obtained title to the land with state-school warrants. It was thereafter known as the Madden farm, containing 1,280 acres, and the U. S. paid him rental therefor until it was abandoned in 1876, and the Indians removed to the new Tule River reservation, established, by Executive orders of Jan. 9 and Oct. 3, 1873. In addition to the Madden farm the U. S. occupied and fenced 160 acres adjoining, but that was also entered by an Indian employee as a homestead in 1864.)
Round Valley reservation Indians	9–4–1856	Ca-2 (detail of Round Valley reservation)	816			Superintendent Henley reports selection of temporary reservation at Round valley or "Nome Cult."	Round Valley Reservation size and history (Note: It was first established as an Indian farm for temporary use, but has been ever since continued as an Indian reserve. Nov. 18, 1858, Superintendent Henley was instructed to make public proclamation that the whole of Round valley was reserved. In Mar. 1860, it was surveyed by Andrew J. Hatch. The boundaries thus surveyed are here shown by red lines and contained 25,030.08 acres, having been reduced to the limit authorized by the act of Mar. 3, 1853. A subsequent enlargement and survey was made in 1870, the boundaries of which are shown by blue lines (see Executive order of Mar. 30, 1870). Still later modifications of boundary have been made, for which see act of Congress of Mar. 3, 1873, and Executive order of July 26, 1876.)
Yokuts Chow-chilla(Chaushila) & Mono people, Miwok (Note: Phoho-neche tribes today are: California Valley Miwok Tribe, Tuolumne Band, Buena Vista Rancheria, Chicken Ranch Rancheria, Ione Band, Jackson Rancheria, Shingle Springs Band & Middletown Rancheria of Pomo Indians)(Poho-neche), Chook-chancie, et al.	11–19–1859	Ca-2 423	822			Superintendent McDuffie reports abandonment of Fresno River reservation.	Reservation size and history (Note: Special Agent J. Ross Browne reported, Nov. 4, 1859, that this reserve, so far as the agricultural portion of it was concerned, consisted of a farm which had been rented of private parties since 1854. It was originally established as a temporary Indian reserve and no official survey was, so far as known, made of its boundaries although by report of Superintendent Henley, Aug. 15, 1857 it was stated that he had selected it as the last of the five permanent reserves authorized by act of Mar. 3, 1853. Its location is laid down (but by what authority is not known) on a map of California in the Indian Office files bearing number 186. The location thus indicated is accepted for want of a more definite one.)
Shoshone, (Western bands)	10–1–1863	Ca-2 444	828	Executive Action	Stat. L., xviii,689	Possession status (Note: President authorized to establish reservations for them when deemed advisable. Location primarily in Nevada, but includes California. No formal purchase of the territorial claim of these tribes or bands was made, but the U. S. took possession of the same, assuming the right of satisfying their claim by assigning them such reservations as might seem essential lor their occupancy, and supplying them in such degree as might seem proper with necessaries of life.)	Reservation size and history (Note: For a separate definition of the boundaries of the Shoshoni-Goship, see treaty with that band of Oct. 12, 1863. For reservations established under this authority see Lemhi reserve, by Executive order of Feb. 12, 1875; Carlin Farms reserve, by Executive order of May 10, 1877, and Duck Valley reserve, by Executive order of Apr. 16, 1877. A reservation had also been established in 1859 at Euby valley, but after a few years of occupancy it was abandoned.)
California Indians	4–8–1864		830	Act Of Congress	Stat. L., XIII, 39.	Authorizing the establishment of four Indian reservations within the limits of the state.	Statute limited the number of reservations in California to a total of 4. Recognized under this act were Round Valley, Hoopa Valley, Smith River, and Tule River
Hupa (S. Fork, Redwood, and Grouse Creek bands)	8–21–1864	Ca-2 461	832	Stat. L., XIII, 39.	Under act of Congress April 8, 1864.	Superintendent Wiley locates the whole of Hoopa valley as one of the reserves contemplated by act of Apr. 8, 1864	Reservation size and history (Note: Oct. 3, 1864, the Commissioner of Indian Affairs, in approving the action of Superintendent Wiley, directed that particular care be taken in the definition of the boundaries of the reserve. Mar. 3, 1865, Congress appropriated $60,000 to pay for improvements of white settlers on the reserve. In 1875 the boundaries were surveyed by C. T. Bissell, and by Executive order of June 23, 1876, these boundaries were adopted and declared to be the true boundaries of the Hoopa Valley reserve.)
Washoe	7–10–1865	Ca-2 473	836	Order of Sectary of Interior.		Country claimed by Washoes was taken possession of by settlers between 1855 and 1865 without purchase of their title by U. S.	Reservation size and history (Note: July 1, 1865, Agent Lockhart recommended the establishment of two reserves of 360 acres each for the Washo in Carson and Washoe valleys. July 10, 1865, the Secretary of the Interior directed that two reserves, containing in the aggregate 8 sections, be set apart for them. Oct. 23, 1865, Agent Parker reported that no suitable lands for such reserves remained vacant, and recommended that no further action lie taken. The original country of the Washo is here shown.)
Smith River Reservation Closed	7–27–1868	Ca-2 521	850	Act of Congress	Stat. L.xv.221.	Removal of Indians to Hoopa Valley and Round Valley reservations	Reservation history (Note: Klamath River Reserve destroyed with Indians moved to Smith River in 1862. In May 1862, Sec. of Interior and Indian Commissioner set aside additional lands at Smith River, but Congress fails to make appropriations to purchase it. Smith River abandoned in 1869.)
Mendocino Indian Reservation	7–27–1868	Ca-2 522	850	Act of Congress	Stat. L.xv.223.	Reservation status (Note: Congress restores Mendocino Indian reservation to public domain. This tract lay on both sides of Klamath river from its mouth 20 miles up the same; between the S. bank of Noyo river (so as to include that river) and a point 1 mile N. of Hale, or Bee-da-loe creek; extending eastward from the coast for quantity so as to include the valleys beyond the first range of hills to the Coast mountains, conforming to their shape. | The act of Congress of Mar. 3, 1853, authorized the selection of five military reserves for Indian purposes in California not to exceed 25,000 acres each.) Mendocino Reservation size and history (Note: Nov. 17. 1855, Superintendent Henley transmitted a report of Major Heintzelman with a map showing the tract selected for the Mendocino reservation and recommending its establishment. Aug. 16, 1856, the Commissioner of Indian Affairs recommended issuance of Executive order setting apart this reserve. May 22, 1856, President Pierce issued the desired Executive order. Its actual abandonment for Indian purposes occurred Mar. 31, 1866.)	
San Pasqual, Pala Valley Mission Indians	1–31–1870	Ca-2 527 528	852	Executive Action		President sets apart a reserve for Indians near San Bernardino	Trouble arose with the settlers and the reserve was abandoned in Apr., 1871.
Round River Valley Reservation expanded	3–30–1870	Ca-2 Round River inset	852	Executive Action		President enlarges Round Valley reservation in California	Nome Cult Reservation size and history (Note: Round valley, or "Nome Cult," as it was then called, was selected for Indian purposes by Superintendent Henley in 1856. Nov. 18, 18.58, the Secretary of the Interior ordered public notice to be given that the entire valley had been set apart for an Indian reservation and directed its survey May 3, 1860. See act of Congress of Mar. 3, 1873. and Executive orders of Mar. 30, 1870, Apr. 8, 1873, May 18, 1873, and Jan. 26, 1876. The boundaries of the reserve as enlarged by this Executive order (Mar. 30, 1870) are shown by blue lines.)
Tule river, King's river, Owen's river, et al.	1–9–1873	Ca-2 607	860	Executive Order		President sets apart a reserve at Tule river	Canceled and a new reserve established Oct. 3, 1873
Round River Valley Reservation	4–8–1873	Ca-2 583	862	Executive Order		President withdraws from sale certain lands in Round valley, specified by act of Mar. 3, 1873, until report of commissioners is received fixing N. boundary.	The commissioners made their report Nov. 1, 1873. It was approved by the Secretary of the Interior Aug. 4. 1874. and proclamation of the boundaries made by Executive order of May 18, 1875.
Tule river, King's river, Owen's river, et al.	10–3–1873	547 607	864	Executive Order		Tule Reservation Expansion and location (Note: President cancels reserve made by Executive order Jan. 9, 1873, and establishes another at Tule river in lieu thereof, bounded as follows: Commencing on the S. fork of Tale river. 4 miles below the Soda springs on said river; thence N. to the ridge of mountains dividing the waters of the N. fork and Middle fork of Tule river; thence on said ridge easterly, extended, if necessary, to a point from which a line running due S.)	Reservation location and history (Note: Partly restored to public domain by Executive order of Aug. 3, 1878, as shown under that order. The remainder constitutes the present Tule River reserve, and is shown here. (This includes Nos. 547 and 607. The portions added to the former reserve are the N. part of 607 and the yellow No. 547.))
Paiute	3–23–1874	Ca-2 562	872	Executive Order		President establishes reservation at Pyramid Lake, as surveyed by Eugene Monroe on January 23, 1865, Plat taken from original in Office of Indian Affairs	Reservation location and history (Note: The establishment of this reserve was recommended by Agent Dodge Nov. 25, 1859. Nov. 29, 1859, the .Secretary of the Interior directed that the reserve be so established. Feb. 15, 1861, Agent Lockhart was instructed to have the boundaries surveyed. They were surveyed by Eugene Monroe in Jan., 1865. Subsequent investigation showed Monroe's survey of E. boundary to be incorrect. The incorrect portion of Monroe's survey is indicated by a dotted black line. Remainder of Pai Ute country taken possession of by U.S. without formal relinquishment by the Indians.)
Round Valley Reservation	5–18–1875	Ca-2 583	880	Executive Order		President proclaims the boundaries of Round Valley reservation in accordance with act of Congress Mar. 3, 1873	Reservation boundaries and history (Note: These constitute the present boundaries of the reserve except that the military reserve of 1 square mile at Camp Wright was added to the Indian reservation by Executive order of July 26, 1876. (See Executive orders of Apr. 8, 1873, and Mar.30, 1870.))
Mission Indians – Portrero – Rincon, Gapich, La Joya, Cahuila, Capitan Grande, Santa Ysabel – Mesa Grande, Pala, Agua Caliente, Sycuan, Inaja, Cosmit	12–27–1875		884	Executive Order		President sets apart reservations for Mission Indians, in San Diego county, California	See Executive orders of May 3, 1877, Aug. 25, 1877, and Sept. 29, 1877; also that of Jan. 17, 1880.
Colorado River	5–15–1876	Ca-2 593	886	Executive Order		President alludes to previous errors and correctly defines boundaries of Colorado River reservation – partially in California.	See act of Congress of Mar. 3, 1865, and executive order of Nov. 22, 1873 and Nov. 16, 1874
Mission Indians – Portrero, Agua Caliente, Torros, Cabezons	5–15–1876		886	Executive Order		President sets apart additional tracts for Mission Indians	See Executive orders of Dec. 27, 1875, May 3, 1877, August 25, 1877, and September 29, 1877
Hupa et al.	6–23–1876	Ca-2 461	886	Executive Order		President proclaims the boundaries of Hoopa Valley reservation as one of the reserves authority by act of Apr. 8, 1864.	This reserve was established Aug. 21, 1864 by Superintendent Wiley
Round Valley Indians	7–26–1876	Ca-2 594 sec.2, T.22N., R.13W.	886	Executive Order		President adds late Camp Wright military reservation to Round Valley Indian reservation	See Executive order of Mar. 30, 1870, Apr. 8, 1873, and May 18, 1873
Mission Indians Cahuilla Band of Mission Indians of the Cahuilla Reservation	5–3–1877		890	Executive Order		President restores to public domain a portion of lands withdrawn by Executive orders of Dec. 27, 1875, and May 15, 1876, T.7S, R.2E, T.14S., R.2E & T.9S., R.2W.	See Executive orders of August 25, 1877, and September 29, 1877
Mission Indians – Morongo Band	8–25–1877	Ca-2 825	890	Executive Order		President withdraws and sets apart further tracts for reservation T.2S., R.1E	See Executive orders of Dec. 27, 1875, May 15, 1876, May 3, 1877, and Sept. 29, 1877
Mission Indians Agua Caliente Band of Cahuilla Indians	9–29–1877		892	Executive Order		President withdraws and sets apart further tracts for reservation: Palm Springs – T.4S., R.4E.	See Executive orders of Dec. 27, 1875, May 15, 1876, May 3, 1877, and Sept. 29, 1877
Tule River, King's River, et al.	8–3–1878	Ca-2 607	892	Executive Order		President restores to public domain part of reservation set apart by Executive order of Oct. 3, 1873.	
Mission Indians – Agua Caliente No. 1 (Cupeno)	1–17–1880		898	Executive Order		President cancels a, part of Executive order of Dec. 27, 1875, as follows: All that portion of said order relating to the Agua Caliente NO. 1 (Cupeno) Indian reservation, and also that part relating to the Santa Ysabel Indian reservation. T.11S., R.3E.	
Mission Indians	3–9–1881		902	Executive Order		President sets apart additional tracts for Mission Indians	
Mission Indians – Pechanga	6–27–1882		906	Executive Order		President sets apart additional tracts for a reserve T.8S, R.2W	See Act of Mar. 3. 1873.
Mission Indians	7–24–1882		908	Executive Order		President cancels order of Dec. 27, 1865.	
Mission Indians	2–5–1883		910	Executive Order		President restores to public domain certain lands withdrawn by Executive order Dec. 27, 1875. sec. 3 T.12S, R.2E	
Mission Indians Barona Band	6–19–1883		912	Executive Order		President sets apart certain tracts for Mission Indians sec. 9, T.5S., R.1E. & T.14S., R.2E.	
Mission Indians Pechanga Tribe	1–25–1886		918	Executive Order		President cancels Executive order of June 27, 1882, so far as relates to lot 2 in sec. 28, T. 8S., R.2 W.	
Mission Indians	3–22–1886		918	Executive Order		President cancels and revokes Executive order of June 19, 1883. Sec. 28 T.4S., R.1E. SE of Fremont Ca.	
Mission Indians	1–29–1887		924	Executive Order		President amends order of Mar. 22, 1886, relative to reservation for Mission Indians. Sec. 28 T.4S., R.1E. SE of Fremont Ca.	
Mission Indians – Cahuilla	3–14–1887		924	Executive Order		The President sets apart as an addition to the Mission Indian reservation of Cahuilla Sec. 23, T.7S., R.2E.	
Mission Indians – Amah Mutsun	5–6–1889		934	Executive Order		The President orders certain lands to be withdrawn from sale and set apart as a reserve for the Mission Indians West of Gilroy T.10S., R.4E., & secs. 3&4. T.11S., R.4E.	Reservation lands and history (Note: Patents issued to J. J. Warner, Jan. 16, 1880, and to Harmon T. Helm, Jan. 16, 1886, are hereby withdrawn from sale and settlement, and set apart as a reservation for the Mission Indians: Provided, however, that any other tract or tracts the title of which h, as passed out of the U. S., or to which valid, legal rights have attached under existing laws of the U. S. providing for the disposition of the public domain, are also hereby excepted and excluded from the reservation hereby created.)
Mission Indians – ALL	1–12–1891		938	Act of Congress	Stat. L., XXVI, 712	Authorizes Secretary of the Interior to appoint three commissioners to select a reservation for each band or village so as to include as far as practicable the lands now occupied to a sufficient extent to meet their just requirements. It also authorizes all allotments in severalty on certain conditions.	
Hoopa et al.	10–16–1891	Ca-2 400 461	942	Executive Order		The President extends the limits of their reservation so as to include a tract of country 1 mile in width on each side of the Klamath river, and extending from the then limits thereof to the Pacific Ocean.	Reservation size and history (Note: This extension includes the land set apart to the Klamath Indians by Executive order, Nov. 16, 1855, which, however, was subsequently abandoned by them because of the destruction of their property by a great freshet. (See No. 400, California map 2.) This addition is shown by blue lines extending from the Hoopa reservation to the Pacific ocean. By act of Congress, June 17, 1892, this land was restored to the public domain, without reference to the Executive order of Oct. 16, 1891.)
Klamath River Reservation	6–17–1892	Ca-2 400	944	Act of Congress	Stat. L., XXVII, 52	Restores the original Klamath River reservation to the public domain. Provides for allotments to Indians settled thereon.	See executive order, Oct 16, 1891

== See also ==
- Mission Indians
- Indian Reductions
- California mission clash of cultures
- Population of Native California
- Aboriginal title in California
- Native Americans in California
- Slavery among Native Americans in the United States
- Genízaros
