= Indian Claims Commission =

US arbiter of native American claims

Map of Indian Land Areas Judicially Established by 1978, as determined by the Indian Claims Commission, and American Indian Reservations

The Indian Claims Commission (ICC) was a judicial relations arbiter between the United States federal government and Native American tribes. It was established under the Indian Claims Act of 1946 by the United States Congress to hear any longstanding claims of Indigenous tribes against the United States. The Commission created a process for tribes to address their grievances against the United States, and offered monetary compensation for territory lost as a result of broken federal treaties. Its purpose was to serve as a tribunal for hearing claims against the United States arising prior to that date by any Native American tribe or other identifiable group of Indigenous people living in the United States.

The Commission was created on August 13, 1946, after nearly 20 years of Congressional debates. In this it exercised primary jurisdiction that formerly rested with the United States Court of Claims. The Court of Claims had jurisdiction over claims arising after August 13, 1946 and subsequently after the ICC ended its operations on April 10, 1977 on any claims filed with the ICC and not yet fully resolved. The Commission was conceived as way to thank Native Americans for their unprecedented service in World War II and as a way to relieve the anxiety and resentment caused by the United States' history of colonization of indigenous peoples. The 1946 act allowed any "identifiable" group of native descendants to bring a cause of action, without regard to their federal recognition status. This led to many neglected Indian groups in the Southeast, the Northeast, and California organized tribal governments in order to pursue their claims, particularly for land. However, by accepting the government's monetary offer, the aggrieved tribe abdicated any right to raise their claim again in the future. On occasion, a tribe gave up federal recognition as part of the settlement of a claim.

The Commission was adjourned in 1978 by Public Law 94-465, which terminated the Commission and transferred its pending docket of 170 cases to the United States Court of Claims on September 30, 1978. It took until the late 1970s to complete most of them, with the last case finished in the early 21st century. By the time of the Commission's final report in 1979, it had awarded $818,172,606.64 in judgments and had completed 546 dockets.

== Land claims ==
Land was the dominant concern of the litigation by tribes before the Commission. The statutory authority did not permit this tribunal to grant or restore land to the tribes, but only to award money based upon a net acreage figure of lost lands times the monetary market value of an acre at the time of taking. This limitation on the authority of the ICC was resented by many tribal peoples, who wanted the return of their lands more than money—e.g., the Pit River Indians of northern California, and the Teton and Lakota of the Black Hills, South Dakota. In a few instances, by way of settlement acts, tribes gained some monetary funds to buy acreage when they had no communal land (as with the Penobscot and Passamaquoddy of Maine and the Catawba of the Carolinas). Special congressional acts on occasion did restore some acreage, as with the Havasupai at the Grand Canyon.

== Research ==
The methodology and theory of ethnohistorical research in general traces back to the work done by anthropologists and other scholars on claims before the Commission.Anthropologists, ethnologists, historians, and legalists were the dominant researchers and advocates for the plaintiff tribes and the defendant federal government. This expanded the amount of anthropological research on these tribes and led to the foundation of the Ohio Valley Historic Indian Conference, later the American Society for Ethnohistory (ASE). The research and historical reports compiled in evidence for Native American claims was first amassed in 1954 at the inaugural conference. A collection of the studies was published in the series American Indian Ethnohistory by Garland Publishing in 1974.

In preparing expert testimony for litigation brought by the tribes as plaintiffs or for the defense by the U.S. government, researchers explored all forms of data, including the earliest possible maps of original title—i.e., native or indigenous—territory and the cartographic presentations based upon treaties, statutes, and executive orders—generally identified as recognized title. In most cases, recognized title lands could be more easily demonstrated in litigation, while native territory depended upon Indian informants, explorers, trappers, military personnel, missionaries and early field ethnographers. Scholars sought to reconstruct native ecology in terms of food supply and other resources of the environment. In this way, some concept of original territory could be gained that could be mapped. As the Final Report of the ICC revealed, compromises over territorial parcels led to rejecting some acreage which had been used by more than one tribe over time.

The briefs, testimonies, quantum data, findings, and decisions were published in the 1970s in multiple series of microfiche by Clearwater Publishing Co., now owned by LexisNexis. Garland Publishing, NY, also in the 1970s, published some two hundred books containing some but not all of the materials pertaining to the claims cases.

Tribes such as the Poarch Band of Creek Indians of Alabama trace their modern federal status to the efforts of Chief Calvin McGhee and his 1950s work with the Indian Claims Commission.

Indian land claims were one of the key reasons the Bureau of Indian Affairs established its administrative Federal Acknowledgment Process in 1978.

== See also ==
- Checkerboarding (land)
- Off-reservation trust land
- Land Buy-Back Program for Tribal Nations
- Diminishment
