= Aboriginal title in California =

Land rights of indigenous peoples

Indigenous language regions in California (different colors indicate different languages; similar colors do not imply a relationship)

Aboriginal title in California refers to the aboriginal title land rights of the indigenous peoples of California. The state is unique in that no Native American tribe in California is the counterparty to a ratified federal treaty. Therefore, all the Indian reservations in the state were created by federal statute or executive order.

California has experienced less possessory land claim litigation than other states. This is primarily the result of the Land Claims Act of 1851 (following the Treaty of Guadalupe Hidalgo) that required all claims deriving from the Spanish and Mexican governments to be filed within two years. Three U.S. Supreme Court decisions and one Ninth Circuit ruling have held that the Land Claims Act applied to aboriginal title, and thus extinguished all aboriginal title in the state (as no tribes filed claims under the Act). Two Deputy Attorneys General of California have advocated this view.

== History ==
=== Spanish rule ===
Spain established twenty-one missions, indigenous peoples (the so-called Mission Indians) lived and worked under the supervision of missionaries. However, approximately 80% of the approximately 100,000 to 300,000 indigenous population of California remained outside the Missions. Spanish law fully recognized the customary title of indigenous peoples. Spanish-era land grants are referred to as the Ranchos of California.

=== Mexican rule ===
Mexico declared independence from Spain in 1824. Mexico secularized the Mission system, and granted some of these tribes their land in fee simple.

=== U.S. territory ===
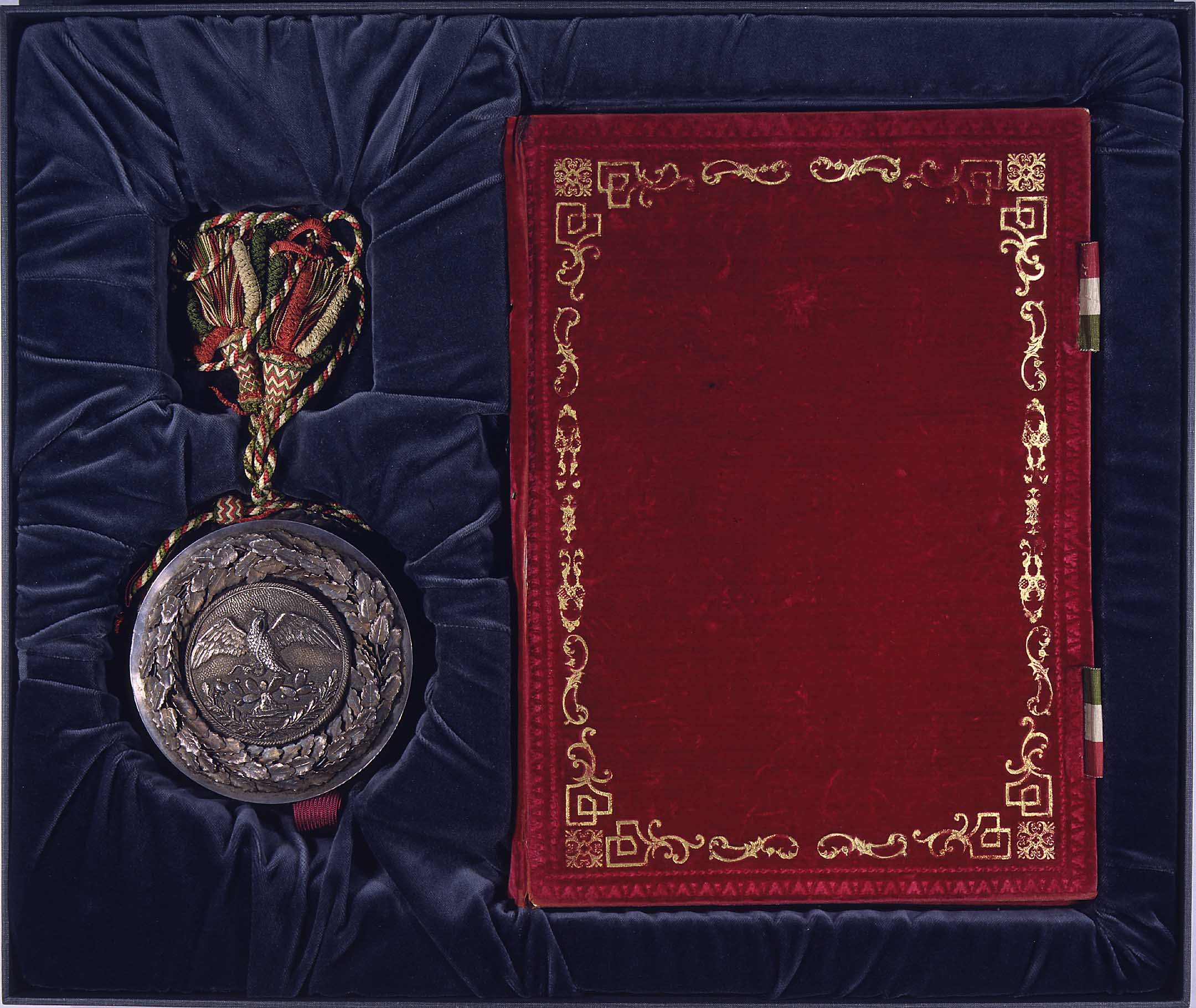
The Treaty of Guadalupe Hidalgo

Mexico ceded California to the US in 1848 pursuant to the Treaty of Guadalupe Hidalgo. Under Article Eight of that treaty, the United States agreed to respect the hundreds of land grants, many quite substantial, granted by the Spanish and Mexican governments to private landowners. Articles Nine and Ten guaranteed the property rights of Mexican nationals. The United States established procedures to review the validity of such land grants.

That same year gold was discovered in California, rapidly accelerating migration to California. Reports commissioned by the federal government during this period uniformly downplayed the extent of indigenous land rights under Spanish and Mexican rule.

=== Statehood ===
==== The eighteen unratified treaties ====
California was admitted as a U.S. state on September 9, 1850. The admission act made no reference to Native American land rights. On their second day in office as California's first Senators, John Fremont and William M. Gwin introduced bills to extinguish all aboriginal title in California. On September 30, 1850, Congress passed an amended version of Fremont's bill appropriating $25,000 and authorizing the President to appoint three commissioners, O. M. Wozencraft, Redick McKee and George W. Barbour, to negotiate treaties with the tribes of California. By January 1852, eighteen treaties had been negotiated, representing about one-third of the tribes and bands in the state. The state legislature strongly opposed the Indian reservation policy pursued by the treaty and lobbied the federal government to instead remove the Indians from the state entirely. Because Fremont and Gwin represented the key swing votes between the Whig and Democratic parties, none of the treaties were ever ratified and all were classified.

Federal agents had already persuaded nearly all of the Indians to remove to their would-be reservations while the treaties were pending; soon, "starvation, disease, and murder, also known as the California genocide, reduced their population to 17,000.

==== The Land Claims Act ====
On March 3, 1851, Congress enacted the California Land Act of 1851, sometimes known as the Land Claims Act, requiring "each and every person claiming lands in California by virtue of any right or title derived by the Mexican government" to file their claim with a three-member Public Land Commission within two years. The Commissioners were to issue patents to the claims they found meritorious and the other lands were to pass into the public domain at the end of the two years. Two years later, Congress passed an act to survey those lands that had passed into the public domain under the first statute, but exempted "land in the occupation or possession of any Indian tribe." That act also authorized the President to create five military reservations in California for Indian purposes.

The effect of these acts on aboriginal title in California has been a subject of litigation for 150 years. Regardless, the United States never again pursued treaty negotiations with California Indians, instead favoring legislation and executive orders. By statute, Congress created several Indian reservations. Congress gave the executive the discretion to create further reservations. By 1986, Presidents had used this discretion to create 117 reservations totaling 632,000 acres (256,000 ha).

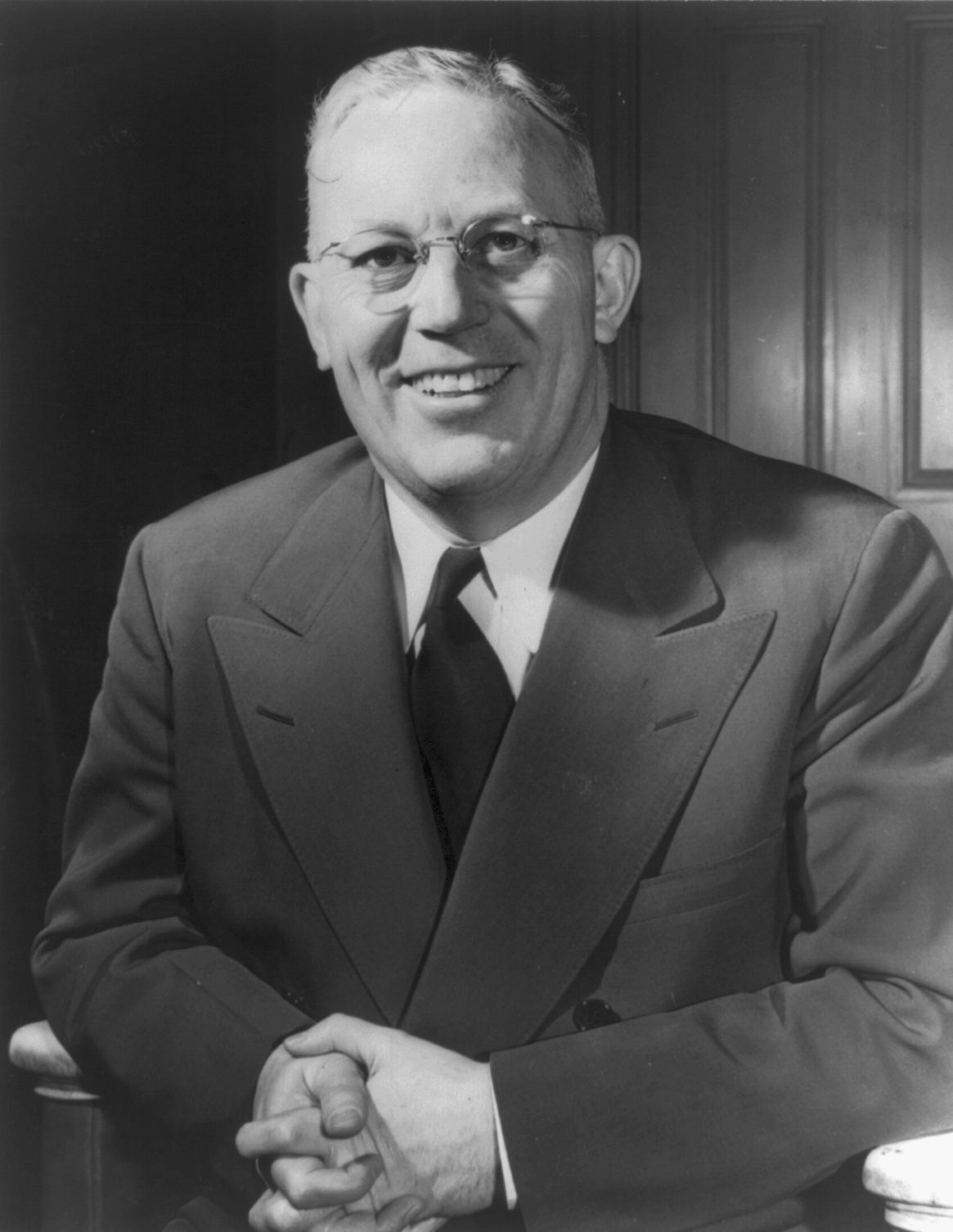
Future Chief Justice Earl Warren argued the tribes' claims in the Court of Claims.

==== Claims Court litigation ====
In 1927, the California legislature passed a statute authorizing the California Attorney General to bring claims on behalf of the tribes in the Court of Claims. The next year, Congress passed a statute granting that court jurisdiction for such claims. California Attorney General Earl Warren (future Chief Justice) finally argued the case in 1941. The court found liability but indicated it would not award pre-judgment interest, and the Supreme Court declined to grant certiorari. Warren negotiated a $5M settlement. After the passage of the Indian Claims Commission Act, the same group of tribes struggled to bring a single action for recovery under the broader claims allowed under the ICCA, which settled for $29M.

== Effect of the Land Claims Act of 1851 ==
=== Early California Supreme Court decisions ===
The earliest cases heard by the Supreme Court under the Land Claims Act involved non-Indians. Therefore, in Thompson v. Doaksum (1886), the California Supreme Court considered the application of the Act to Indians as a matter of first impression. The court upheld a quiet title judgment for the plaintiff, holding: "If defendants [Indians belonging to the Big Meadows tribe] had any right to the land, it should have been asserted in the land department pending the application for patent, or by direct proceeding on the part of the government to set aside the patent."

Two years later, Byrne v. Alas (1888), the court distinguished its holding by reversing a quiet title judgment against a group of Mission Indians. Byrne, in distinguishing Doaksum, held that the fact of a third party validating title to certain lands was conclusive of the fact that those lands were not in the public domain, and thus, that the aboriginal title was not extinguished.

There, the Mission Indians did not claim fee simple by any Mexican grant, but rather "by virtue of their possession, and the continuous, open, and exclusive use and occupancy by their predecessors and ancestors ever since the year 1815." Further, the court interpreted the language in the Land Claims Act requiring the Commissioner to investigate the status of indigenous tenure as evidence that "Congress did not intend that the rights of the Indians should be cut off by a failure on their part to present their claims."

=== Barker v. Harvey (1901) ===
In Barker v. Harvey (1901), the Supreme Court heard the consolidated appeals of a group of Mission Indians who had lost a quiet title action by several non-Indians. The appeal to the Supreme Court was brought by the federal government in its trustee capacity. Justice Brewer, for a unanimous Court (White recused), affirmed.

Barker has two independent holdings. First, the Court reaffirmed its holding from Botiller v. Dominguez (1889) that even perfect title was subject to the requirements of the Land Claims Act. Barker rejected in part the reasoning of the California Supreme Court from Byrne, noting: "Surely a claimant would have little reason for presenting to the land commission his claim to land, and securing a confirmation of that claim, if the only result was to transfer the naked fee to him, burdened by an Indian right of permanent occupancy." Thus, Barker has since been cited by the Court as the source of the rule that the Land Claims Act itself extinguished aboriginal title.

Second, the Court held that the plaintiff's title had been extinguished before the Mexican Cession. To determine this, the Court examined and quoted extensively the specific text of the plaintiff's grants. From this, the Court concluded that the aboriginal title had long been extinguished by abandonment:

It thus appears that prior to the cession the Mexican authorities, upon examination, found that the Indians had abandoned the land; that the only adverse claim was vested in the mission of San Diego and made an absolute grant, subject only to the condition of satisfying whatever claims the mission might have. How can it be said therefore that when the cession was made by Mexico to the United States there was a present recognition by the Mexican government of the occupancy of these Indians? On the contrary, so far as any official action is disclosed, it was distinctly to the contrary, and carried with it an affirmation that they had abandoned their occupancy, and that whatever of title there was outside of the Mexican nation was in the mission, and an absolute grant was made subject only to the rights of such mission.

=== United States v. Title Ins. & Trust Co. (1923) ===
More than two decades later, the Court reconsidered the meaning and propriety of its Barker decision in United States v. Title Ins. & Trust Co. (1923). There, the federal government sued on behalf of a group of Mission Indians holding an 1842 Mexican grant. The court cited reliance considerations of stare decisis in declining the government's request to overrule Barker:

The decision was given 23 years ago, and affected many tracts of land in California, particularly in the southern part of the state. In the meantime there has been a continuous growth and development in that section, land values have enhanced, and there have been many transfers. Naturally there has been reliance on the decision. The defendants in this case purchased 15 years after it was made. It has become a rule of property, and to disturb it now would be fraught with many injurious results. Besides, the government and the scattered Mission Indians have adjusted their situation to it in several instances.

=== Super v. Work (1926) ===
Super v. Work (1926) involved a challenge in the Supreme Court of the District of Columbia (now known as the United States District Court for the District of Columbia) to the construction of federal hydroelectric dams in California. The plaintiffs, members of the Karuk and Peh-tsick tribes, alleged both that the dams would violate their aboriginal title rights and their rights under the Treaty of Guadalupe Hidalgo. The United States Court of Appeals for the District of Columbia held that both rights (if they existed) were extinguished by the 1851 statute. Unlike the plaintiffs in Barker, who were Mission Indians, the plaintiffs here were nomadic at the time of the relevant times.

In a one-sentence per curiam opinion, the Court affirmed the D.C. Circuit, citing Barker, Title Insurance, Lone Wolf v. Hitchcock (1903), and Conley v. Ballinger (1910). The Karuk attempt to re-assert their claims decades later based upon the federal government's general trust relationship and other statutes were unsuccessful. Since Super, the Court has twice interpreted the Land Claims Act to also have imposed the requirement to file upon the state of California itself.

=== United States ex rel. Chunie v. Ringrose (1986) ===
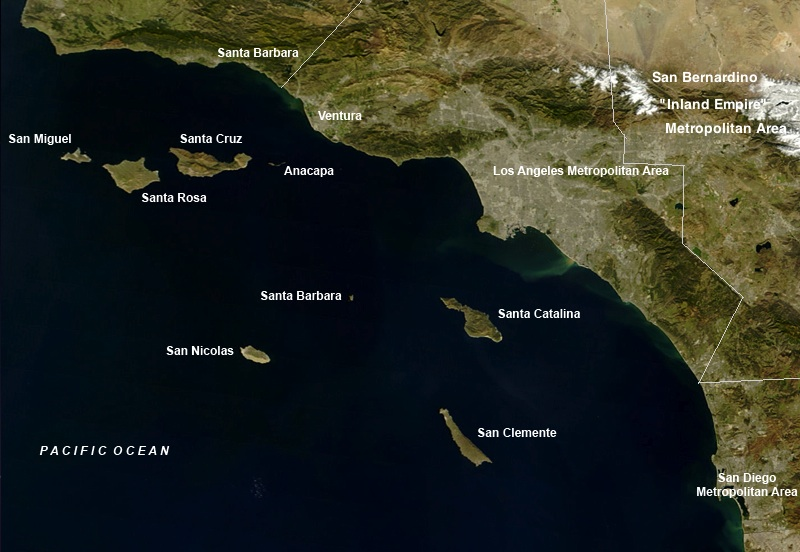
The Channel Islands of California, unsuccessfully claimed by the Chumash

In United States ex rel. Chunie v. Ringrose (1986), the United States Court of Appeals for the Ninth Circuit considered the trespass and conversion claims of Chumash tribe (joined by the federal government) over the ownership of the Channel Islands of California (and the channel beds surrounding the Santa Cruz and Santa Rosa islands) in California. The Ninth Circuit held that, although the Chumash's aboriginal title survived the issuance of Mexican land grants to the same islands, the tribe's title was extinguished by its failure to file under the Land Claims Act.

First, the Ninth Circuit disagreed with the District Court's holding that Mexican land grants had extinguished the Chumash's title. Instead, the court applied the same standards to Mexican land grants as would have been applied to federal land grants: the grants were presumed to grant an interest subject to the tribe's aboriginal title. Next, the Ninth Circuit rejected the tribe's arguments that the islands were not within the land ceded by the Treaty of Guadalupe Hidalgo. Third, the court rejected the Chumash's argument that the Treaty converted the tribe's aboriginal title into recognized title.

Finally, the court reached the question of the Land Claims Act. The Ninth Circuit examined the rule of Barker, Title Insurance, and Super. As for Barker, the court conceded that "the precise basis for this holding is not clear." With respect to Title Insurance, the court noted that it is "not entirely clear in the opinion" that the case involved aboriginal title, but inferred such from subsequent interpretations of that decision.

The Chumash attempted to distinguish these cases by relying on Cramer v. United States (1923), the case that established the existence of "individual aboriginal title" (as opposed to tribal); Cramer, after all, had distinguished Barker. Thus, "[g]iven the line of Supreme Court decisions recognizing the extensive reach of the Act of 1851," the Ninth Circuit stated that Cramer could only avail those whose individual aboriginal title post-dated 1851. The court also rejected the Chumash's attempt to interpret the Act according to canons of international law.

The Supreme Court denied certiorari.

== Individual aboriginal title ==
=== Cramer v. United States (1923) ===
Cramer v. United States (1923) involved would-be Indian reservations (as provided for in the aforementioned unratified treaties) that had subsequently been granted to railroads by the federal government. The United States District Court for the Northern District of California canceled the railroad's land patents based upon the actual use and occupation of the Indians since 1855. The Ninth Circuit agreed with the District Court, but cancelled the entirety of the patents at issue.

The Supreme Court considered six arguments by the railroad. First, it rejected the railroad's argument that the exceptions to the grant did not specifically mention Indians; instead, the court held that all land grants are presumed to be granted subject to aboriginal title.

Next, the Court considered the Act of 1851. The Court held that it was irrelevant:

The act plainly has no application. The Indians here concerned do not belong to any of the classes described therein and their claims were in no way derived from the Spanish or Mexican governments. Moreover, it does not appear that these Indians were occupying the lands in question when the act was passed.

Third, the Court rejected the argument that the federal government could not bring suit on behalf of the tribe. Fourth, the Court rejected the statute limiting the time in which the government could challenge the validity of its land patents, holding that did not apply to suits on behalf of Indians. Fifth, the Court rejected estoppel: "Since these Indians with the implied consent of the government had acquired such rights of occupancy as entitled them to retain possession as against the defendants, no officer or agent of the government had authority to deal with the land upon any other theory." Finally, however, the Court reversed the Ninth Circuit's voiding of the entire patents, holding that only the portions possessed by the Indians should be void.

The holding in Cramer lay dormant for many years. Decade later, Justice Douglas dissented to the denial of certiorari where the lower court had denied a California Indian defendant the ability to defend a criminal prosecution for illegal logging on the basis of individual aboriginal title as recognized in Cramer. The Court has since elaborated on the basis for its holding in Cramer:

This holding was based upon the well-understood governmental policy of encouraging the Indian to forgo his wandering habits and adopt those of civilized life; and it was said that to hold that by so doing he acquired no possessory rights to the lands occupied, to which the government would accord protection, would be contrary to the whole spirit of the traditional American policy toward these dependent wards of the nation. The fact that such right of occupancy finds no recognition in any statute or other formal governmental action is not conclusive.

=== United States v. Dann (1989) ===
United States v. Dann (1989) is the most in-depth consideration of individual aboriginal title since Cramer. There, although the relevant tribal aboriginal title had been extinguished, and an ordinance prohibited entry onto the federal lands in question, the Court found that the defendants could and did establish individual aboriginal title based on their use of the lands before the ordinance. The Ninth Circuit (in an appeal from Nevada, not California) held:

[An individual] establish[es] aboriginal title in much the same manner that a tribe does. An individual might be able to show that his or her lineal ancestors held and occupied, as individuals, a particular tract of land, to the exclusion of all others, from time immemorial, and that this title had never been extinguished.

However, the Ninth Circuit concluded that the federal policies in place at the time of Cramer had changed and thus:

In short, an Indian cannot today gain a right of occupancy simply by occupying public land, as the Indians did in Cramer. Under current law, that occupancy could not be viewed as undertaken with the implied consent of the government, as was the occupancy in Cramer. We therefore conclude that any individual occupancy rights acquired by the Danns must have had their inception prior to November 26, 1934, the date that the lands in question were withdrawn from entry by Executive Order No. 6910.

Individual aboriginal title is a fact-specific and fact-intensive defense, which is difficult to raise as a criminal affirmative defense, for which the defendant has the burden of proof.

== See also ==
- Act for the Government and Protection of Indians
- California Indian Wars, 1850–1880
- California Land Act of 1851
- California Indian Reservations and Cessions
- Indian Reorganization Act
- Indian Claims Commission
- Indian termination policy
  - California Rancheria Termination Acts
- Territorial evolution of California
