= Golden Checkerboard =

1965 book about the Agua Caliente Band of Cahuilla Indians

- Author: Ed Ainsworth
- Language: English
- Subject: Cahuilla Indians—government relations; McCabe, Hilton H.
- Publisher: Desert-Southwest
- Publication date: 1965
- Publication place: United States
- Media type: Hardback and paperback
- Pages: 195
- OCLC: 4391736
- Dewey Decimal: 347.2
- LC Class: E99.C155 A6

Golden Checkerboard (1965) is a book by Ed Ainsworth about the mid-20th century economic conditions of the Agua Caliente Band of Cahuilla Indians of Palm Springs, California and the history of the 99-year lease law, which enabled them to commercially develop tribal-owned lands. It focuses on Indio Superior Court Judge Hilton McCabe, who is described as "The Little White Father of the Indians of Palm Springs" and recalls the steps taken by McCabe to set up conservatorships and leases that would give the tribe investment opportunities and economic self-sufficiency.

The title of the book refers to the Agua Caliente Band of Cahuilla Indians' reservation checkerboard pattern, originating from land grants to the Southern Pacific Railroad as an incentive to build rail lines through the region, when President Ulysses S. Grant signed an Executive Order granting "San Bernardino Base and Meridian, Township 4 South, Range 4 East, Section 14" to the Agua Caliente Indians.

== Historical context ==
Section 14, which included the warm springs at the center of Palm Springs, and other sections surrounding Palm Springs, were "owned" by the Indians, but held "in trust" by the federal government; the Indians charged fees for bathing in the springs and picnicking in the canyon. In 1917, Congress passed the Allotment Act (39 Stat. 969, 976) (Note: In fact the original General Allotment Act was the Dawes Act, passed in 1887. "Q&A with Agua Caliente Tribal Chairman Richard Milanovich". Desert Sun. March 19, 2012) which directed the Secretary of the Interior to divide and distribute the Indian land; Harry E. Wadsworth was appointed as the allotting agent. In 1927, the Secretary instructed Wadsworth to make a new schedule of allotments, which he did for the 24 members of the Band who made written applications. (In fact the allotments were not carried out; Band member Lee Arenas sued the federal government to have the allotments made legal and won his case in the United States Supreme Court. (Note: In 1937 the federal government ceased to recognize the traditional tribal leaders and placed a federal agent in their place. Chief Francisco Patencio was active in opposing the allotments and loss of tribal authority, traveling to Washington, D.C., to meet with Office of Indian Affairs Commissioner John Collier. Aqua Caliente Cultural Museum: Francisco Patencio)) In December 1944, Secretary of the Interior Oscar Chapman, acting on the advice of Commissioner of Indian Affairs John Collier, disapproved the allotting schedule set up by Wadsworth 17 years earlier.

== Conservatorship program ==
=== Odlum Report ===
In January 1953, Douglas McKay became Secretary of the Interior. After that McKay asked industrialist Floyd B. Odlum (former president of Atlas Corp. and husband of Jacqueline Cochran) to investigate the affairs of the Agua Caliente Indians. The report by Odlum's committee was completed in April 1955 and put into final form in April 1956. Among other things, Odlum's report determined: that the Band consisted of 83 persons, the majority of whom were minors; the value of the Indian land, allotted and unallotted, totaled as much as $12,000,000; and the value of the land could increase with proper development. Odlum also discussed the legal problems related to unequal allotments, taxes on non-productive real estate, the inability to lease land because of a 5-year limit, and conflicting claims of the allottees. The report recommended that the Indian land be placed in a private corporation or trusteeship rather than existing wardship. Odlum's recommendations were not implemented because newly elected Congressman Dalip Singh Saund, who ran against Cochran in a bitter election campaign, blocked proposed legislation. In the meantime, Congress passed Public Law No. 255 in August 1955, which allowed for leases of 50 years.

=== 1959 legislation ===
In 1959, a landmark decision by the Secretary of the Interior equalized allotted Indian lands, thereby setting the stage for developing Indian lands within the city of Palm Springs. This same legislation, however, recognizing the potential value of Indian lands within the boundaries of a world-famous resort, also called for the appointment of conservators and guardians to "protect" Indians and their estates from "artful and designing persons" who might otherwise cheat them out of their properties, which could now be legally sold by the individual tribal members who owned them. By declaring Indians as "incompetent" (both as children and adults) court-appointed conservators and guardians took control of a majority of Indian estates. A major oversight of the program was the appointment of judges, lawyers, and business people as Indian conservators and guardians—the very people the program sought to protect Indians and their estates from. The program was administered by the Indio Superior Court's Judge Hilton McCabe, subject of Golden Checkerboard. McCabe concurrently acted as a conservator to a number of tribal members and an executor, in addition to his administrative and legal roles. (Note: As a result of the conservatorship program the Band was able to lease land to businesses. The Spa Hotel opened in November 1962, with Eileen Miguel, head of the Band, U.S. Grant IV, great-grandson of President Grant, and McCabe at the opening ceremony. In 1961, 41 members of the Band signed a petition to McCabe thanking him for his efforts. Niemann, Greg (2005). Palm Springs Legends: Creation of a desert oasis. San Diego, CA: Sunbelt Publications. p. 186. ISBN 978-0932653741. LCCN 2005021837. OCLC 61211290.)

== Post-publication ==
=== Reviews ===
The book received favorable reviews from Desert Magazine and the American Bar Association Journal.

=== Withdrawal from publication ===
Following a lawsuit by the Indians against the "distorted, glorifying biography", the publisher withdrew the book from the market.

=== Disclosure of misconduct ===
With the ability to control Indian estates, the conservatorship program fostered corruption among the conservators and administrators—a series of Pulitzer Prize (1968) winning Riverside Press-Enterprise articles authored by journalist George Ringwald exposed such instances of excessive fees, fee-splitting, and other types of questionable conduct. The conservatorship program was officially ended in 1968 after the Secretary of the Interior's Palm Springs Task Force similarly exposed it as fraudulent and corrupt.

== See also ==
- Aboriginal title in California
- Indian Civil Rights Act of 1968
- Indian Reorganization Act of June 18, 1934 – slowed the process of allocations to individual Native Americans
- Indian Self-Determination and Education Assistance Act of 1975
- Indian termination policy
- Native American gaming
- Native American self-determination
- Outline of United States federal Indian law and policy
- Tribal sovereignty in the United States
