= O. M. Wozencraft =

American physician

Oliver Meredith Wozencraft
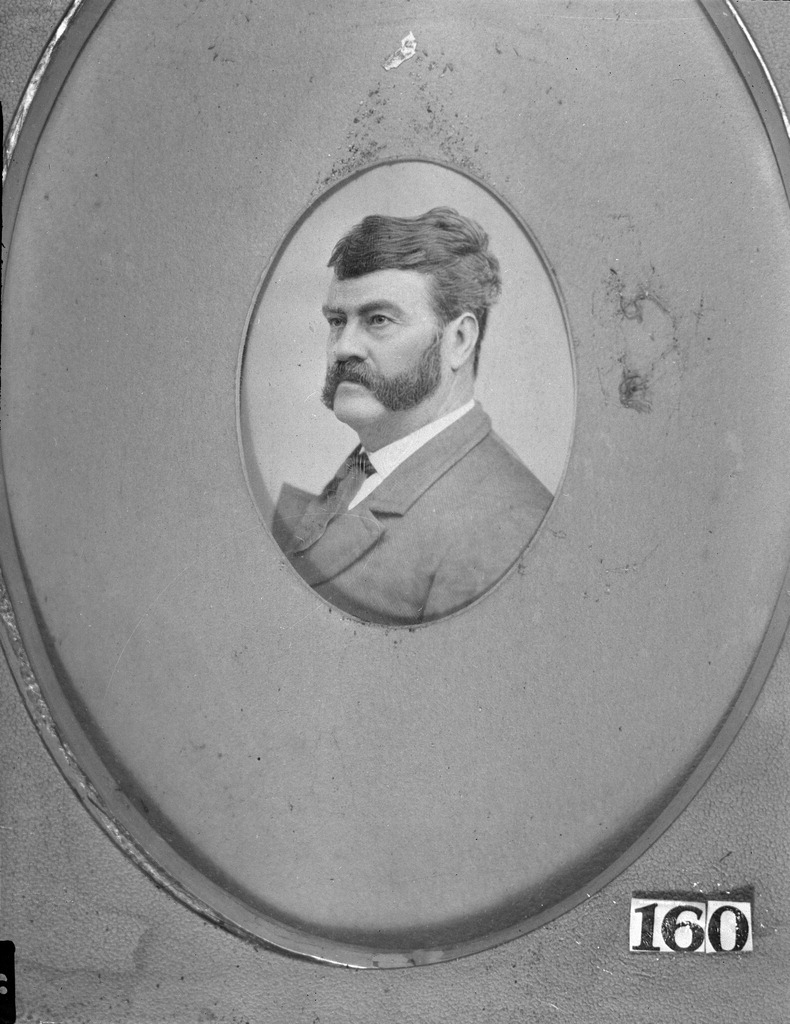
- Born: July 26, 1814; Clermont County, Ohio, US
- Died: November 22, 1887 (aged 73); Washington, D.C., US
- Occupations: Physician, United States Indian Agent, Land Developer
- Spouse: Lamiza A. Ramsey
- Children: 7

Oliver M. Wozencraft (July 26, 1814 – November 22, 1887) was an American settler in California who negotiated treaties between California Native American Indian tribes and the United States of America. Later, Wozencraft promoted a plan to provide irrigation to the Imperial Valley.

== Life ==
=== Early years ===
Wozencraft was born in Clermont County, Ohio, June 26, 1814. He graduated with a degree in medicine from St. Joseph's College in Bardstown, Kentucky. Wozencraft married Lamiza A. Ramsey (June 13, 1818 – August 30, 1905) in Nashville, Tennessee on February 23, 1837. In 1848, leaving his wife and three small children in New Orleans directly after a cholera epidemic, he relocated to Brownsville, Texas.

After the cholera epidemic swept Brownsville in February through April 1849, upon hearing news of gold being discovered, Wozencraft decided to seek his fortune in California. Wozencraft arrived at Yuma, Arizona in May 1849, crossed the Colorado Desert in difficult circumstances, then arrived in California.

=== California Constitutional Convention ===
Wozencraft settled in Stockton, California and was elected as delegate to the California Constitutional Convention in Monterey in 1849 representing the district of San Joaquin.

Wozencraft spoke against the admission of African Americans to California:

We have declared, by a unanimous vote, that neither slavery nor involuntary servitude shall ever exist in this State. I desire now to cast my vote in favor of the proposition just submitted, prohibiting the negro race from coming amongst us; and this I profess to do as a philanthropist, loving my kind, and rejoicing in their rapid march toward perfectibility. If there was just reason why slavery should not exist in this land, there is just reason why that part of the family of man, who are so well adapted for servitude, should be excluded from amongst us. It would appear that the all-wise Creator has created the negro to serve the white race. We see evidence of this wherever they are brought in contact; we see the instinctive feeling of the negro is obedience to the white man, and, in all instances, he obeys him, and is ruled by him. If you would wish that all mankind should be free, do not bring the two extremes in the scale of organization together; do not bring the lowest in contact with the highest, for be assured the one will rule and the other must serve.

— Oliver M. Wozencraft

He also moved that a two term limit apply to the position of Governor of California. That question was debated then rejected.

Wozencraft's signature appears on the handwritten parchment copy of the constitution signed by the delegates on October 13, 1849.

=== Treaties with Native Americans ===
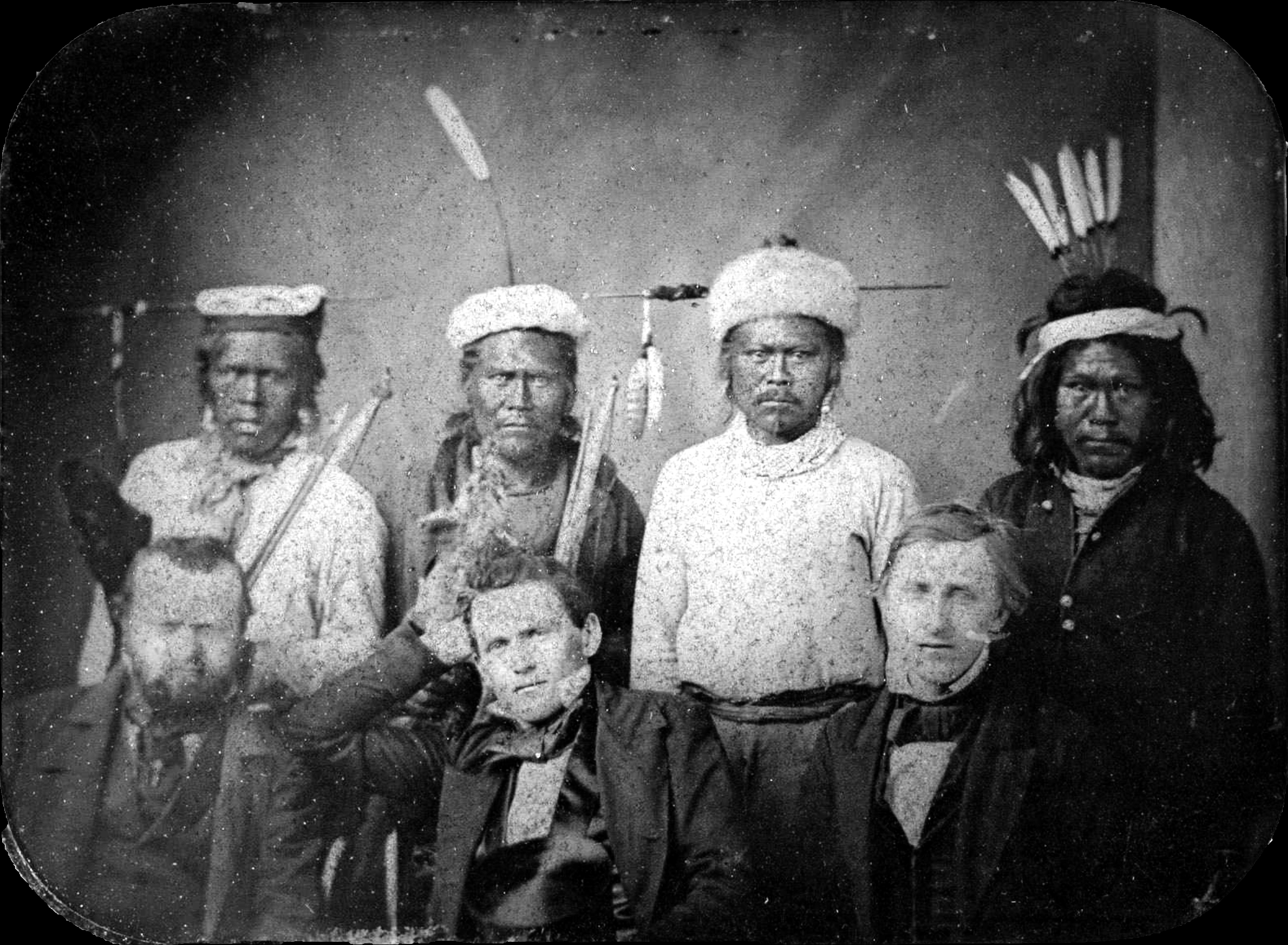
Original title: Maidu Headmen with Treaty Commissioners. Wozencraft is seated center front. Image was captured on or around August 1, 1851 at Bidwell's Ranch at Big Chico Creek.

On July 8, 1850, President Millard Fillmore appointed Wozencraft as an Indian Agent of the United States. Salary and expenses were not provided to Wozencraft for this appointment. On October 15, 1850, his title as Indian Agent was suspended and he, Redick McKee and George W. Barbour were appointed "commissioners 'to hold treaties with various Indian tribes in the State of California,' as provided in the act of Congress approved September 30, 1850." In that role Wozencraft was paid eight dollars per day plus ten cents per mile travelled.

Between March 19, 1851, and January 7, 1852, Wozencraft, McKee and Barbour traversed California and negotiated 18 treaties with Native American tribes. The treaties were submitted to the United States Senate on June 1, 1852. They were considered and rejected for ratification by the Senate in closed session. The treaties were then sealed from public record until January 18, 1905.

Fillmore removed Wozencraft's standing as an Indian Agent on August 28, 1852.

=== Imperial Valley Irrigation ===
Wozencraft was an advocate for creating a gravity-fed canal from the Colorado River to provide irrigation to the Salton Sink area of the Colorado Desert (now known as the Imperial Valley). Around 1854 to 1855 he hired Ebenezer Hadley, County Surveyor of Los Angeles and Deputy County Surveyor of San Bernardino, to survey a route for the canal. In 1859 Wozencraft successfully lobbied the California State Legislature to provisionally allocate 3,000,000 acres (12,141 km^{2}) of the Colorado Desert to himself for the scheme.

Wozencraft required passage of federal legislation (e.g. H.R.3219) to finalize the land allocation approved by the state legislature. This would allow him to secure capital to complete the project. He unsuccessfully lobbied the United States Congress for this allocation for the remainder of his life.

== Death and legacy ==
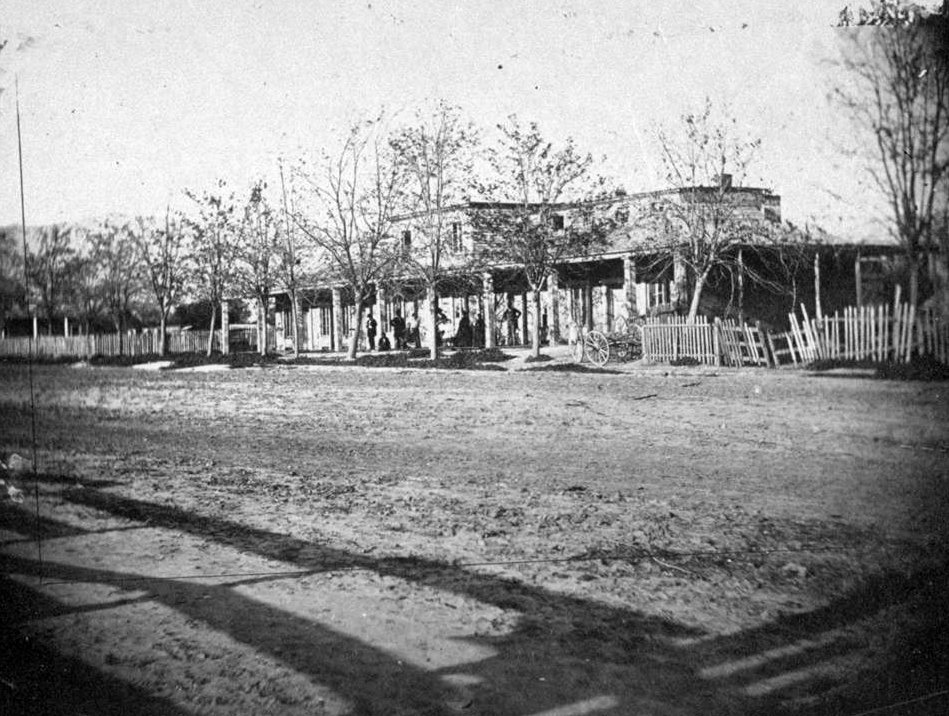
The San Bernardino house of recalled Mormon Apostle Amasa Lyman was the residence of Wozencraft and his family in 1863.

Wozencraft died of a heart attack on November 22, 1887, in a boardinghouse in Washington, D.C. He had been in Washington to again present a Colorado Desert irrigation scheme bill to Congress. Just prior to his death the bill had been killed in committee. In committee the bill was described as a "fantastic folly of an old man".

Work began on the Alamo Canal 13 years after Wozencraft's death, ultimately providing irrigation to the Imperial Valley in a manner similar to that first proposed by Wozencraft almost 50 years earlier. He has been declared the "Father of the Imperial Valley."

Modern evaluations of the treaties he negotiated with California Native Americans are critical:

Taken all together, one cannot imagine a more poorly conceived, more inaccurate, less informed, and less democratic process than the making of the 18 treaties in 1851-52 with the California Indians. It was a farce from beginning to end.

Nineteenth century evaluations are likewise scathing:

There was a very general impression in the state, and apparently pretty well founded, that [Wozencraft, McKee and Barbour] knew little about the country and still less about the Indians; and that everything they did was a mistake and almost everything in excess of their powers. They appear to have traveled about in considerable style and at very great expense, but accomplished nothing of importance. They made presents and promises in abundance, but got nothing of value in return. None of their treaties were approved; and nearly all the debts they contracted were repudiated as unauthorized. The reservations they established were nearly, if not entirely, useless and very unpopular...

Wozencraft is buried at the San Bernardino Pioneer Memorial Cemetery.
