= Land Buy-Back Program for Tribal Nations =

- Type: Government program
- Cause: Cobell v. Salazar
- Organized by: United States Department of the Interior

The Land Buy-Back Program for Tribal Nations implements the land consolidation component of the Cobell v. Salazar Settlement, which provided $1.9 billion to purchase fractional interests in trust or restricted land from willing sellers at fair market value. Consolidated interests are immediately restored to tribal trust ownership for uses benefiting the reservation community and tribal members.

There are approximately 243,000 owners of nearly three million fractional interests across Native Country who are eligible to participate in the Buy-Back Program. The Program identified 105 locations where implementation would occur through mid-2021. In a Federal Register notice published in April 2017, the Program announced that new Departmental leadership was taking a fresh look at progress to date and strategies that would further maximize the consolidation of fractional interests such as further sharing of appraisals, focusing on land value, interest size (e.g., less than 25% ownership in a tract), and tract control; facilitating co-owner purchases; or revising the schedule of 105 locations (e.g., adding or removing locations and/or returning to locations that already received offers).

== See also ==
- Land Back
- White Earth Land Recovery Project
- Checkerboarding
- Off-reservation trust land
- Diminishment
