= Reid D. Milanovich =

American politician (born 1982/83)

Chair of the Agua Caliente Band of Cahuilla Indians
- In office April 5, 2022 – April 7, 2026
- Preceded by: Jeff Grubbe
- Succeeded by: Jeff Grubbe

Vice Chair of the Agua Caliente Band of Cahuilla Indians
- In office November 5, 2019 – April 5, 2022
- Preceded by: Larry N. Olinger
- Succeeded by: Vincent Gonzales III

Personal details
- Born: 1982 or 1983 (age 42–43) U.S.
- Spouse: Halstyn Milanovich
- Relations: LaVerne Saubel (grandmother); Richard M. Milanovich (father)
- Education: California Baptist University
- Profession: Politician

Reid D. Milanovich (born 1982 or 1983) is a Cahuilla politician and served as the Chairman of the Agua Caliente Band of Cahuilla Indians from April 2022 to 2026, in Riverside County, California. He has served five terms on the tribal council.

== Early life and education ==
Reid D. Milanovich was born in the early 1980s. His father is Richard Milanovich, who served as Agua Caliente Band of Cahuilla Indians Chairman for 28 years. His mother is Melissa Milanovich. Reid Milanovich has five siblings: one sister and four brothers. His grandmother was LaVerne Saubel, who served on the council for the tribe and co-authored the tribe's constitution.

Milanovich earned his bachelor's degree from California Baptist University in political science.

== Career ==
Milanovich never had interest in politics, despite his father's involvement, until he returned to Palm Springs after college in 2011. He started attending Agua Caliente Band of Cahuilla Indians tribal meetings. He joined the tribe's scholarship commission and from 2012 through 2014 served as a board member of the Agua Caliente Cultural Museum board of directors.

He ran for election on the tribal council unsuccessfully in 2013. He eventually served as a proxy for the tribal council. He was elected to the tribal council in April 2014. In November 2019, he became Vice Chairman of the Agua Caliente Band of Cahuilla Indians in the wake of a special election after the July 2019 death of then vice chairman Larry N. Olinger. Milanovich spoke at the funeral of Olinger. On April 5, 2022, Milanovich was sworn in as Chairman of the Agua Caliente Band of Cahuilla Indians.

== Personal life ==
He lives in Palm Springs, California.
