= Diminishment =

US legal process

Diminishment is the legal process by which the United States Congress can reduce the size of an Indian reservation.

== History ==
In 1984, the United States Supreme Court held in Solem v. Bartlett, 465 U.S. 463 (1984), that "only Congress may diminish the boundaries of an Indian reservation, and its intent to do so must be clear." This was noted in the Court's 2016 case Nebraska v. Parker, 577 U.S. ___ (2016), in which the Court held that an 1882 Act passed by Congress did not diminish the Omaha Reservation.

The Solem case established a "diminishment doctrine" that U.S. courts could use when evaluating whether diminishment had taken place.

In the 1994 case Hagen v. Utah, 510 U.S. 399 (1994), the Supreme Court held that Congress's 1902 Act had diminished the Uintah Reservation. The Court applied its doctrine established in the Solem case.

== See also ==
- Dawes Act
- Curtis Act
- Checkerboarding (land)
- Diminished value
- Diminished responsibility
- Off-reservation trust land
- Land Buy-Back Program for Tribal Nations
- Eminent domain in the United States
- Indian old field

== Notes ==
Diminishment commonly refers to the reduction in size of a reservation. A finding of diminishment generally suggests that a discrete, easily identifiable parcel of land has been removed from reservation status.
