= Agua Caliente Band of Cahuilla Indians =

Indian tribe in California, United States

Coordinates: 33°47′02″N 116°31′57″W

- Indian reservation
- Seal
- Interactive map of Agua Caliente Band of Cahuilla Indians
- Country: United States
- State: California
- County: Riverside

Government
  - Chair: Jeff L. Grubbe
  - Vice Chair: Anthony W. Purnel
  - Secretary/Treasurer: Savana R. Saubel
  - Tribal Council: Vincent Gonzales III; Moraino J. Patencio

Area
  - Land: 31.6102 sq mi (81.870 km^{2})

Population (2020)
  - Total: 27,090
  - Density: 857.0/sq mi (330.9/km^{2})
- Time zone: UTC−8 (Pacific Time Zone)
  - Summer (DST): UTC−7 (Pacific Daylight Time)
- Area codes: 760/442
- Website: aguacaliente.org

Agua Caliente Band of Cahuilla Indians
Total population
- 2010: 410 alone and in combination

Regions with significant populations
- United States (California)

Languages
- English, Cahuilla language

Religion
- Indigenous religion, Catholicism, and Christianity

Related ethnic groups
- other Cahuilla people

The Agua Caliente Band of Cahuilla Indians of the Agua Caliente Indian Reservation is a federally recognized tribe of the Cahuilla, located in Riverside County, California, United States. The Cahuilla lived in the Coachella Valley desert and surrounding mountains between 5000 BCE and 500 CE. With the establishment of the reservations, the Cahuilla were officially divided into 10 sovereign nations, including the Agua Caliente Band.

== Reservation ==
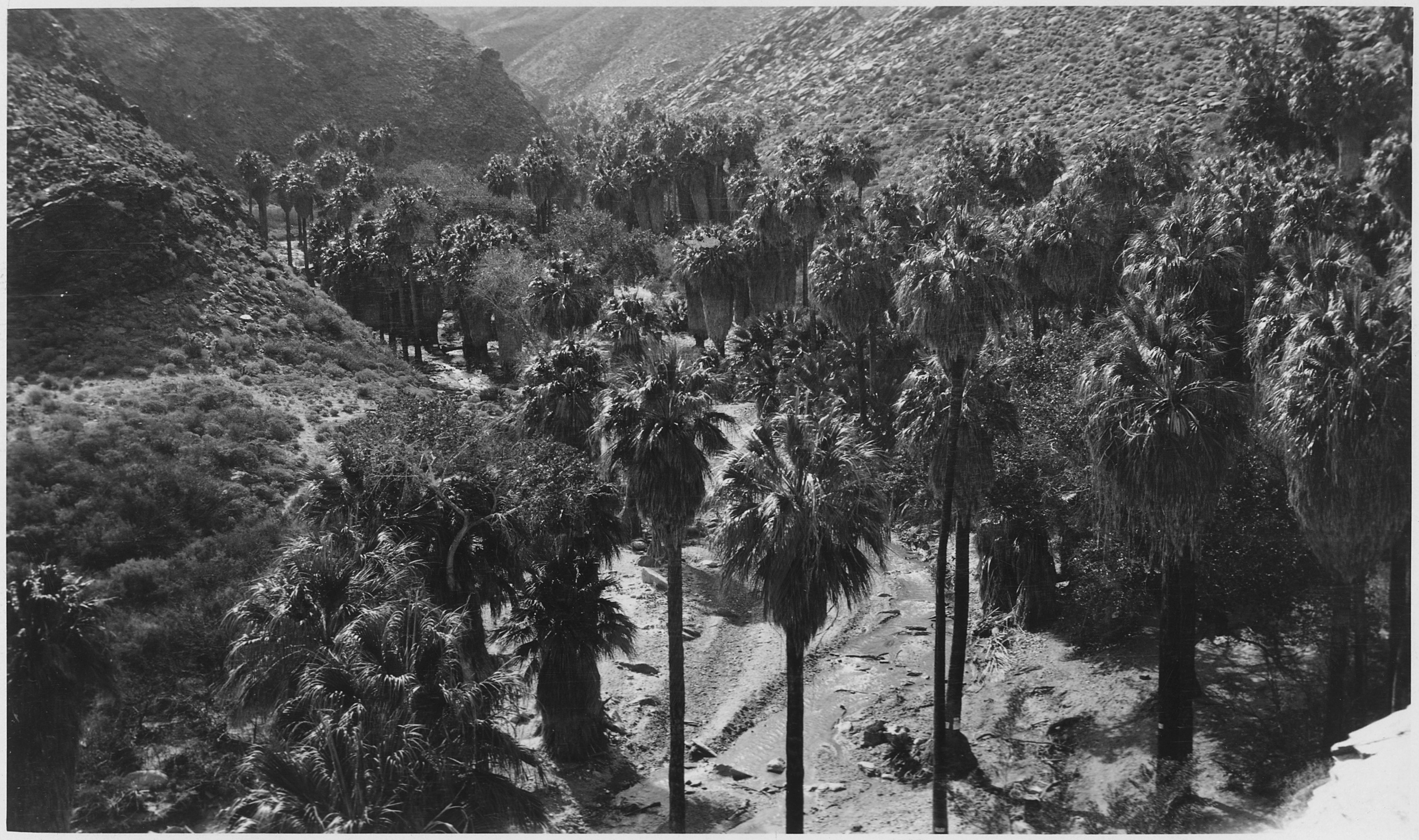
Agua Caliente Reservation in 1928

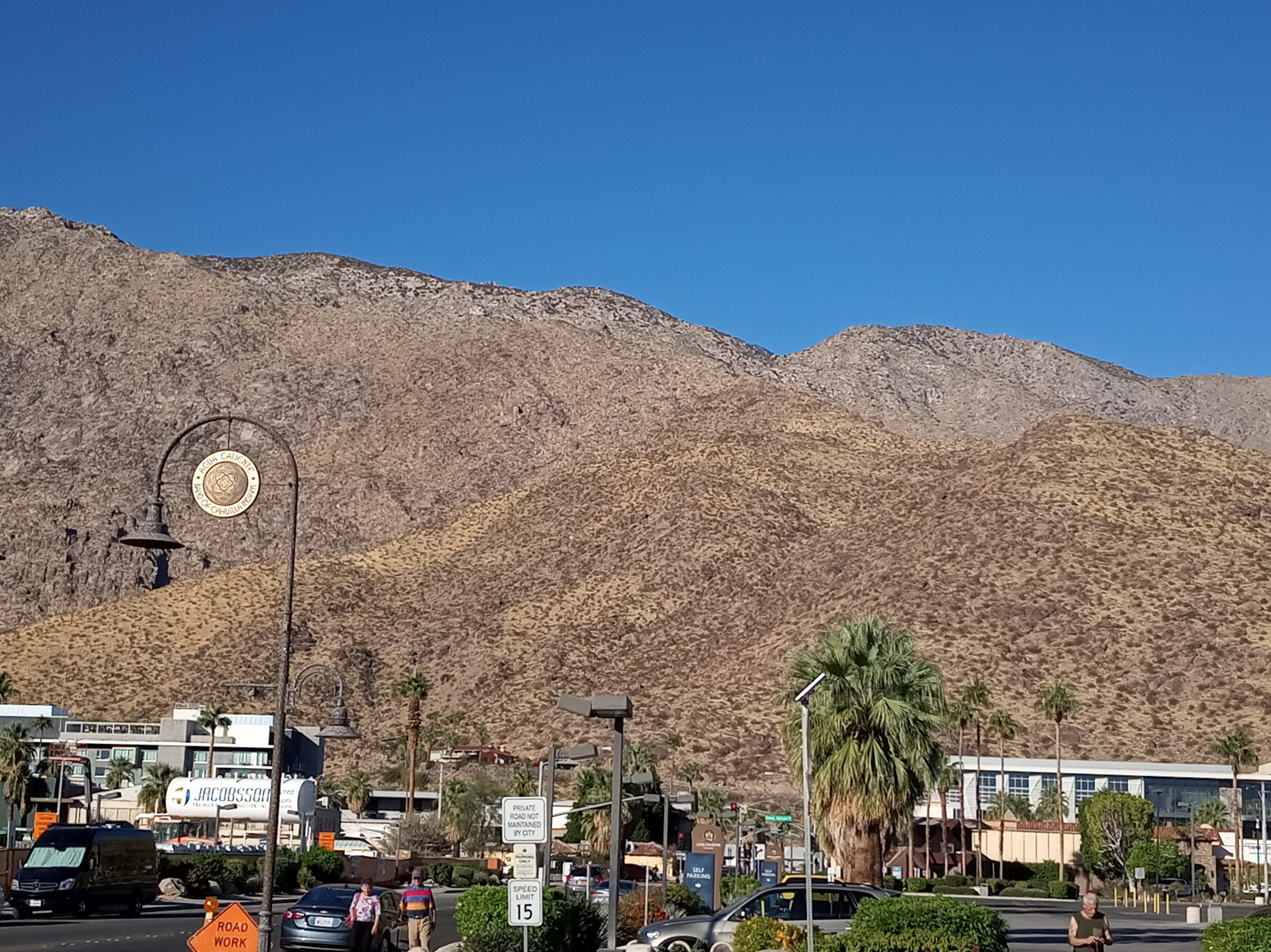
Agua Caliente Band signage in downtown Palm Springs

Location of Agua Caliente Reservation

The Agua Caliente Indian Reservation was founded on May 15, 1876 through Executive Order signed by President Ulysses S. Grant covering 31,610 acres (12,790 ha). In 1877 and 1907 the Reservation was extended, to cover 32,000 acres (13,000 ha) of land. The reservation was organized in a checkerboard pattern with tribal lands interspersed with non-tribal lands.

The executive orders of Ulysses S. Grant and Rutherford B. Hayes created the Tribe's Reservation on the even-numbered sections. The government allotted most of the Tribe's Reservation lands to tribal members. Many of the allottees sold or leased their lands to non-Indians, who now operate hotels, restaurants, golf courses, and other business establishments, or maintain residences on the allotted lands.

Since 6,700 acres (2,700 ha) of the reservation are in Palm Springs, California, the tribe is the city's largest collective landowner. The tribe owns Indian Canyons, located southwest of Palm Springs. The canyons are listed on the National Register of Historic Places. They also own land in the Santa Rosa and San Jacinto Mountains National Monument.

== Government ==
The tribe's headquarters is located in Palm Springs, California. They ratified their constitution and bylaws in 1957, gaining federal recognition. For many years, the band was led by Chairman Richard M. Milanovich until his death on March 11, 2012. Their current Tribal Council is as follows:

- Chair: Jeff L. Grubbe (elected 2026)
- Vice Chair: Anthony W. Purnel
- Secretary/Treasurer: Savana R. Saubel
- Member: Vincent Gonzales III
- Member: Moraino J. Patencio

On July 18, 2024, at a joint meeting between the Palm Springs City Council and the Agua Caliente Band of Cahuilla Indians Tribal Council, the tribe announced the establishment of the Agua Caliente Band of Cahuilla Indians Tribal Court, which was set to open in October. The court, located on reservation land in Palm Springs, was to have jurisdiction over civil, social, and family matters.

== Language ==
Agua Caliente is one of three reservations with speakers of the Pass dialect of the Cahuilla language. The other two are the Morongo Indian Reservation and Augustine Indian Reservation. Pass Cahuilla is a dialect of Cahuilla found within the Cupan branch of Takic languages, part of the Uto-Aztecan language family. Though revitalization efforts are underway, all dialects of Cahuilla are technically considered to be extinct as they are no longer spoken at home, and children are no longer learning them as a primary language. The last native speaker of Pass Cahuilla died in 2008.

== Programs and economic development ==
=== Tribal programs and family services ===
Tribal Family Services was established in 2003 to support social and educational programs for tribal members. Other services include cultural preservation, child development, and scholarships.

The Jane Augustine Patencio Cemetery provides burial services. (Palm Springs artist Carl Eytel is one of the few non-Indians buried in the cemetery.)

=== Agua Caliente Cultural Museum ===
The Agua Caliente Cultural Museum in Palm Springs was founded by the tribe in 1991. It houses permanent collections and archives, a research library, and changing exhibits, as well as hosting an annual film festival.

=== Spa resort and casinos ===
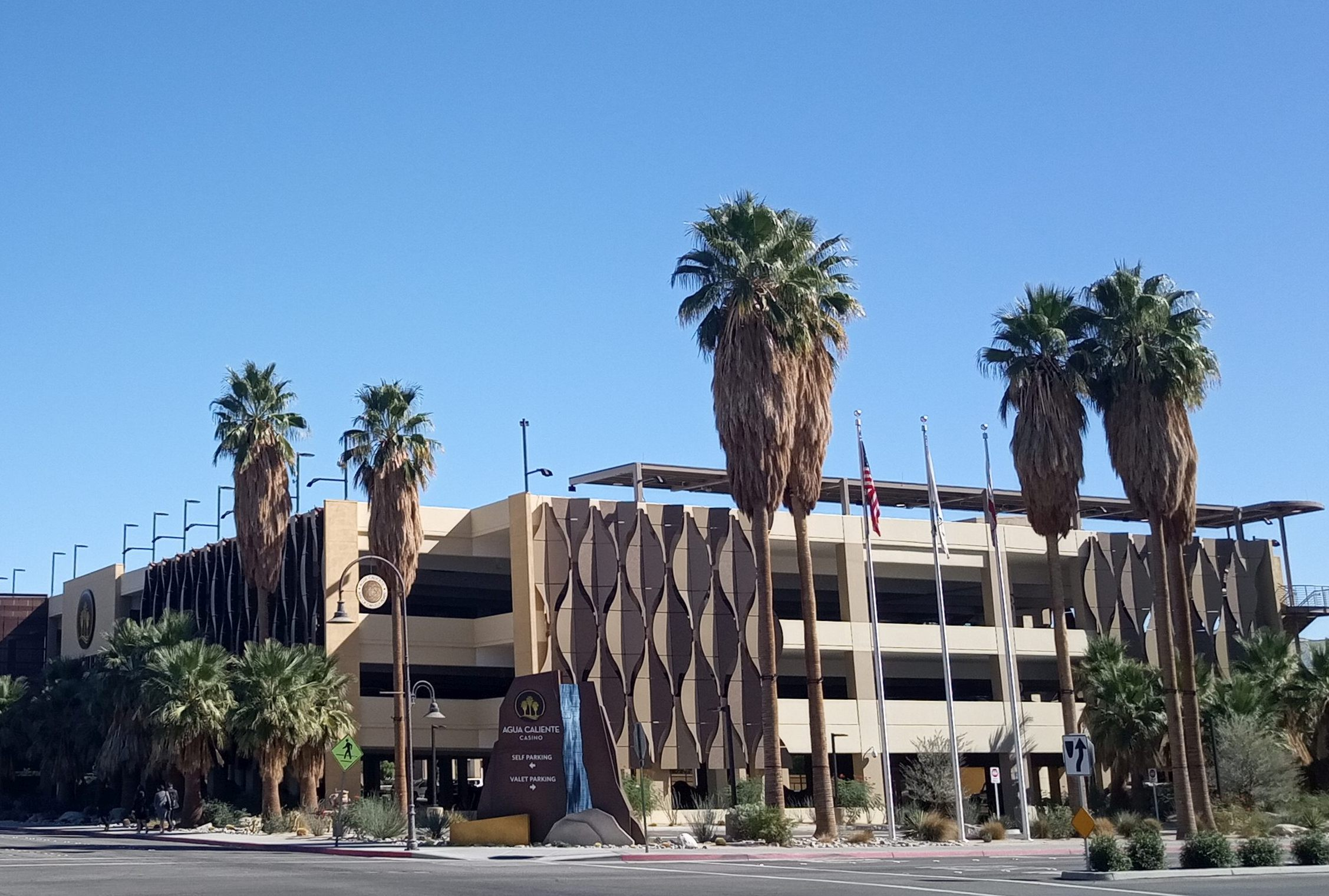
Image of Agua Caliente Casino parking garage in downtown Palm Springs

The tribe owns three major casinos. The first two are the Spa Resort Casino (now Agua Caliente Palm Springs) in downtown Palm Springs, California at the original hot springs and the Agua Caliente Casino Resort Spa in Rancho Mirage, California. The resort at Rancho Mirage also includes a hotel, fitness center and spa, the Canyons Lounge, and seven different restaurants. The Spa Resort Casino, opened in 2003, features gaming, the Cascade Lounge, and four restaurants. The hotel in Downtown Palm Springs closed in 2014.

Ground was broken on the third Agua Caliente casino on November 4, 2019. It is located in Cathedral City, California and opened on November 25, 2020. The tribe annexed 13 acres of land to build the casino. The tribe is the only one in California to own more than one casino.

=== Indian Canyons ===
Tahquitz Canyon southwest of downtown Palm Springs is accessible for hiking and guided tours. The Indian Canyons (consisting of Palm Canyon, Murray Canyon, and Andreas Canyon) also accessible for hiking, horseback riding, and tours, are south of Palm Springs.

=== Golf courses ===
The tribe also maintains two golf courses in Indian Canyon, which are open to the public.

=== Proposed downtown Palm Springs arena ===
In June 2019, it was announced that the tribe and entertainment company Oak View Group planned to build a privately funded arena on tribal land in downtown Palm Springs with the intent of the arena serving as the home ice for the expansion Seattle Kraken's American Hockey League affiliate. The arena was planned to begin construction in February 2020, but was suspended during the COVID-19 pandemic. By September 2020, OVG's negotiations with the tribe had come to a halt, and the agreement was ended. The Oak View Group chose to build their arena elsewhere.

== Notable tribal members ==
- Tribal leaders who have been honored with "Golden Palm Stars" on the Palm Springs Walk of Stars include:
  - Richard Milanovich, Chair of the Agua Caliente Band
  - Reid D. Milanovich, Chair & Vice Chair of the Agua Caliente Band
  - Flora Agnes Patencio, Cahuilla Indian elder
  - Ray Leonard Patencio, Cahuilla Indian leader
  - Peter Siva, Cahuilla Tribal Chair

== See also ==
- Mission Indians
- Golden Checkerboard, a book about legal issues related to the checkerboard-patterned division of Palm Springs real estate, wherein the tribe retains ownership of alternating "squares" of the region, including Palm Springs and surrounding cities.

== Bibliography ==
- Bean, Lowell John; Schafer, Jerry; Vane, Sylvia Brakke (1995). Archaeological, Ethnographic and Enthnohistoric Investigations at Tahquitz Canyon, Palm Springs, California. Menlo Park, California: Cultural Systems Research. OCLC 35045166.
- Eargle Jr., Dolan H. California Indian Country: The Land and the People. San Francisco: Tree Company Press, 1992. ISBN 0-937401-20-X.
- Pritzker, Barry M. A Native American Encyclopedia: History, Culture, and Peoples. Oxford: Oxford University Press, 2000. ISBN 978-0-19-513877-1.
