= Checkerboarding (land) =

Pattern of land grants and ownership

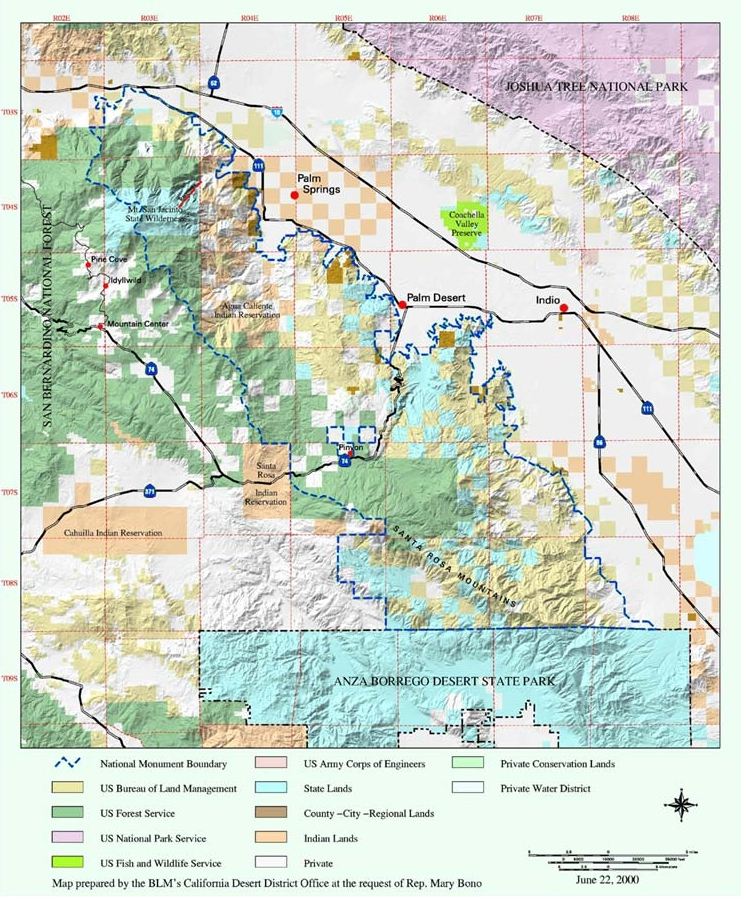
Map of the Santa Rosa and San Jacinto Mountains National Monument showing examples of checkerboarding

Checkerboarding refers to the intermingling of land ownership between two or more owners resulting in a checkerboard pattern. Checkerboarding is prevalent in the Western United States and Western Canada because of extensive use in railroad grants for western expansion, although it had its beginnings in the canal land grant era.

== Railroad grants ==
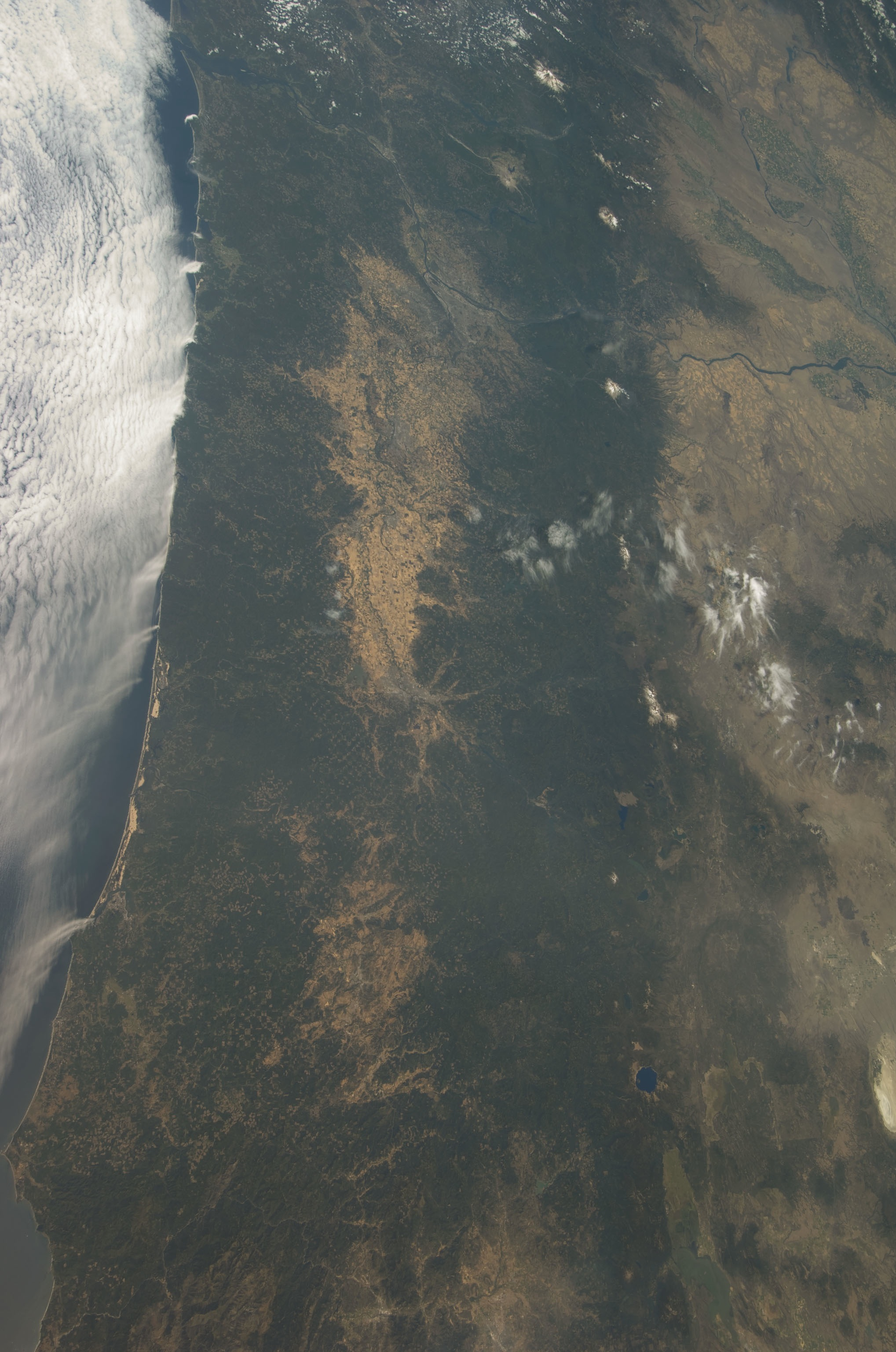
Historical checkerboarding visible on forests in Oregon (See enlarged image)

Checkerboarding in the West occurred as a result of railroad land grants where railroads would be granted every other section along a rail corridor. These grants, which typically extended 6 to 40 miles (10 to 64 km) from either side of the track, were a subsidy to the railroads. Unlike per-mile subsidies which encouraged fast but shoddy track-laying, land grants encouraged higher quality work, since the railroads could increase the value of the land by building better track. The government also benefited from the increased value of the remaining public parcels.

Railroad land grants split the land surrounding the area where train tracks were to be laid into a checkerboard pattern. The land was already divided into 640-acre numbered sections (260 ha) according to the Public Land Survey System; odd-numbered plots were given to private railroad companies, and the federal government kept even-numbered plots.

The federal government believed that because the value of land surrounding railroads would increase as much as twofold, granting land to private railroad companies would theoretically pay for itself and also increase the transportation infrastructure throughout the nation. The U.S. government was not able to sell much of the land that it retained because settlers willing to move West were not wealthy. The wealthiest United States citizens of the 19th century remained in the East. The federal government eventually gave away much of this land through the Homestead Acts.

The first grants were given to the Mobile and Ohio and Illinois Central Railroads in 1850. Additional grants were made under the Pacific Railway Acts between 1862 and 1871, when they were stopped because of public opposition. In total, 79 grants were made, totaling 200,000,000 acres (810,000 km^{2}), later reduced to 131,000,000 acres (530,000 km^{2}).

== Native American reservations ==
Checkerboarding also occurred with Native American land grants, where native land was intermingled with non-native land. Many Native American tribes opposed checkerboarding, because it broke up traditionally communal native settlements into many individual plots and allowed non-natives to claim land within those settlements.

The Dawes Act of 1887 created the most Native American checkerboarding. The act was intended to bolster self-sufficiency and systematically fracture native cultures, giving each individual between 40 and 160 acres (16 and 65 ha).

Native Americans were also negatively affected by federal government checkerboarding policies because railroad land grants were not prevented from running through land previously occupied by Native American tribes. This act of unrightful land transfer from the hands of Native Americans to private railroad companies and homestead grantees resulted in conflicts on more than one occasion. One notable location of conflict is the Chambers Checkerboard – a region occupied by Navajo people before railroad companies were granted the land to construct the transcontinental railroad. Tension grew between the Navajo tribe and the settlers of the region because of unexplained deaths, which each party blamed on the other. These tensions led to further violence after a white settler was suspected for murdering a Navajo youth without rightful punishment.

== Forest management ==
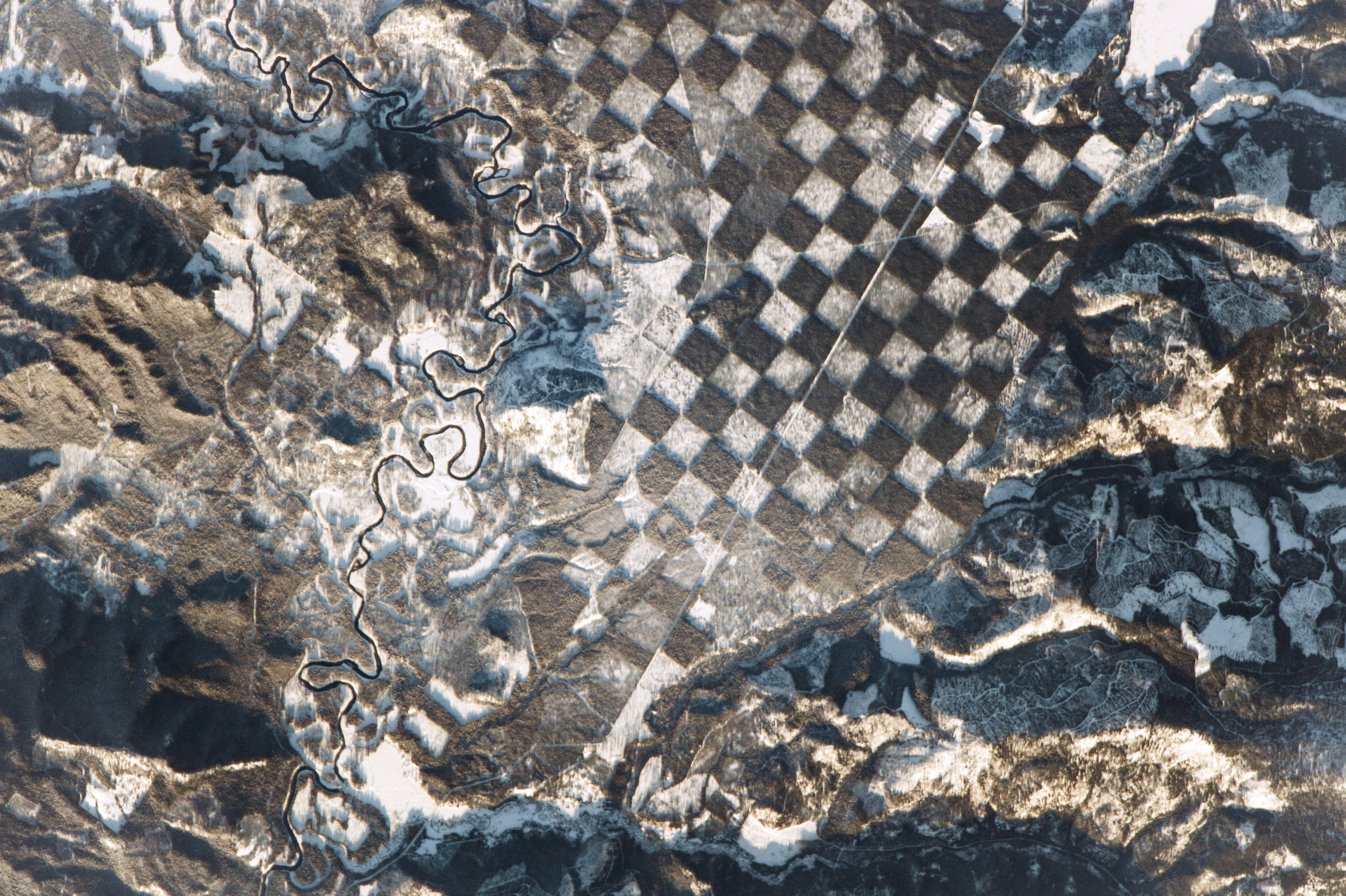
Checkerboard pattern alongside the Priest River in northern Idaho

Checkerboarding can create problems for access and ecological management. It is one of the major causes of inholdings within the boundaries of national forests. As is the case in northwestern California, checkerboarding has resulted in issues with managing national forest land. Checkerboarding was previously applied to these areas during the period of western expansion, and they are now commercial forest land. Conflicting policies establishing the rights of the private owners of this land have caused some difficulties in the local hardwood timber production economy.

While relieving this land from its checkerboard ownership structure could benefit the timber production economy of the region, checkerboards can allow government to extend good forestry practices over intermingled private lands, by demonstration or applying pressure via economy of scale or the right of access.

== Land access ==
Checkerboarding may make public land inaccessible when it is surrounded by privately owned land. In 2021, hunters in Wyoming were charged with trespassing on private land they never actually set foot on when they crossed between two parcels of public land at the corner where they touched. Landowners allege their airspace was violated. A jury found the hunters not guilty, but a civil lawsuit was also filed by the landowners.

== See also ==
- Alice's Meadow, a field in England sold in small plots to prevent motorway construction
- Dominion Land Survey (Canada)
- Gerrymandering
- Reservation diminishment
- Former Indian reservations
- Golden Checkerboard – book about the checkerboard Indian Reservation of the Agua Caliente Band of Cahuilla Indians in Palm Springs, California
- Eminent domain in the United States
