= Redick McKee =

American government official

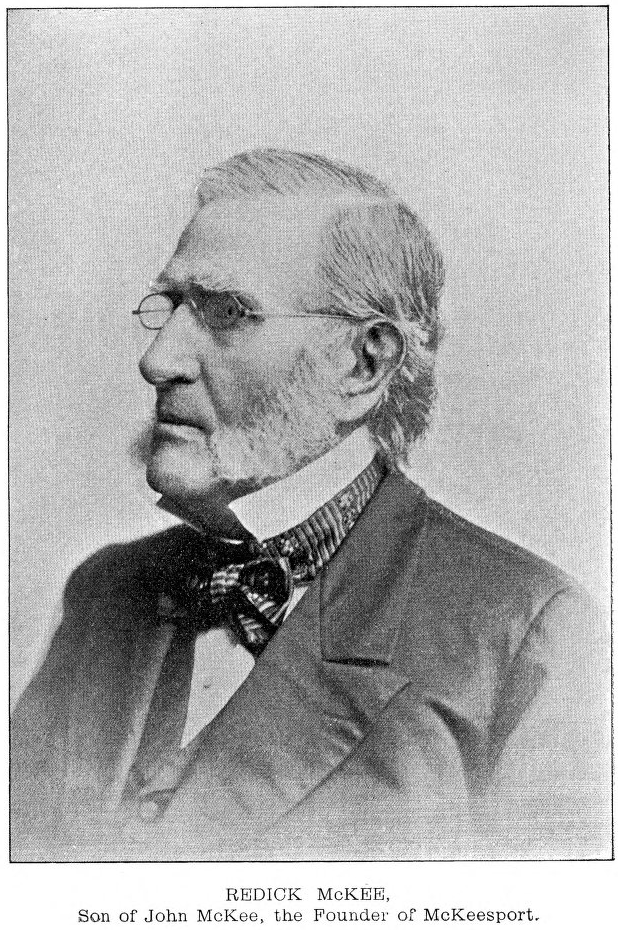
- Born: 7 December 1800; McKeesport, Pennsylvania
- Died: 13 September 1886 (aged 85); Washington, D.C.
- Occupation: United States Indian Agent
- Spouse: Eliza Ritchie
- Children: David R. McKee
- Parent(s): John McKee; Sally Redick

Redick McKee (7 December 1800 – 13 September 1886) was an American government official.

== Biography ==
Redick McKee was born in the town of McKeesport which was founded by his father. When McKee was five his father died. In the autumn of 1807 his family relocated to Pittsburgh. Throughout the following decade McKee worked on a relative's farm in Washington County and for merchants in Pittsburgh. At the age of 18 he joined the Presbyterian Church as a lay member. It was a momentous occasion for McKee who recorded later that:

"I seemed to live in a new world, and became desirous to serve a loving and compassionate Master."

He was given the opportunity to become a priest and receive an education in Canonsburg and later Princeton University but decided against it. While still 18 McKee was hired to manage a general goods store and a storage depot in Wheeling. He organized the first Sabbath school of Wheeling in November 1818. Students from various Protestant denominations were welcomed. At particular times there were upwards of 80 students in attendance.

=== Indian Agent ===
McKee joined a three-man commission created by the Federal Government in 1850 to draft treaties with California Natives. O. M. Wozencraft and George W. Barbour were appointed as well and began negotiations in 1851. However they collectively lacked expertise and familiarity with either California natives or how their societies utilized their territories. The Commissioners eventually divided California into three areas so they were largely operating independent of each other. McKee was assigned the task of creating treaties with natives of Northern California.

His party arrived on the Upper Klamath river in September 1851. There was a repeating cycle of violence and reprisals then ongoing in northern California. Local American militias were reported to be excessively violent in "revenging outrages" supposedly committed by natives. McKee and his associates toured the Shastan territories; inspecting the Shasta and Scott valleys in particular. They concluded that only the Scott could support a reservation and the agricultural work necessary to feed the Shasta. This assessment was due to the scarcity of agriculturally viable land in the Klamath Mountains. More promising areas did exist nearby but they were in Oregon.

The Shasta wanted to retain the entirety of Scott Valley for their designated reservation. American colonists from Scott Bar and Shasta Butte City contended for possession of the valley as well. Federal officials consulted with them for what they desired in a treaty with the Shasta. They called for the removal of all Shasta to a reservation placed on the headwaters of the Shasta River. The treaty terms drafted by McKee were not particularly favored by the Shasta or American settlers. The reservation was placed in Scott Valley, although the majority of the valley was to remain in colonist possession. The area specified in the treaty for the reservation was estimated by McKee to contain four or five square miles of arable land.The location of the Shasta reservation was apparently accepted, albeit grudgingly, by most American colonists of the area.

The treaties negotiated by McKee, Barbour, and Wozencraft amounted to eighteen. McKee pressed for the California legislature to accept the treaties. He argued the reservations were designed to allocate natives to keep portions of their traditional lands while keeping open the many areas bearing gold. The commissioners were stated to have always consulted with local American colonists and miners in establishing the borders of each reservation. Pointedly he went on to argue that unless if someone were to "propose a more humane and available system" the reservations had to be acknowledged by the California government. The state rejected all treaties and instructed its representatives in Washington, D.C., to lobby against them as well.

The treaties were endorsed by President Millard Fillmore, commissioner of Indian affairs Luke Lea and the recently appointed superintendent of Indian affairs for California Edward Fitzgerald Beale. The treaties were sent the Committee on Indian Affairs in June 1852. After a closed session the treaties were rejected. Ellison suggested that the vast amount of land set aside by the treaties and the expenditures allocated by the commissioners made the agreements unpopular in Congress. In total about 11,700 square miles (30,000 km^{2}) or about 7% of the total land area of California was to contain the eighteen reservations.

=== Later life ===
McKee died at Berkeley Springs, West Virginia, on 13 September 1886.
