= Deborah Parker =

American activist and Indigenous leader

- cicayalc̓aʔ (Note: Although commonly spelled "Tsi-Cy-Altsa", it is sometimes rendered in all lowercase as "tsi-cy-altsa" or also without hypens as "tsicyaltsa". Officially, Parker's name is spelled "cicayalc̓aʔ", as stated on her nameplate while serving as vice-chair of the Tulalip Tribes.)
- Born: 1970 (age 55–56)
- Citizenship: United States
- Education: University of Washington (B.A.) Spouse - divorced
- Known for: Activism
- Board member of: IWR (since 2017); Our Revolution (since 2016); NIWRC; NMAI (2014–2017); Tulalip Tribes (2012–2015); FEOP (2010–2013); C&C
- Children: 3

Deborah Parker (born 1970), also known by her native name cicayalc̓aʔ (sometimes spelled Tsi-Cy-Altsa or tsicyaltsa), is an activist and Indigenous leader in the United States. A member of the Tulalip Tribes of Washington, she served as its vice-chairwoman from 2012 to 2015 and is, as of July 2018, a board member for Our Revolution and the National Indigenous Women's Resource Center. She is also a co-founder of Indigenous Women Rise.

During the Violence Against Women Reauthorization Act of 2013, Parker successfully campaigned both for the reauthorization and for the inclusion of provisions which gave tribal courts jurisdiction over violent crimes against women and families involving non–Native Americans on tribal lands. She also served in the 2016 Democratic National Convention as one of the platform committee members representing Bernie Sanders, where she "helped to ensure that Native policy initiatives were ultimately rolled into the party's larger platform."

== Biography ==
Deborah Parker is a member of the Tulalip Tribes of Washington and is of Tulalip, Lummi, Yaqui, and Apache descent; her native name, cicayalc̓aʔ, extends back multiple generations on her mother's side. Her grandfather, who was of Lummi heritage, was from Cowichan Bay; her grandmother was from the Snohomish River area. Born in 1970 as the daughter of a Tulalip father and Yaqui–Apache mother, she grew up on the reservation, where she became intimately familiar with many of the problems facing the Native American community that she later sought to address. In 1999, she graduated from the University of Washington with a Bachelor of Arts in American ethnic studies and sociology. Since graduating, Parker has been involved in numerous groups and organizations. During her time at UW, she appeared as in extra in the movie, Singles.

Prior to working for the Tulalip Tribes, Parker served as the director of the residential healing school of the Tsleil-Waututh First Nation and participated in the Treaty Taskforce Office of the Lummi Nation, wherein she was mentored by indigenous leaders such as Billy Frank Jr., Joe DeLaCruz, Henry Cagey, and Jewell James. Later, she developed two programs for the Tulalip Tribes: Young Mothers, a culturally relevant initiative for teen mothers; and the Tribal Tobacco Program, which promoted responsible tobacco use among tribal members while acknowledging tobacco's sacred role among indigenous peoples in the United States. From 2005 to 2012, Parker served as the Legislative Policy Analyst in the Office of Governmental Affairs for the Tulalip Tribes; and, in March 2012, she began serving as vice-chairwoman of the Tulalip Tribes, becoming its only woman board member and its youngest member. After serving three terms as vice-chair, she decided to not seek re-election in 2015 to focus more on her family and activism.

While serving the Tulalip Tribes, Parker continued to involve herself in improving education and political engagement among Native Americans in Washington. In January 2005, she was elected as the treasurer for Choice & Consequence, a 501(c)(3) nonprofit organization that promotes healthy practices among Washington youth. She later was promoted to its board of directors as the president. In 2006, she participated in the development of Native Vote Washington, a 501(c)(4) organization that sought to encourage greater political participation among Native Americans. In 2007, Parker starred as Aunt Fran in Shadow of the Salmon, a docudrama about the significance of salmon among the Northwest Native peoples that was nominated for multiple awards. Later, in September 2010, she was appointed by the University of Washington's Friends of the Educational Opportunity Program as a member of its board of trustees, where she served her full three-year term.

In the same year as her 2013 efforts in support of passing the reauthorization of the Violence Against Women Act, Parker joined Mother Nation, then called Native Women in Need, as an honorary board member after eight months of supporting the group. She was initially drawn to the organization because of the work it did and the dedication of its founder. From 2014 to 2017, Parker served as a trustee board member for the Smithsonian Institution's National Museum of the American Indian. In October 2017, Parker was selected by Marysville School District to serve as its director of Equity, Diversity, and Indian Education and continues to do so as of June 2018.

Parker lives in Tulalip, Washington, where she is a mother to three children and two stepchildren was married to documentary filmmaker Myron Dewey (who is of Paiute and Shoshone descent) until his death in 2021.

As of July 2018, she is a board member for Our Revolution and the National Indigenous Women's Resource Center; the senior strategist for Pipestem Law, a lawfirm specializing in representing Native American interests; and the volunteer policy analyst for Mother Nation, a nonprofit organization supporting Native American women.

== Activism ==
Parker describes her activism and resilience to resist despite hardships as "warrior status". She has been the recipient of numerous awards relating to her activism and tribal outreach, including the Native Action Network's 2010 Enduring Spirit Award, the National Indian Education Association's 2011 Parent of the Year Award, the Daughters of the American Revolution's 2013 Community Service Award, Potlatch Fund's 2013 Pearl Capoeman-Baller Civic Participation Award, the Snohomish County Human Rights Commission's 2016 Human Rights Award, and KSER's 2017 Voice of the Community Award for Community Impact by an Individual. In September 2015, she was honored as the first of fifty in Indian Country Today's 50 Faces of Indian Country 2015. Parker was also the keynote speaker at the second annual Faith and Action Climate Team (FACT) Conference in October 2017.

=== 2012–13 Violence Against Women Act reauthorization ===
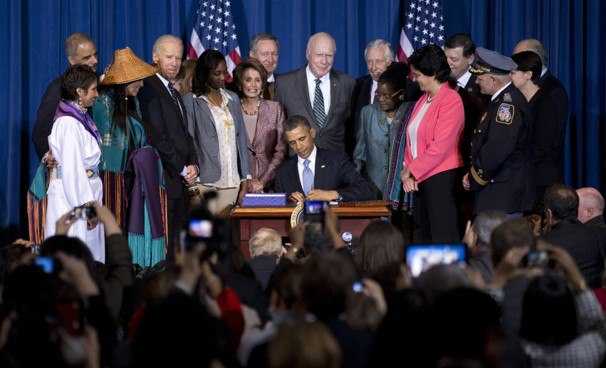
On March 7, 2013, Barack Obama signed the reauthorization act with Deborah Parker (left, with hat) by his side.

During the political battle leading up to the 2013 reauthorization of the Violence Against Women Act (VAWA), Parker was "vital" in the campaigning that pushed for reauthorization and her public testimony to Congress in particular was influential. While in Washington, D.C., for an April 2012 meeting with the Environmental Protection Agency, Parker visited the staff of Washington senator Patty Murray to discuss salmon and natural resource issues. During the visit, she learned about the efforts to pass the Violence Against Women Reauthorization Act of 2012 and the struggle that Murray's team were having with keeping support for a provision on tribal jurisdiction. According to the team, the reauthorization would likely fail, especially with the tribal provision, because the legislation "lacked a face." After being asked whether she knew any stories that could help the effort, Parker asked to speak directly with Murray. Murray was on the Senate floor at the time; she agreed to leave immediately to meet privately with Parker.

Parker and Murray met later that afternoon to discuss the reauthorization bill and the inclusion of new provisions to allow tribal courts to prosecute non–Native Americans for crimes against women and families on tribal lands. Parker, committed to ensuring that the VAWA was reauthorized with tribal provisions, decided that "she had to set aside her fear and become 'the face' and the voice for the issue of Native women and rape." This was not something she originally planned to do. The next day after the meeting, on April 25, she detailed in a press conference to Congress experiences both she and other women she knew had with violence and sexual abuse on reservations, describing herself as "a Native American statistic". It was the first time Parker had publicly talked about the experiences she had.

The Senate passed the VAWA reauthorization the following day with the protections for Native Americans included, though Republicans in the House of Representatives initially sought to remove them. Parker began to aggressively lobby in favor of the reauthorization and sought to convince members of Congress to support both it and its tribal provisions, so much so that then-president Obama got to know her by her native name and her "toes bled" from all the walking. She attended national cable news programs and provided interviews to newspapers across the country in support of the legislation. While lobbying the opponents of the bill, Parker felt she was "up against some of the worst discrimination I've ever seen in my entire life" and that Native American women were treated "like we were subhuman". The House of Representatives began proposing weaker language to the Senate in an attempt at compromise on the provision; Murray, Parker, and the rest refused. Before long, the opposition to the reauthorization and its tribal provisions eroded in the House and strong bipartisan support emerged.

By the time the final bill was signed into law in March 2013, it included the tribal law provisions that Parker promoted. Four months later, in July 2013, Parker was honored by the Obama White House as one of the Open Government and Civic Hacking Champions of Change "working to improve their communities through technology, innovation, and civic participation." For Murray, the VAWA reauthorization "would have never happened if Parker had not gone public with her story on Capitol Hill" and she "made the absolute difference at the absolute critical time" by "making her personal story become the face of what this was about". Around the same time, playwright Mary Kathryn Nagle released Sliver of a Full Moon, a play about the events surrounding the VAWA reauthorization that tells the stories of five Native American women and two Native men. Among the five women is Deborah Parker, played by Jennifer Bobiwash.

Later, in October 2015, the tribal provisions were officially implemented for all tribes after a "very successful" pilot program involving the Tulalip, Pascua Yaqui, and Umatilla tribes. A year afterward, in October 2016, Parker was featured in the second campaign advertisement of Patty Murray's re-election in the 2016 United States Senate election in Washington. In the video, Parker briefly recounted her experiences with sexual assault and her work with Murray to help pass the VAWA reauthorization.

=== 2016 US presidential election ===
During the 2016 Democratic National Convention, Parker served as one of the platform committee members representing Bernie Sanders after having been an early and vocal supporter of his 2016 presidential campaign. She was initially hesitant to do so, but accepted then–Democratic National Committee chairwoman Debbie Wasserman Schultz's offer to join the platform committee, seeing it as an opportunity to advance the causes she supported, particularly "Native American sovereignty, climate justice, to increase [...] protections for women, [and] income inequality"; and to "'honor' Sanders and 'represent his vision' on the committee." As a platform committee member, Parker "helped to ensure that Native policy initiatives were ultimately rolled into the party's larger platform." She also authored one of the twelve "priority amendments" to the Democratic platform that the Sanders campaign supported, which sought to introduce language that explicitly promoted using global warming as a "test" for whether any policy or decision should be supported within relevant federal agencies.

In June 2016, on the first day of the platform drafting hearing in St. Louis, Parker proposed a substitution amendment that replaced and strengthened the language in the section on honoring tribal nations. Elijah Cummings, the chairman presiding over the hearing, allotted Parker additional time and gave her the floor. While reading the amendment text, she was overwhelmed by the moment and began to cry. After some silence, James Zogby continued where Parker left off until she regained her composure and resumed. Barbara Lee noted afterward that in all her decades of attending Democratic National Conventions, she did not recall "any provision or plank in our platform that acknowledges the first people of the United States". Cornel West likewise commented that Parker's "very existence [...] on this committee is historically unprecedented". After further commendations from other committee members, and Cummings' recognition of Parker's "passion", the proposal was passed unanimously to a standing ovation.

Specifically, the amendment text committed the Democratic Party to "uphold, honor, and strengthen to the highest extent possible the United States' fundamental trust and responsibility, grounded in the Constitution and treaties, to American Indian and Alaska Native tribes" because "throughout our history we have failed to live up to that trust". It also committed the party to restoring tribal lands to indigenous tribes; increasing funding and support for tribal communities, particularly in infrastructure, education, and health care; eliminating school and sports mascots that are derogatory, stereotyping, or racist toward Native Americans; and improving both tribal jurisdiction and indigenous voting rights. Lastly, the amendment endorsed "environmental justice in Indian Country" and acknowledged "the past injustices and the misguided, harmful federal and state policies and actions based on outdated and discredited values and beliefs that resulted in the destruction of the Indian nations' economies, social, and religious systems, the taking of their lands, and the creation of intergenerational trauma that exists to this day." The amendment text was fully retained in the July 1 draft version and further expanded to strengthen language for Native Hawaiians by the time the official platform was released on July 21.

Shortly after Our Revolution formed in August 2016, Parker joined it as a member of its board of directors.

=== Protests ===
Throughout the years, Parker has opposed and protested multiple pipeline projects out of concern for their environmental impact and effects on tribal lands. In September 2016, Parker and other Tulalip tribal members joined Standing Rock in protesting the Dakota Access Pipeline. A month later, on November 15, 2016, Parker joined Eryn Wise, LaDonna Brave Bull Allard, and Judith LeBlanc for the protests' "National Day of Action", during which the four staged a sit-in at the Army Corps of Engineers headquarters and led a crowd of approximately 1,000 protestors around Washington, D.C.

Parker joined other indigenous leaders and groups in January 2017 for the 2017 Women's March and marched in the Women's March on Washington. During the protest, a new group was formed called Indigenous Women Rise, of which she became a co-founder. A year later, in January 2018, she participated in the 2018 Women's March in Seattle, where she recounted the previous year's events.

In an April 2018 article, Parker criticized Canadian prime minister Justin Trudeau and advocated for opposition to the Trans Mountain Pipeline in solidarity with First Nations peoples. Our Revolution released a statement doing likewise on the same day.

== Views ==
During a 2016 interview, Parker described a national restriction on gun possession for those previously charged with domestic violence as a "necessity" for protecting women. She also censured Donald Trump's usage of "Pocahontas" as a nickname for Elizabeth Warren (who claims Cherokee and Delaware heritage), which she described as "very insulting"; and Trump's past treatment of tribal nations and their sovereignty more generally.

Parker is critical of the US government's current and historic treatment of indigenous populations, comparing Native American reservations to "concentration camps".

Regarding the traditional knowledge of indigenous peoples, especially traditional ecological knowledge and traditional medicine, Parker supports rules and guidelines which preserve indigenous ways of life and respect the privacy of certain traditions and practices. She also emphasizes the importance of viewing indigenous knowledge from an indigenous perspective, which may differ from "the Western-science approach" to these issues.

== See also ==
- History of Native Americans in the United States
- List of Native American politicians
- Native American civil rights
- Native American feminism
- Native American reservation politics
- Native American women in politics
- Sexual victimization of Native American women
- Violence against women in the United States
