= Worcester v. Georgia =

- Supreme Court of the United States

Argued February 20, 1832 Decided March 3, 1832
- Full case name: Samuel A. Worcester v. State of Georgia
- Citations: 31 U.S. 515 (more) 6 Pet. 515; 8 L. Ed. 483

Case history
- Prior: Plaintiff convicted in Gwinnett County, Georgia by the Georgia Superior Court (September 15, 1831)
- Subsequent: None

Holding
- Worcester's conviction is void because states have no criminal jurisdiction in Indian Country.

Court membership
- Chief Justice John Marshall Associate Justices William Johnson · Gabriel Duvall; Joseph Story · Smith Thompson; John McLean · Henry Baldwin

Case opinions
- Majority: Marshall, joined by Johnson, Duvall, Story, Thompson
- Concurrence: McLean
- Dissent: Baldwin

Laws applied
- U.S. Const. art. I

Worcester v. Georgia, 31 U.S. (6 Pet.) 515 (1832), is a landmark case in which the United States Supreme Court vacated the conviction of Samuel Worcester and held that the Georgia criminal statute that prohibited non-Native Americans from being present on Native American lands without a license from the state was unconstitutional. While the state law was an effort to restrict white settlement on Cherokee territory, Worcester reasoned that obeying the law would, in effect, be surrendering the sovereignty of the Cherokee Nation to manage their own territory. The opinion is most famous for its dicta, which laid out the relationship between tribes, state, and federal governments. It is considered to have built the foundations of the doctrine of tribal sovereignty in the United States.

== Background ==
Samuel Austin Worcester was a missionary to the Cherokee, translator of the Bible, printer, and defender of the Cherokee's sovereignty. He collaborated with Elias Boudinot in the American Southeast to establish the Cherokee Phoenix, the first Native American newspaper.

During this period, the westward push of European-American settlers was continually encroaching on Cherokee territory, even after they had made some land cessions to the US government. With the help of Worcester and his sponsor, the American Board of missionaries made a plan to fight the encroachment by using the courts. They wanted to take a case to the U.S. Supreme Court to define the relationship between the federal and state governments, and establish the sovereignty of the Cherokee nation.

Hiring William Wirt, a former U.S. Attorney General, the Cherokee argued their position before the U.S. Supreme Court in Georgia v. Tassel. The court granted a writ of error for a Cherokee convicted in a Georgia court for a murder occurring in Cherokee territory, though the state refused to accept the writ.

In 1831, Cherokee Nation v. Georgia case was dismissed by the court on technical grounds for lack of jurisdiction. In the latter's majority opinion, Chief Justice Marshall described the Cherokee Nation as a "domestic dependent nation" with no rights binding on a state.

Worcester and eleven other missionaries met and published a resolution in protest of an 1830 Georgia law prohibiting all white men from living on Native American land without a state license. Once the law had taken effect, Governor George Rockingham Gilmer ordered the militia to arrest Worcester and the others who signed the document and refused to get a license.

After two series of trials, all eleven men were convicted and sentenced to four years of hard labor at the state penitentiary in Milledgeville. Nine accepted pardons, but Worcester and Elizur Butler declined their pardons, so the Cherokee could take the case to the Supreme Court. William Wirt argued the case, but Georgia refused to have a legal counsel represent it, because the state believed the Supreme Court did not have authority to hear the case.

== Decision ==
Chief Justice John Marshall laid out in this opinion that the relationship between the Indian Nations and the United States is that of nations, consistent with the principles of the law of nations. He reasoned that the United States, in the character of the federal government, inherited the legal rights of The Crown. Those rights, he stated, included the sole right to negotiate with the Indian nations of North America, to the exclusion of all other European powers. This did not include the rights of possession to their land or political dominion over their laws. He acknowledged that the exercise of conquest and purchase can give political dominion, but those are in the hands of the federal government, and individual states had no authority in American Indian affairs. Georgia's statute was therefore invalid.

Associate Justice Henry Baldwin dissented, stating that, in his opinion, the record was not properly returned upon the writ of error, and ought to have been returned by the State court of Georgia, and not by the clerk of the Court of Gwinnett County. As to the merits, he said that his opinion remained the same as was expressed by him in the case of the Cherokee Nation v. Georgia in 1831.

Marshall's language in Worcester may have been motivated by his regret that his earlier opinions in Fletcher v. Peck and Johnson v. McIntosh had been used as a justification for Georgia's actions. Joseph Story considered it similarly, writing in a letter to his wife dated March 4, 1832: "Thanks be to God, the Court can wash their hands clean of the iniquity of oppressing the Indians and disregarding their rights."

== Enforcement ==
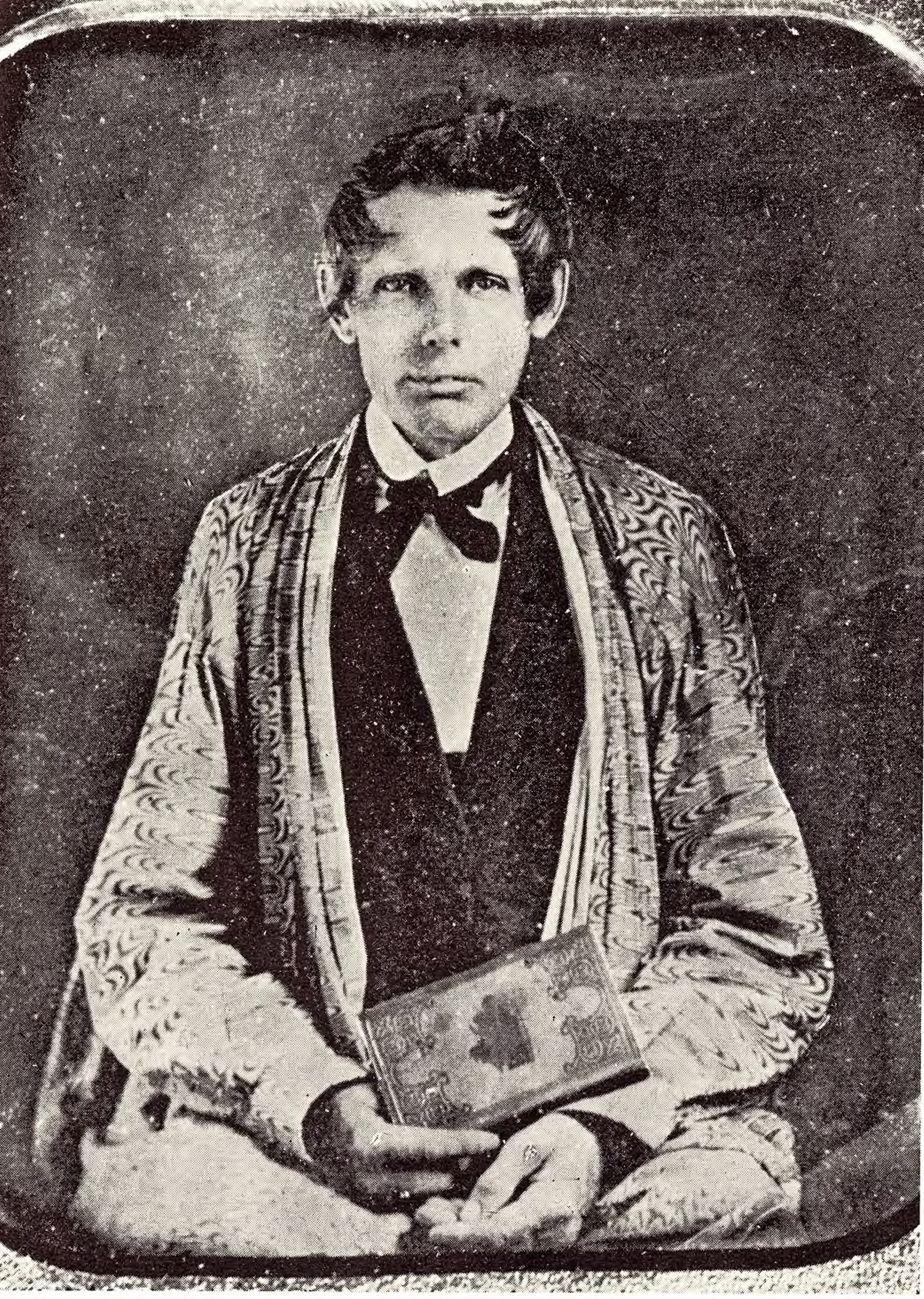
Samuel Worcester

In a popular quotation that is believed to be apocryphal, President Andrew Jackson reportedly responded: "John Marshall has made his decision; now let him enforce it!" This quotation first appeared twenty years after Jackson's death in newspaper publisher Horace Greeley's 1864 history of the U.S. Civil War, The American Conflict. It was reported in the press in March 1832 that Jackson was unlikely to aid in carrying out the court's decision if his assistance were to be requested. In an April 1832 letter to John Coffee, Jackson wrote that "the decision of the Supreme Court has fell still born, and they find that they cannot coerce Georgia to yield to its mandate." In a letter in March 1832, Virginia politician David Campbell reported a private conversation in which Jackson had "sportively" suggested calling on the Massachusetts state militia to enforce the order if the Supreme Court requested he intervene, because Jackson believed Northern partisans had brought about the court's ruling.

The Court did not ask federal marshals to carry out the decision. Worcester thus imposed no obligations on Jackson; there was nothing for him to enforce, although Jackson's political enemies conspired to find evidence, to be used in the forthcoming political election, to claim that he would refuse to enforce the Worcester decision. Under the Judiciary Act of 1789, Supreme Court cases were to be remanded back down to the lower court for final execution of the Supreme Court's judgment. The Supreme Court could only execute the final judgment in cases where the lower court failed to act on the Supreme Court's directive. Shortly after the Supreme Court's ruling had been issued in March 1832, the court recessed for the term, and would not convene again for the following term until January 1833.

The Supreme Court's March 3, 1832, ruling ordered that Samuel Worcester and Elizur Butler be freed from prison. On March 17, Worcester's lawyers petitioned the Georgia court to release Worcester, but the court refused. Over the following months, Worcester's lawyers petitioned the newly elected governor of Georgia, Wilson Lumpkin, to offer an unconditional pardon, but Lumpkin declined on the basis that the federal government was overstepping its authority. At the same time, the federal government, under Secretary of War Lewis Cass, began an intensive campaign to secure a removal treaty with the Cherokee nation, which would render the Supreme Court decision and Worcester's continued political imprisonment inconsequential. On November 6, Lumpkin delivered his annual message to the Georgia state legislature, announcing he would continue to resist the Supreme Court's decision:

"The Supreme Court of the United States . . . have, by their decision, attempted to overthrow the essential jurisdiction of the State, in criminal cases . . . I have, however, been prepared to meet this usurpation of Federal power with the most prompt and determined resistance."

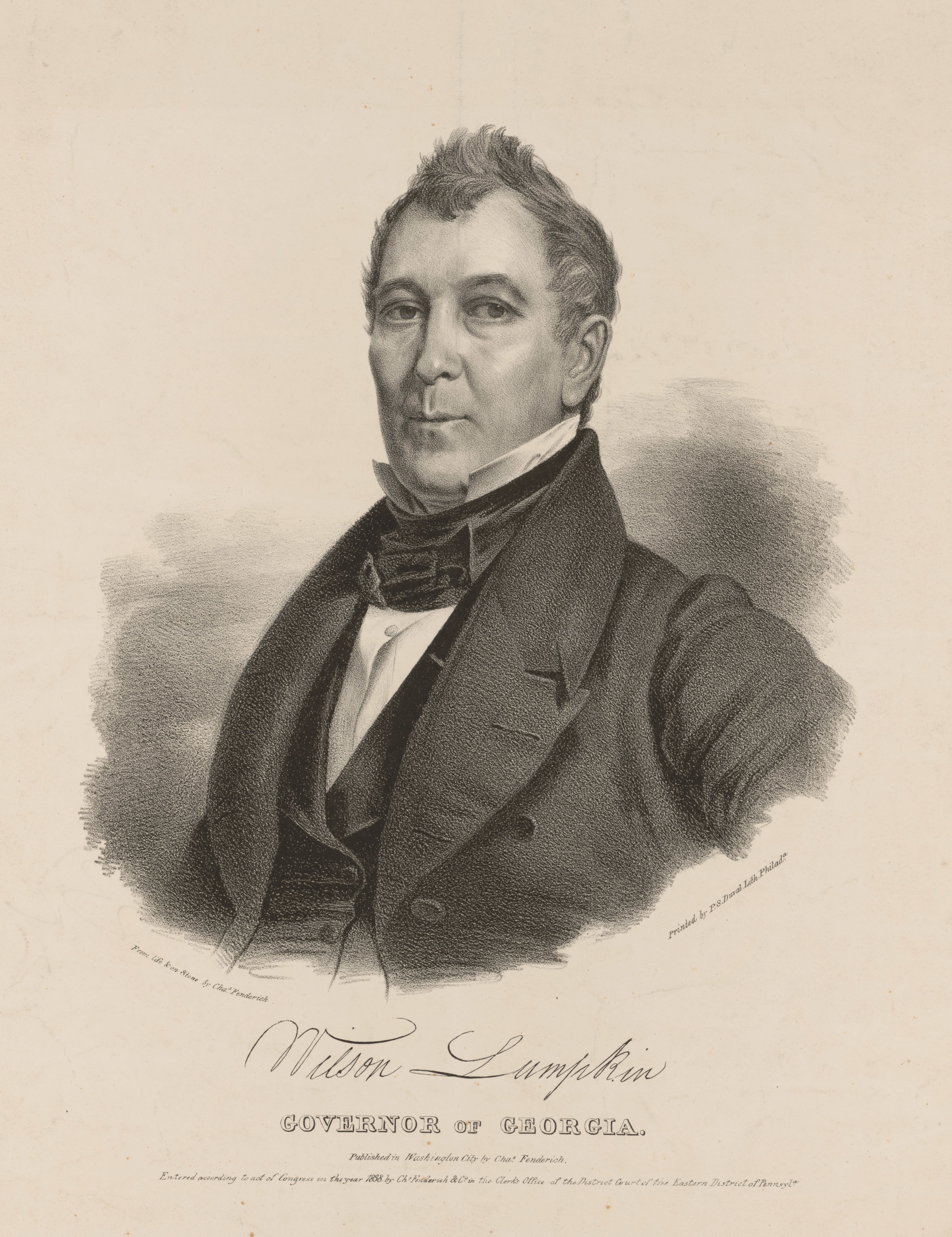
Wilson Lumpkin, Governor of Georgia, 1831–35

Eighteen days later, on November 24, the state of South Carolina issued an Ordinance of Nullification, a separate and unrelated attempt by a state to defy federal authority. This began a series of events known as the Nullification Crisis. In an effort to isolate Georgia from South Carolina, the Jackson administration changed course in their approach to the Worcester decision. Secretary of War Lewis Cass, U.S. Senator John Forsyth of Georgia, incoming Vice President Martin Van Buren, and Van Buren's political allies of the Albany Regency began to lobby Lumpkin to offer a pardon, citing the probability that a removal treaty with the Cherokees could be achieved once Worcester and Butler were released from prison. To sustain his states' rights position, Lumpkin stipulated that Worcester and Butler had to petition for the pardon with an admission they had violated state law. The two missionaries at first refused, because the Supreme Court decision had ruled they had not broken any law. The two decided to continue their appeal once the Supreme Court convened in early 1833.

The national situation began to deteriorate in December. On December 8, Andrew Jackson issued a Nullification Proclamation, denouncing nullification in South Carolina, declaring secession to be unconstitutional, and proclaiming the United States government would resort to force if South Carolina did not back down. Further entreaties by Georgia politicians and representatives of the federal government convinced Worcester and Butler of the risk to the Cherokee nation if Georgia were to join South Carolina's attempt at secession. Worcester and Butler began to reconsider their appeal to the Supreme Court.

On December 22, Georgia repealed the law under which Worcester and Butler were imprisoned, allowing them to petition for a pardon without having to take an oath to leave the state of Georgia or Cherokee land. On January 8, 1833, the missionaries petitioned for their pardon, but it did not contain an admission they had broken state law, and Lumpkin believed its wording was insulting to the state of Georgia. Representatives for both sides negotiated for a new letter to be drafted by the missionaries, which was delivered to Lumpkin the following day. In the final letter, Worcester and Butler appealed to the "magnanimity of the State" of Georgia to end their prison sentences. On January 14, Lumpkin issued a general proclamation, not a formal pardon. Worcester and Butler were freed from prison.

Two days later, on January 16, President Andrew Jackson sent a message to Congress requesting the military power to put down the South Carolina insurrection. This request would be granted in the form of the Force Bill. Worcester and Butler were criticized by supporters of the Nullification effort, accusing them of aiding Jackson's effort to inaugurate war against South Carolina.

On January 19, Worcester and Butler arrived back at New Echota, the capital of the Cherokee Nation. In February, they sent a letter to the Missionary Herald, explaining that their abandonment of the Supreme Court case was "not . . . from any change in our views, but on account of changing circumstances".

== Aftermath ==
On December 29, 1835, a few members of the Cherokee nation, with no official status or authorization, signed the controversial removal treaty, the Treaty of New Echota, which was immediately protested by the large majority of the Cherokees. Samuel Worcester moved to the Cherokee nation's western Indian Territory in 1836, after removal had commenced. Worcester resumed his ministry, continued translating the Bible into Cherokee, and established the first printing press in that part of the United States, working with the Cherokee to publish their newspaper.

In his Pulitzer Prize-winning book The Supreme Court in United States History, Charles Warren asserted that the sequence of events in the aftermath of the Worcester case allowed the Supreme Court to go from its lowest point in history in late 1832, to its strongest position in fifteen years by early 1833. In 2000, Justice Stephen Breyer observed that the Supreme Court was an "obvious winner" in the case once its judgment was enforced, but the Cherokee nation was the "obvious loser" since the judgment did not benefit them in any way. Because Jackson proceeded with Cherokee removal, Worcester did not aid indigenous rights at the time. Removal of the Cherokee nation would begin just three years after Samuel Worcester and Elizur Butler were released from Georgia prison, and forced migration would commence via the Trail of Tears in 1838.

Worcester has been cited in several later opinions on the subject of tribal sovereignty in the United States. In 2022, the Court ruled on Oklahoma v. Castro-Huerta, a case that resulted from the Court's earlier decision in McGirt v. Oklahoma (2020) that the tribal lands in the eastern half of Oklahoma had never been disestablished by Congress, and as a result, crimes committed on tribal lands by Native Americans were considered to be covered by tribal and federal jurisdiction rather than the state. Castro-Huertra was decided to clarify that crimes committed by non-Native Americans on tribal lands would have simultaneous jurisdiction by both federal and state. Justice Brett Kavanaugh, writing the majority in Castro-Huetra, stated that "the Worcester-era understanding of Indian country as separate from the State was abandoned later in the 1800s", based on both United States v. McBratney and Draper v. United States.

== In popular culture ==
The 2018 play Sovereignty by Mary Kathryn Nagle portrays the historic circumstances surrounding the case.
