= Black Beaver =

American trapper (1806–1880)

- Se-ket-tu-may-qua
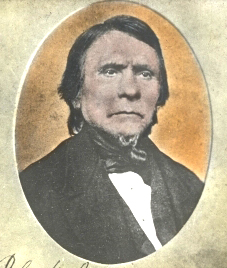

Lenape leader

Personal details
- Born: c. 1806 Indiana Territory (near present-day Belleville, Illinois)
- Died: 1880 Anadarko, Indian Territory
- Resting place: Fort Sill, Oklahoma
- Spouse: Seven wives
- Children: Four daughters, two sons
- Education: tribal
- Known for: Establishing the California and Chisholm trails; rancher and wealthiest Lenape in America

Black Beaver or Se-ket-tu-may-qua (c. 1806–1880) was a Lenape trapper and interpreter who worked for the American Fur Company. He served as a scout and guide as he was fluent in English, as well as several European and Native American languages. He is credited with establishing the California and Chisholm trails.

After working as a scout, he settled among his people in the village of Beaverstown in Indian Territory, where they had been relocated in the 1830s.

At the beginning of the American Civil War, he guided hundreds of Union troops and their long wagon train from Fort Arbuckle in Indian Territory to Kansas, to escape much larger Confederate forces. They had to travel more than 500 miles through Indian Territory to reach safety. None of the party or their animals or wagons was lost. Confederates destroyed Black Beaver's ranch, but after the war, he eventually resettled in Indian Territory. He became a wealthy rancher in present-day Anadarko, Oklahoma. His former ranch site has been listed on the National Register of Historic Places.

== Trapper and guide ==
Black Beaver was born in 1806 into a Lenape family living in the area of present-day Belleville, western Illinois. This was east of St. Louis on the east bank of the Mississippi River. Many Lenape had migrated here after the American Revolutionary War from their traditional territory along the Delaware River and coastal areas of the mid-Atlantic states. As a youth, Black Beaver began trapping and trading beaver pelts for the American Fur Company of John Jacob Astor, as the fur trade was still an important industry.

== Interpreter and scout ==
Known to his own people as Se-ket-tu-may-qua, the young man became fluent in English, French, and Spanish, in addition to his native Lenape and about eight other American Indian languages. He used the common trade sign language to communicate with tribes whose language he did not know. His skills were invaluable to the many white settlers and military expeditions that were traveling west. He served the Dodge-Leavenworth Expedition of 1834 and, during the Mexican–American War (1846–1848), led a unit of Indian volunteers as a captain in the U.S. Army.

When Captain Randolph B. Marcy escorted the first 500 emigrants from Fort Smith, Arkansas to Santa Fe during the gold rush days of 1849, he engaged Black Beaver as his guide. On his return, Black Beaver took a shortcut across the prairie that reduced the two-month trip to two weeks. Thousands of emigrants followed this route to the west; it became known as the California Trail.

After that Black Beaver settled near Fort Arbuckle, in south-central Indian Territory. He became chief of a Lenape village called Beaverstown. During 1849, 1852 and 1854, Black Beaver guided Randolph B. Marcy's exploration expeditions throughout Texas.

In his 1859 guide book The Prairie Traveler, Marcy wrote that Black Beaver

had visited nearly every point of interest within the limits of our unsettled territory. He had set his traps and spread his blanket upon the head waters of the Missouri and Columbia; and his wanderings had led him south to the Colorado and Gila, and thence to the shores of the Pacific in Southern California. His life had been that of a veritable cosmopolite, filled with scenes of intense and startling interest, bold and reckless adventure. He was with me two seasons in the capacity of guide, and I always found him perfectly reliable, brave, and competent. His reputation as a resolute, determined, and fearless warrior did not admit of question, yet I have never seen a man who wore his laurels with less vanity. The truth is my friend Beaver was one of those few heroes who never sounded his own trumpet; yet no one that knows him ever presumed to question his courage.

By 1860 Black Beaver was the wealthiest and most well-known Lenape in America. He had settled in present-day Caddo County, Oklahoma and lived at Anadarko. The Lenape had been relocated here from east of the Mississippi by the federal government during Indian Removal .

In May 1861, with the outbreak of the American Civil War, General William H. Emory, stationed at Fort Arbuckle, learned that 6,000 Confederate troops were advancing toward his forces from Texas and Arkansas. He gathered the soldiers from forts Washita, Cobb and Arbuckle near Minco, but to escape to Kansas across the open prairie he needed a guide. Other Indian guides turned him down for fear of reprisal by the Confederates. In addition, members of the "Five Civilized Tribes": the Cherokee, Chickasaw, Creek and other slaveholding tribes, had allied with the Confederates, who promised them an Indian state if they won the war.

Emory guaranteed Black Beaver that the federal government would reimburse him for any losses, so he agreed to help. He scouted the approaching Confederate troops and provided information for Emory to capture their advance guard, who were the first prisoners captured during the Civil War. Black Beaver guided more than 800 Union soldiers, their prisoners, and 200 teamsters managing 80 wagons and 600 horses and mules in a mile-long train across 500 miles of open prairie to safety at Fort Leavenworth in eastern Kansas; he did not lose a single man, horse or wagon. He also freed multiple slaves from each of the Five Civilized Tribes.

The Confederate Army and allied Native American warriors destroyed Black Beaver’s ranch and placed a bounty on his head. He stayed in Kansas until after the end of the war, when he returned to rebuild in Indian Territory. The United States government never fully compensated him for his losses.

== Rancher ==
After the war, Black Beaver and his friend Jesse Chisholm returned and developed part of the Native American path used by the Union Army into what became known as the Chisholm Trail. They collected and herded thousands of stray Texas longhorn cattle by the Trail to railheads in Kansas, from where the cattle were shipped East, where beef sold for ten times the price in the West. The Chisholm Trail was used by other cowboys to drive millions of cattle to Kansas for shipment to the East.

Black Beaver resettled at Anadarko, where he built the first brick home in the area. He had 300 acres of fenced and cultivated land as well as cattle, hogs and horses.

== Death and legacy ==
Black Beaver died at his home on May 8, 1880, and was buried on his ranch. In 1976 he was reinterred in a military cemetery at Fort Sill, in recognition of his contributions to the Union during the Civil War. His former ranch site has been listed on the National Register of Historic Places. From 1876 until his death, he was a Baptist.

Black Beaver was the first inductee in the American Indian Hall of Fame, located in Anadarko on part of his former ranch lands.

Se-ket-tu-may-qua is the name of a character in Mary Kathryn Nagle's play, Manahatta. His image was used in the set of the Yale Repertory Theater production of the show. A fictionalized depiction of Black Beaver appears in the 2021 edition of the educational game The Oregon Trail, where he is shown at various stages of his life, offering advice and history lessons to the player.
