= Church Center for the United Nations =

Interfaith space at the United Nations Headquarters

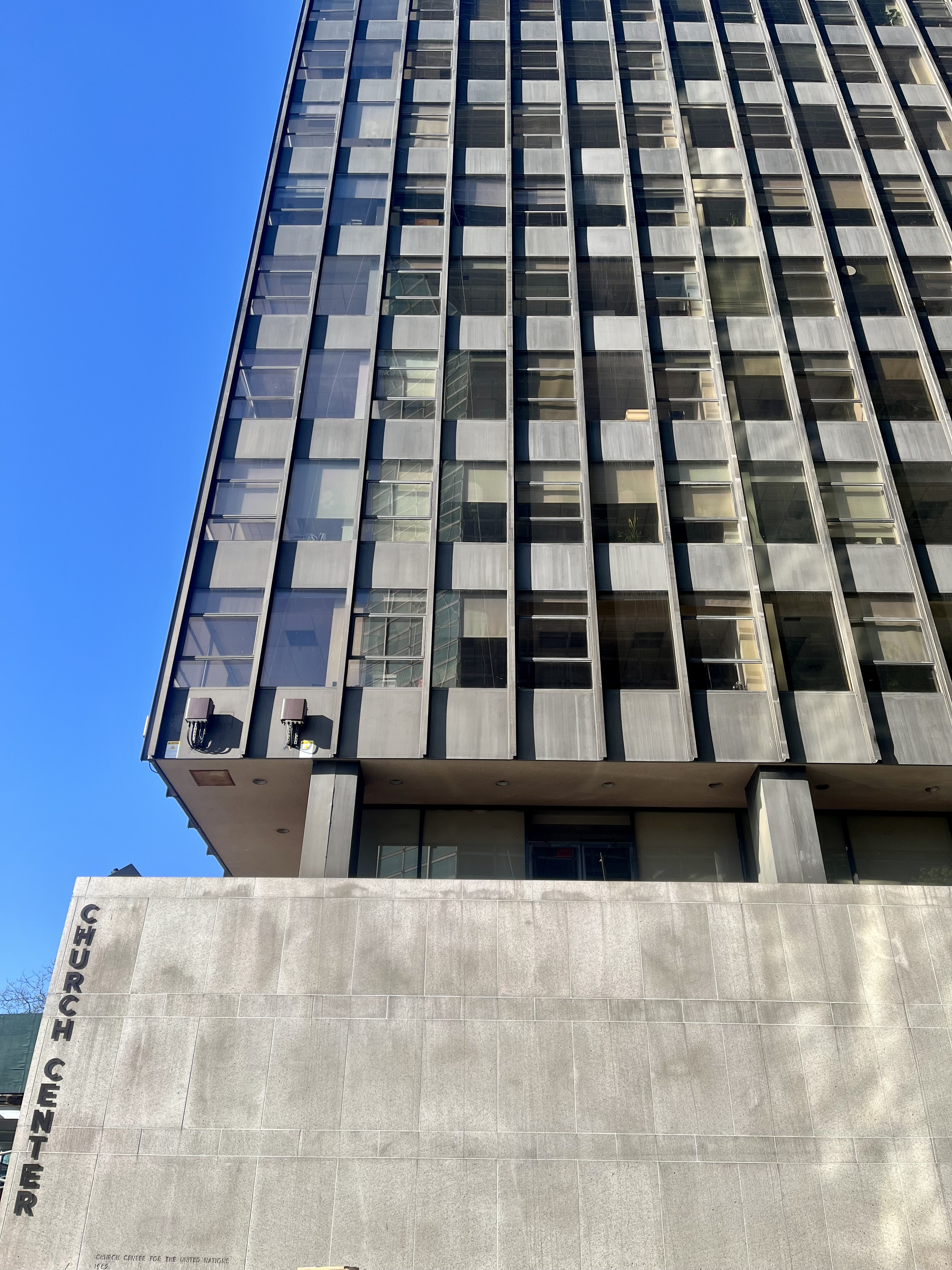
- The building's exterior, showing the office space above the chapel

General information
- Location: 777 United Nations Plaza (First Avenue), Manhattan, New York, U.S.
- Coordinates: 40°45′0.4″N 73°58′9.5″W
- Opened: September 22, 1963

Technical details
- Floor count: 12

Design and construction
- Architect: William Lescaze

The Church Center for the United Nations is a private building owned and operated by the United Women in Faith (formerly known as United Methodist Women) as an interfaith space housing the offices for the United Nations delegations from various religions as well as several non-governmental organizations. It is located at 777 United Nations Plaza, on the southwest corner of United Nations Plaza which sits on a local bypass of First Avenue and 44th Street in New York City, across the street from, but not part of, the United Nations Headquarters complex.

The 12-story building hosts various events and conferences, and is most well known for its Modernist Chapel at the United Nations, which has long been a popular venue for wedding ceremonies, especially ones between individuals of different religious or national backgrounds.

== History ==
The plan for the Church Center was first unveiled in November 1961 by the Methodist Church.Construction began in the summer of 1962 under modernist architect William Lescaze. The project cost $3 million.

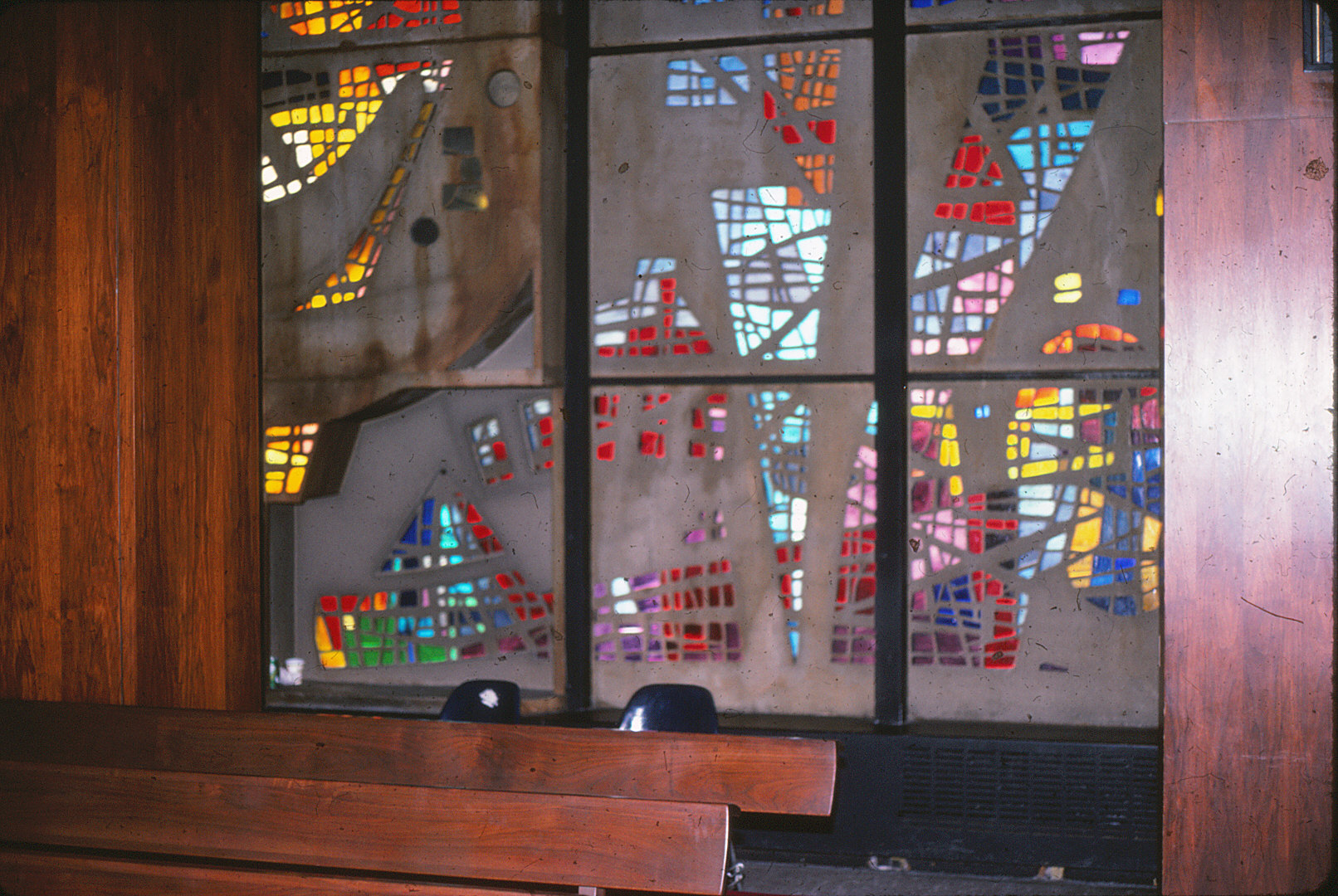
Stained glass as seen from inside the chapel

The interior design was done by the noted American ecclesiastical architect Harold Eugene Wagoner. The paired stained glass interior and exterior sculpture on the street-facing wall were created by Henry Lee Willet and Benoît Gilsoul, respectively, both of Willet Hauser Architectural Glass. The name of this large work is "Man's Search for Peace" and it shows human-like shapes around a large eye-like form. The chapel was sponsored with monies from the Women's Division of the Board of Missions of the Methodist Church; it is formally named the Tillman Chapel in honor of a prominent member of that division, Sadie Wilson Tillman. Later a small statue by Moissaye Marans entitled "Prince of Peace" was added to the inside of the chapel.

The building was dedicated in September 1963, with U.N. Secretary General U Thant, U.S. Ambassador to the UN Adlai E. Stevenson, and U.S. Secretary of State Dean Rusk all speaking at the ceremony. In addition to Methodists, representatives from the Roman Catholic and Jewish faiths were also part of the dedication. Some two thousand attendees heard U Thant praise both the U.N. and the Methodist Church for the "act of faith" that led to its construction, while Rusk spoke about the dangers of the Cold War.

== Purpose ==
From the beginning, the Church Center was intended to be interdenominational in spirit and purpose, and nonprofit groups representing various religious organizations have been housed there. The Church Center was originally administered by the National Council of Churches. Subsequently, it was run by the Methodist Church and its General Board of Church and Society. Currently it is run by the United Methodist Women organization. According to a United Methodist Women spokesperson, "[f]rom its inception, the Church Center for the U.N. was envisioned as more than a site for the Methodist Church's international work. It was to provide access to the U.N. to other faith communities and nongovernmental organizations working for human rights, development and peace."

One of the purposes for establishing the Church Center for the U.N. was to provide both laypeople and clergy a means of observing the United Nations, with conference rooms equipped to transmit U.N. debates live over loudspeakers. The Church Center has hosted people pleading causes at the United Nations, such as East Timorese independence activist José Ramos-Horta. It is also the location of most of the nongovernmental meetings on United Nations Commission on the Status of Women. Nonetheless, as the New York Times has written, "the affiliation between [the Center] and the United Nations is more spiritual than official."

== Events and uses ==
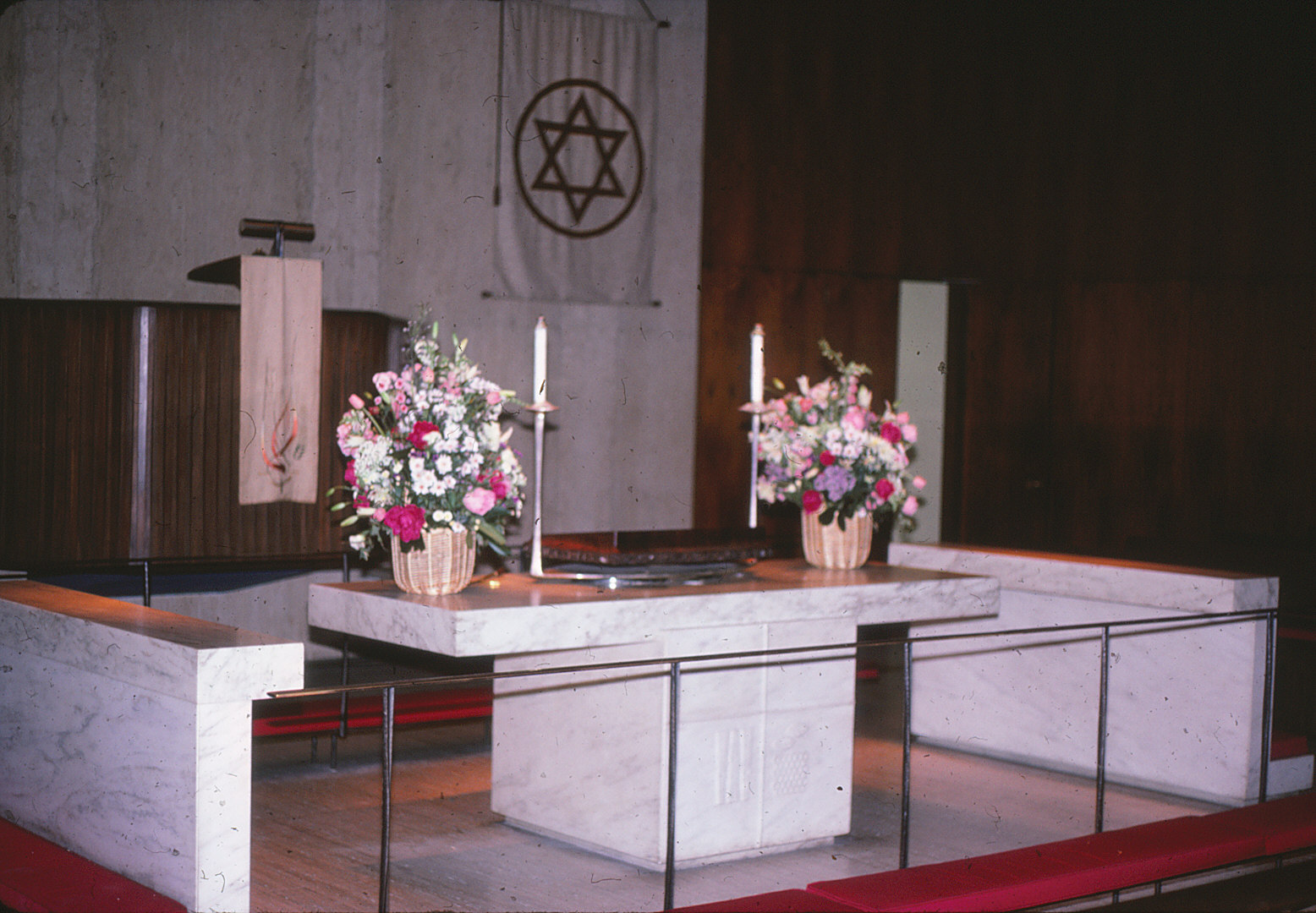
Altar of the chapel, as set up for a marriage ceremony involving elements of Judaism

The Chapel at the United Nations is well known for being the site of marriage ceremonies, and especially for couples of different religious backgrounds and faiths. By the mid-1970s, some 400 marriages a year were being held there. For a ceremony, there are banners representing various faiths that can be displayed on the chapel wall. The Chapel also attracts couples getting married from different nationalities, especially when they have met while one of them was stationed at the United Nations; in addition, people getting married for the second time, or who feel a kindred spirit with the purpose of the United Nations, also have chosen to be married there. Its use for interfaith ceremonies was mentioned in a 1985 Dear Abby column. It has been listed for this purpose on the website of the Office of the Mayor of New York City.

The Church Center charges a rental fee for use of the chapel for weddings. People married at the chapel include then-U.S. Senator Joe Biden and educator Jill Biden, in 1977. Receptions following the ceremony are sometimes held at the United Nations Plaza Hotel, located on the other side of 44th Street.

Other ceremonies also take place in the Church Center and Chapel. The memorial service for prominent black academic Z. K. Matthews from South Africa was held at the Church Center in 1968. in 1987, a memorial service for American inventor William S. Halstead was held at the Chapel by the Japanese delegation to the United Nations.

In addition, a variety of politically oriented events and conferences have taken place at the Center. In 1965, the origins of an organization known as Clergy and Laymen Concerned About Vietnam (CALCAV), which involved Jesuit priest and anti-war activist Daniel Berrigan along with the Reverend Richard John Neuhaus and Rabbi Abraham Joshua Heschel, came from an anti-war rally at the Church Center. The Global Peace Service Conference was held at the Church Center in 1993. Some events held there have been controversial, such as a hosting a panel discussion on religion with the President of Iran Mahmoud Ahmadinejad in 2007, in which representatives of some religious groups refused to participate while others thought it important to engage.

A livestream of the play Sliver of a Full Moon, a staged reading by survivors of domestic abuse on Native American tribal lands, was performed at the Chapel in 2014.

The winner of the annual Templeton Prize for progress in thought about religion is often announced at the Church Center.

== See also ==
- Edgar J. Kaufmann Conference Center, to the north
