= Manahatta (play) =

Play by Mary Kathryn Nagle

- Playbill cover from Yale Repertory Theater production
- Written by: Mary Kathryn Nagle
- Genre: Drama
- Setting: Oklahoma (21st century), Manahatta (21st/17th century)

Premiere
- Date: March 28th, 2018
- Original run: March 28th - October 27th, 2018

Manahatta is a dramatic play written by Mary Kathryn Nagle. The play takes place in 21st century Oklahoma, as well as both 21st and 17th century Manahatta (popularly known as Manhattan Island). The show follows Jane Snake as she rises the ranks of Wall Street investment firm Lehman Brothers in the years leading up to and during the 2008 financial crisis. Meanwhile, her family, specifically her mother, Bobbie, faces financial ruin following the death of her husband. The show also mirrors its characters in early 17th century Manahatta, depicting the arrival of Dutch settlers representing the Dutch East India Company, who subsequently take the land of and massacre the Delaware Lenape people, beginning the process of driving them out of Manahatta and Lenapehoking.

The show seeks to draw parallels between the original process of colonization and genocide towards Native Americans during the colonial era in what would become the United States to the continued colonial process and removal/denial of culture, perpetuated in part by the system of capitalism.

Manahatta features usage of traditional Lenape language throughout the show. Many of its sequences in the 17th century are based on historical record, portraying the invasion of the Dutch into Manahatta, and the "purchasing" of Manhattan from the Delaware Lenape by the Dutch East India Company. These scenes are juxtaposed with the characters in the 21st century, who are portrayed by the same actors, performing "mirrored" storylines to each other. Peter Minuit, who performed the "purchase", is a featured character in the show, mirrored with Richard S. Fuld Jr. of Lehman Brothers. The name Se-ket-tu-may-qua (translated to Black Beaver in English), which is the name of Luke's mirrored character, is the name of a 19th-century Lenape leader who led Union soldiers hundreds of miles during the Civil War. Jonas Michaelius, Michael's mirrored character, is the name of a Dutch clergyman who was involved with colonizing Manahatta.

== Productions ==
=== Public Studio (pre-premiere) ===
As one of the first two plays to be put on by Public Studio (a program by The Public Theater), Manahatta was featured in a "pared-down" production of the show at the Shiva Theater in New York City from May 15 to May 25, 2014. Directed by Kate Whoriskey, its cast featured Tanis Parenteau (Jane/Le-Le-Wa-You), Kimberly Guerrero (Debra/Toosh-Ki-Pa-Kwis-I), Neal Huff (Assistant/Joe), Brandon Oakes (Soldier/Se-Ket-Tu-May-Qua), Andrew Weems (Jonas Michaelius), and Albert Ybarra (Robert/Tamanend). Before the first performance on May 15, 2014, a prayer was given in Lenape by Curtis Zunigha, (at the time) the Operations Manager and former Chief of the Delaware Tribe. The show was changed before its subsequent premiere at the Oregon Shakespeare Festival in 2018.

=== Oregon Shakespeare Festival ===
Manahatta premiered as part of the Oregon Shakespeare Festival at the Thomas Theater on March 28, 2018. It was directed by Laurie Woolery, with the only cast member returning from the pre-premiere production being Tanis Parenteau (Jane Snake/Le-le-wa'-you), and a premiering cast of Sheila Tousey (Bobbie/Mother), Rainbow Dickerson (Debra/Toosh-ki-pa-kwis-i), Steven Flores (Luke/Se-ket-tu-may-qua), Danforth Comins (Joe/Jakob), Jeffrey King (Dick Fuld/Peter Minuit), and David Kelly (Michael/Jonas Michaelius). The show was met with critical success, and ran until October 27, 2018.

=== Yale Repertory Theater ===
The East Coast premiere of the show, Manahatta ran at the Yale Repertory Theater in New Haven, Connecticut, from January 24 to February 15, 2020. This production was once again directed by Laurie Woolery, with Steven Flores (Luke/Se-ket-tu-may-qua), Danforth Comins (Joe/Jakob), and Jeffrey King (Dick Fuld/Peter Minuit) returning to the cast, with new cast members Carla-Rae (Bobbie/Mother), Lily Gladstone (Jane Snake/Le-le-wa'-you), Shyla Lefner (Debra/Toosh-ki-pa-kwis-i), and T. Ryder Smith (Michael/Jonas Michaelius) joining. It was the first play to be produced at the Yale Repertory Theater by a Native American playwright or to have a majority Native cast. At the request of one of his descendants, the set of the show featured a large image of Se-ket-tu-may-qua. This production was also met with critical success.

=== University of Pennsylvania ===
As a production of the student-run theater company, the Front Row Theatre Company, Manahatta ran at the University of Pennsylvania at the Heyer Sky Lounge in Harrison College House from February 20 to February 22, 2020. Directed by Connor Beard, this was the first student production of the show, featuring the cast of Duval Courteau (Jane Snake/Le-le-wa'-you), Mika Graviet (Bobbie/Mother), and David Hernandez (Luke/Se-ket-tu-may-qua) (the remainder of the cast is unlisted).

=== Public Theater ===
The Public Theater ran a production from November 16 to December 23, 2023, directed by Laurie Woolery. The cast featured Rainbow Dickerson as Toosh-ki-pa-kwis-i/Debra, Elizabeth Frances as Le-le-wa'-you/Jane, David Kelly as Jonas Michaelius/Michael, Jeffrey King as Peter Minuit/Dick, Enrico Nassi as Se-ket-tu-may-qua/Luke, Joe Tapper as Jakob/Joe and Sheila Tousey as Mother/Bobbie. For her work, Nagle was nominated for the 2024 Outer Critics Circle John Gassner Award, and the production was nominated for two Drama Desk Awards and a Lucille Lortel Award.

== Awards and nominations ==
=== 2023 Off-Broadway production ===
Year	Award	Category	Work	Result	Ref.
2024	Drama Desk Awards	Outstanding Featured Performance in a Play	Sheila Tousey	Nominated	
2024	Drama Desk Awards	Outstanding Costume Design of a Play	Lux Haac	Nominated	
2024	Outer Critics Circle Award	John Gassner Award	Mary Kathryn Nagle	Nominated	
2024	Lucille Lortel Award	Outstanding Costume Design	Lux Haac	Won	
