= Sallie Farney =

Muscogee woman

Sallie Farney (c. 1820s - death date unknown) was a Muscogee woman who recounted her experiences of displacement in the Trail of Tears. Her life story and oral history is taught in public school curriculum in the United States to illustrate the impact of the Trail of Tears on Native Americans in the United States.

== Life ==
Farney was a young girl when the Trail of Tears impacted her family and the Muscogee people in the period of 1834–1837. Farney passed down her recollections during the Trail of Tears, the forced relocation of Native American tribes from Alabama to the American West, a period which she described as one of "heartaches and sorrow."

"The command for a removal came unexpectedly upon most of us. There was the time that we noticed that several overloaded wagons were passing our home, yet we did not grasp the meaning. However, it was not long until we found out the reason. Wagons stopped at our home and the men in charge commanded us to gather what few belongings could be crowded into the wagons. We were to be taken away and leave our homes never to return."

— Sallie Farney, Trail of Tears Recollections

During the arduous journey, members of Farney's immediate family died, including her grandfather.

== Legacy ==
In 1937, Farney's granddaughter, Mary Hill, recounted Farney's stories in an oral history for the Indian-Pioneer Papers Project which was first published in the Trail of Tears Diary. Farney's life story has been included in periodicals and content produced by the National Indigenous Women's Resource Center and in the Family Stories From the Trail of Tears, a collection edited by Lorrie Montiero and transcribed by Grant Foreman.

In 2016, Farney's story was featured in a documentary titled "The 'Indian Problem'," which was narrated by Robert Redford and is on view at the National Museum of the American Indian.
