= Sliver of a Full Moon =

Play by Mary Kathryn Nagle

Sliver of a Full Moon is a play by Mary Kathryn Nagle. The play was written in 2013 following the re-authorization of the Violence Against Women Act (VAWA). Mary Kathryn Nagle is an enrolled member of the Cherokee Nation, and has written and produced several plays involving law and Indian affairs.

The play is told in a semi-linear way, juxtaposing the stories of real people who suffered under the jurisdiction laws involving Indian reservations in the United States with the efforts of several indigenous men and women to re-authorize the VAWA bill. Most productions of Sliver of a Full Moon are staged readings held at law schools, as a result of Nagle's inclusion of survivors of domestic violence as characters telling their true stories in the play.

== Plot ==
The play begins with a recitation of the story Blackfish as told by Emily Johnson from the character of Emily (played by Lynn Hootch). A chorus of characters excitedly counts as they watch votes coming in on C-SPAN. Following a brief intro by several characters, the scene changes to an interview of Lisa Brunner from March 2013. A narrative then begins as Terri Henry begins her job at the Department of Justice. Terri is the only Indian in the office, which as the DOJ Woman mentions, frequently works with Indian tribes. An interview with Billie Jo Rich transitions to the next scene, in which Dennis, a police man on a reservation, gives a protective order form to a non-native man who had just beaten his wife. Terri is continually confronted with her coworkers' ostensible disillusionment and apathy about domestic violence on Indian reservations. Interviews of Lynn Hootch and Diane Millich lead into a narrative of a white man calling the police and informing Dennis that he had just beaten his wife. Dennis reluctantly informs him that he has no jurisdiction over non-natives. A group of survivors echoes similar stories, citing Oliphant as the reason for the jurisdiction issues.

Dennis and Terri meet at a Tribal Council meeting in Cherokee, North Carolina and they discuss strategies to pass the 2005 version of VAWA. A series of conversations with several politicians (including Lisa Murkowski, Scott Brown, Susan Collins, Olympia Snowe, Marco Rubio, Mike Lee, and other senators and their staffers) depicts their progress campaigning for support for the bill and attempting to maintain the bill in its entirety. When the senate votes, VAWA receives 68 votes, thus securing a super-majority and is passed, but with an exception for Alaskan tribes. The exception grants only the Metlakatla tribe jurisdiction, excluding the other 228 tribes in Alaska. Dennis and Terri are disheartened but continue to fight to get the bill to pass in the House of Representatives.

A chorus of characters recount a time before tribal jurisdiction was removed, and how life changed when it did. They lament the oppression of Native women. It is revealed that House Majority Leader Eric Cantor refused to put the bill to a vote, effectively killing the bill. Senator Patrick Leahy reintroduces the bill immediately. After a series of interviews giving more insight into the effects of jurisdiction laws effect Native Americans, the Senate vote comes in, again passing, but this time with 78 votes. An excerpt from an interview with Tom Cole leads into Cole's successful bid to convince Cantor to put the bill to a vote. The scene from the beginning of the play of excited vote-counting repeats, and there is a mixed response of celebration upon passing the house with 286 votes and disappointment about Alaska's exclusion and other failures of the bill. The chorus of characters reflects upon the passing of VAWA, agreeing that it is a step in the right direction, but is by no means a full measure.

== Themes ==
=== Sovereignty ===
The sovereignty of the United States and Native tribes plays a significant thematic role in the play. Many of the survivors discuss the negative effects that Oliphant v. Suquamish Indian Tribe had on their lives. The case held that, "Indian tribal courts do not have inherent criminal jurisdiction to try and to punish non-Indians, and hence may not assume such jurisdiction unless specifically authorized to do so by Congress," thus effectively increasing crime rates of non-Indians on reservations. Even with the passing of VAWA, the sovereignty of tribes as "domestic dependent nations" is still contested, as the act established a framework to prosecute sex offenders through the US court system instead of tribal courts, even if the crime occurs on tribal land. The US has much stronger negotiating power, and many opponents of tribal sovereignty assert that for the US to cede any more authority to tribes than the little they already have would be detrimental to the overall sovereignty of the United States. The resistance of these opponents is a daunting obstacle for any attempt to legitimize the authority of tribal law.

=== Domestic Abuse ===
A poignant facet of any given production of Sliver of a Full Moon is the inclusion of Native American survivors of domestic abuse. These women were targeted as a result of the legal ambiguities surrounding tribal jurisdiction to prosecute non-Indians. VAWA was instrumental in the establishment of protections for victims on tribal land who previously had no means of discourse to prosecute sex offenders. The inclusion of Native tribes (except for most Alaskan tribes) in the provided protections was a somewhat circuitous to enforce laws when the tribes would otherwise have no means to do so.

== Cast ==
=== September 21, 2014 performances in NYC ===
- Lisa Brunner (White Earth Ojibwe Nation) as herself
- Kenneth Ruthardt (Mescalero Apache) as Tom Cole
- Lenora "Lynn" Hootch (Yupik Eskimo, Village of Emmonak) as herself
- Myrt Runningwolf (Blackfeet Nation) as Dennis White Hawk
- Kimberly Norris Guerrero (Colville, Salish-Kootenai, Cherokee) as Terri Henry
- Diane Millich (Southern Ute) as herself
- Jennifer Bobiwash (Ojibwe) as Deborah Parker
- Billie Jo Rich (Cherokee) as herself
- Richard Curtis Hostler (Hupa/Yurok/Karuk) as Chorus Man
- Nettie Warbelow (Athabaskan, Village of Tetlin) as herself
- Joann Horn as herself
- Tami Jerue as herself
- Priscalla Kameroff as herself

=== Other performances ===
- Elaina Albers (Yurok) as herself
- Lisa Rose Sanderson (Yurok) as herself
- Shirley Moses as herself

== Productions ==
Date	Location
June 11, 2013	National Indigenous Women's Resource Center's conference, "Women Are Sacred" in Albuquerque, NM
October 14, 2013	NCAI Annual Convention in Tulsa, OK
September 21, 2014	The Church Center for the United Nations Chapel in New York
September 21, 2014	Joe's Pub at The Public Theater in New York
March 31, 2015	Yale Law School
November 15, 2015	Radcliffe Institute of Advanced Study, Harvard University
March 23, 2016	Institute of American Indian Arts (IAIA) in Santa Fe, New Mexico
April 22, 2016	New York University
May 10, 2016	Stanford Law School
June 14, 2016	The Rasmuson Theatre of the Smithsonian National Museum of the American Indian
October 19, 2016	David Salmon Tribal Hall in Fairbanks, AK
November 17, 2016	The Yurok Tribal Office in Klamath, CA

== Response ==
Sliver of a Full Moon is produced exclusively as a staged reading by survivors of domestic abuse on tribal land, and as a result is produced almost exclusively at Law Schools which have the budget and interest in the subject matter to justify its production. As such, reception both before and after each reading is generally enthusiastic. The performance at the Institute of American Indian Art drew enormous crowds, and Daniel Banks, the Chair of the Performing Arts Department at the IAIA was quoted saying, "I am excited about this partnership with the Yale Group for the Study of Native America, Yale Indigenous Performing Arts Program, and Yale Native American Cultural Center. Mary Kathryn Nagle is a visionary playwright and activist. This is an exciting opportunity for our students to meet a vital artist, watch her work, and participate in the process. We very much appreciate the work of all these groups at Yale to bring such an important piece of social and political theatre to our campus and to Santa Fe."
