= List of United States Supreme Court cases, volume 31 =

Supreme Court of the United States
- Interactive map of Supreme Court of the United States
- 38°53′26″N 77°00′16″W
- Established: March 4, 1789; 237 years ago
- Location: Washington, D.C.
- Coordinates: 38°53′26″N 77°00′16″W
- Composition method: Presidential nomination with Senate confirmation
- Authorised by: Constitution of the United States, Art. III, § 1
- Judge term length: life tenure, subject to impeachment and removal
- Number of positions: 9 (by statute)
- Website: supremecourt.gov

This is a list of cases reported in volume 31 (6 Pet.) of United States Reports, decided by the Supreme Court of the United States in 1832.

== Nominative reports ==
In 1874, the U.S. government created the United States Reports, and retroactively numbered older privately published case reports as part of the new series. As a result, cases appearing in volumes 1–90 of U.S. Reports have dual citation forms; one for the volume number of U.S. Reports, and one for the volume number of the reports named for the relevant reporter of decisions (these are called "nominative reports").

=== Richard Peters, Jr. ===
Starting with the 26th volume of U.S. Reports, the Reporter of Decisions of the Supreme Court of the United States was Richard Peters Jr. Peters was Reporter of Decisions from 1828 to 1843, covering volumes 26 through 41 of United States Reports which correspond to volumes 1 through 16 of his Peters's Reports. As such, the dual form of citation to, for example, Kelly v. Jackson is 31 U.S. (6 Pet.) 622 (1832).

== Justices of the Supreme Court at the time of 31 U.S. (6 Pet.) ==
The Supreme Court is established by Article III, Section 1 of the Constitution of the United States, which says: "The judicial Power of the United States, shall be vested in one supreme Court . . .". The size of the Court is not specified; the Constitution leaves it to Congress to set the number of justices. Under the Judiciary Act of 1789 Congress originally fixed the number of justices at six (one chief justice and five associate justices). Since 1789 Congress has varied the size of the Court from six to seven, nine, ten, and back to nine justices (always including one chief justice).

When the cases in 31 U.S. (6 Pet.) were decided, the Court comprised these seven justices:

| Portrait | Justice | Office | Home State | Succeeded | Date confirmed by the Senate (Vote) | Tenure on Supreme Court |
|---|---|---|---|---|---|---|
| | John Marshall | Chief Justice | Virginia | Oliver Ellsworth | January 27, 1801 (Acclamation) | February 4, 1801 – July 6, 1835 (Died) |
| | William Johnson | Associate Justice | South Carolina | Alfred Moore | March 24, 1804 (Acclamation) | May 7, 1804 – August 4, 1834 (Died) |
| | Gabriel Duvall | Associate Justice | Maryland | Samuel Chase | November 18, 1811 (Acclamation) | November 23, 1811 – January 12, 1835 (Resigned) |
| | Joseph Story | Associate Justice | Massachusetts | William Cushing | November 18, 1811 (Acclamation) | February 3, 1812 – September 10, 1845 (Died) |
| | Smith Thompson | Associate Justice | New York | Henry Brockholst Livingston | December 9, 1823 (Acclamation) | September 1, 1823 – December 18, 1843 (Died) |
| | John McLean | Associate Justice | Ohio | Robert Trimble | March 7, 1829 (Acclamation) | January 11, 1830 – April 4, 1861 (Died) |
| | Henry Baldwin | Associate Justice | Pennsylvania | Bushrod Washington | January 6, 1830 (41–2) | January 18, 1830 – April 21, 1844 (Died) |

== Notable Case in 31 U.S. (6 Pet.) ==
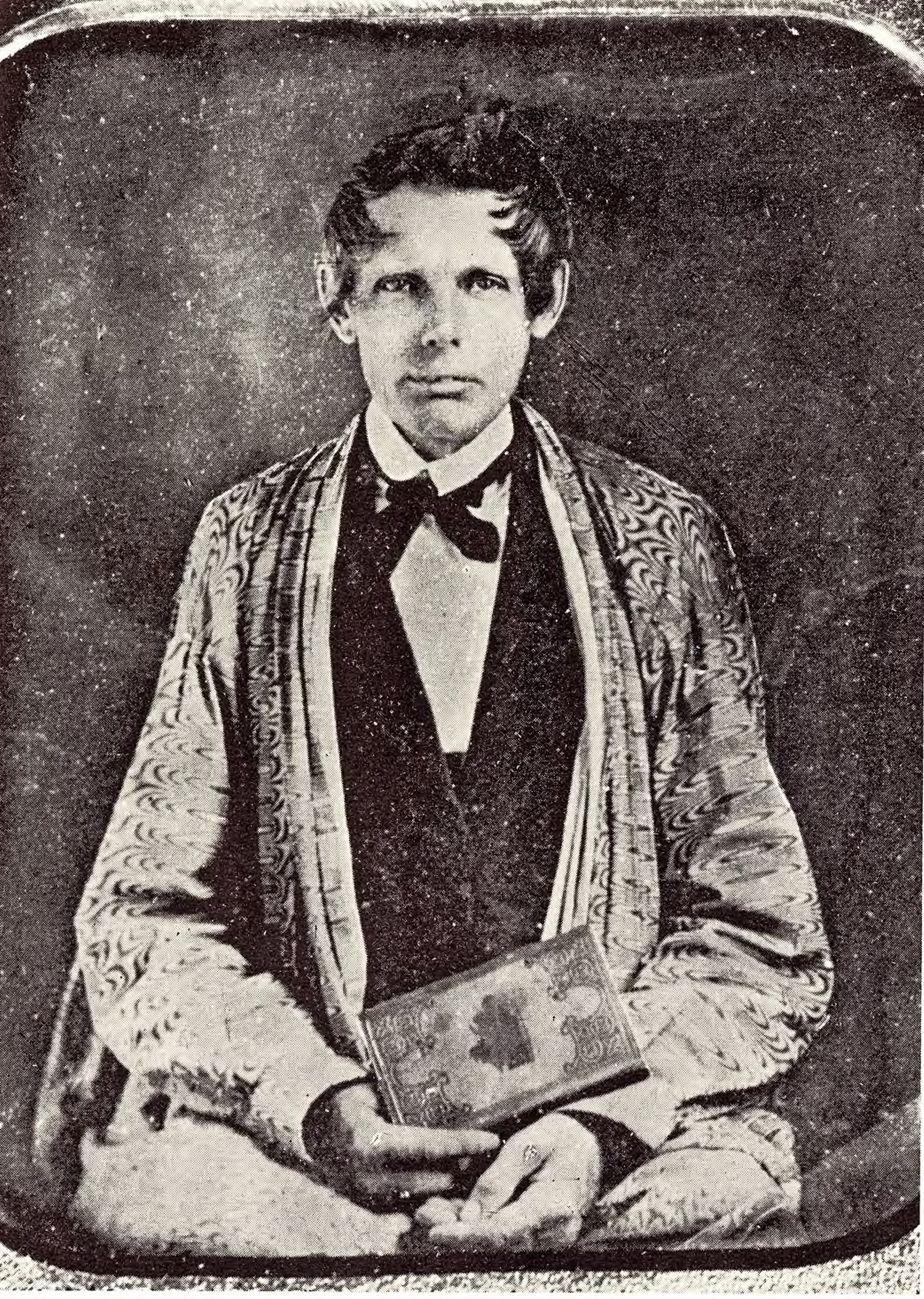
Samuel Worcester

=== Worcester v. Georgia ===
In Worcester v. Georgia, 31 U.S. (6 Pet.) 515 (1832), the Supreme Court held that the Georgia criminal statute that prohibited non-Native Americans from being present on Native American lands without a license from the state was unconstitutional. The opinion by Chief Justice John Marshall is most famous for its dicta, which laid out the relationship among tribes, state governments, and the federal government. The decision is considered to have built the foundations of the doctrine of tribal sovereignty in the United States. Marshall laid out in this opinion that the relationship between the Indian Nations and the United States is that of nations. He reasoned that the United States, in the character of the federal government, inherited the legal rights of The Crown. Those rights, he stated, included the sole right to negotiate with the Indian nations of North America, to the exclusion of all other European powers. This did not include the rights of possession to their land or political dominion over their laws. He acknowledged that the exercise of conquest and purchase can give political dominion, but that those are in the hands of the federal government, and individual states had no authority in American Indian affairs.

== Citation style ==
Under the Judiciary Act of 1789 the federal court structure at the time comprised District Courts, which had general trial jurisdiction; Circuit Courts, which had mixed trial and appellate (from the US District Courts) jurisdiction; and the United States Supreme Court, which had appellate jurisdiction over the federal District and Circuit courts—and for certain issues over state courts. The Supreme Court also had limited original jurisdiction (i.e., in which cases could be filed directly with the Supreme Court without first having been heard by a lower federal or state court). There were one or more federal District Courts and/or Circuit Courts in each state, territory, or other geographical region.

Bluebook citation style is used for case names, citations, and jurisdictions.

- "C.C.D." = United States Circuit Court for the District of . . .
  - e.g.,"C.C.D.N.J." = United States Circuit Court for the District of New Jersey
- "D." = United States District Court for the District of . . .
  - e.g.,"D. Mass." = United States District Court for the District of Massachusetts
- "E." = Eastern; "M." = Middle; "N." = Northern; "S." = Southern; "W." = Western
  - e.g.,"C.C.S.D.N.Y." = United States Circuit Court for the Southern District of New York
  - e.g.,"M.D. Ala." = United States District Court for the Middle District of Alabama
- "Ct. Cl." = United States Court of Claims
- The abbreviation of a state's name alone indicates the highest appellate court in that state's judiciary at the time.
  - e.g.,"Pa." = Supreme Court of Pennsylvania
  - e.g.,"Me." = Supreme Judicial Court of Maine

== List of cases in 31 U.S. (6 Pet.) ==
| Case Name | Page and year | Opinion of the Court | Concurring opinion(s) | Dissenting opinion(s) | Lower Court | Disposition |
|---|---|---|---|---|---|---|
| Schimmelpennick v. Turner | 1 (1832) | Thompson | none | none | C.C.D. Md. | certification |
| Second Bank of the United States v. Bank of Washington | 8 (1832) | Thompson | none | none | C.C.D.C. | reversed |
| Kirkman v. Hamilton | 20 (1832) | Marshall | none | none | C.C.D.W. Tenn. | certification |
| Second Bank of the United States v. Green | 26 (1832) | Marshall | none | none | C.C.D. Ohio | dismissed |
| United States v. Bank of North Carolina | 29 (1832) | Story | none | none | C.C.D.N.C. | certification |
| Davis v. Packard | 41 (1832) | Thompson | none | none | N.Y. | dismissal denied |
| Second Bank of the United States v. Dunn | 51 (1832) | McLean | none | none | C.C.D.C. | reversed |
| Miller's Heirs v. M'Intyre | 61 (1832) | McLean | none | none | C.C.D. Ky. | affirmed |
| Smith v. Bell | 68 (1832) | Marshall | none | none | C.C.D.E. Tenn. | certification |
| Moore v. Bank of Columbia | 86 (1832) | Thompson | none | none | C.C.D.C. | reversed |
| Peirsoll v. Elliott | 95 (1832) | Marshall | none | none | C.C.D. Ky. | reversed |
| Levy's Lessee v. M'Cartee | 102 (1832) | Story | none | none | C.C.S.D.N.Y. | certification |
| Sicard's Lessee v. Davis | 124 (1832) | Marshall | none | none | C.C.D. Ky. | reversed |
| United States v. Paul | 141 (1832) | Marshall | none | none | C.C.S.D.N.Y. | certification |
| Oliver v. Alexander | 143 (1832) | Story | none | none | C.C.D. Md. | dismissed |
| Spring v. Gray's Executors | 151 (1832) | Marshall | none | none | C.C.D. Me. | affirmed |
| Dufau v. Couprey's Heirs | 170 (1832) | Marshall | none | none | E.D. La. | affirmed |
| Cox v. United States | 172 (1832) | Thompson | none | none | E.D. La. | reversed |
| M'Arthur v. Porter | 205 (1832) | Story | none | none | C.C.D. Ohio | reversed |
| Ex parte Roberts | 216 (1832) | Marshall | none | none | S.D.N.Y. | mandamus denied |
| Grant v. Raymond | 218 (1832) | Marshall | none | none | C.C.S.D.N.Y. | reversed |
| Second Bank of the United States v. Hatch | 250 (1832) | Story | none | none | C.C.D. Ohio | affirmed |
| M'Donald's Heirs v. Smalley | 261 (1832) | Marshall | none | none | C.C.D. Ohio | affirmed |
| Conard v. Pacific Insurance Company | 262 (1832) | Story | none | none | C.C.E.D. Pa. | affirmed |
| Ross v. M'Lung | 283 (1832) | Marshall | none | none | C.C.D.E. Tenn. | affirmed |
| Green v. Neal's Lessee | 291 (1832) | McLean | none | none | C.C.D.W. Tenn. | reversed |
| Greenleaf's Lessee v. Birth | 302 (1832) | Story | Marshall | Marshall | C.C.D.C. | reversed |
| Leland v. Wilkinson | 317 (1832) | Marshall | none | none | C.C.D.R.I. | certification |
| New Jersey v. New York | 323 (1832) | Marshall | none | none | original | continued |
| Boardman v. Reed's Lessees | 328 (1832) | McLean | none | none | W.D. Va. | affirmed |
| Boyle v. Zacharie I | 348 (1832) | Marshall | none | none | C.C.D. Md. | inquiry answered |
| Scott v. Lunt's Administrator | 349 (1832) | Marshall | none | none | C.C.D.C. | dismissal denied |
| United States v. Reyburn | 352 (1832) | Thompson | none | none | C.C.D. Md. | certification |
| Hughes v. Town of Clarksville | 369 (1832) | Marshall | none | none | D. Ind. | reversed |
| Watts v. Waddle | 389 (1832) | McLean | none | none | C.C.D. Ohio | affirmed |
| M'Lane v. United States | 404 (1832) | Story | none | none | C.C.D. Del. | reversed |
| City of Cincinnati v. White's Lessee | 431 (1832) | Thompson | none | none | C.C.D. Ohio | reversed |
| United States v. Quincy | 445 (1832) | Thompson | none | none | C.C.D. Md. | certification |
| United States v. Nourse | 470 (1832) | McLean | none | none | C.C.D.C. | reversed |
| Barclay v. Howell's Lessee | 498 (1832) | McLean | none | none | C.C.W.D. Pa. | reversed |
| Worcester v. Georgia | 515 (1832) | Marshall | McLean | Baldwin | Ga. Super. Ct. | reversed |
| Crane v. Morriss's Lessee | 598 (1832) | Story | none | Baldwin | C.C.S.D.N.Y. | affirmed |
| Kelly v. Jackson | 622 (1832) | Story | none | Baldwin | C.C.S.D.N.Y. | affirmed |
| United States v. M'Daniel | 634 (1832) | Marshall | none | none | C.C.D.C. | dismissal denied |
| Boyle v. Zacharie II | 635 (1832) | Story | none | none | C.C.D. Md. | affirmed |
| Boyle v. Zacharie III | 648 (1832) | Story | none | none | C.C.D. Md. | affirmed |
| Ex parte Davenport | 661 (1832) | Story | none | none | C.C.S.D.N.Y. | mandamus denied |
| Lindsey v. Miller's Lessee | 666 (1832) | McLean | none | Baldwin | C.C.D. Ohio | affirmed |
| Wallace v. Parker | 680 (1832) | Marshall | none | none | Ohio | affirmed |
| United States v. Arredondo | 691 (1832) | Baldwin | none | Thompson | Fla. Super. Ct. | affirmed |
| Gassies v. Ballon | 761 (1832) | Marshall | none | none | D. La. | affirmed |
| Strother v. Lucas | 763 (1832) | Thompson | none | none | D. Mo. | affirmed |
| Ex parte Bradstreet | 774 (1832) | Marshall | none | none | N.D.N.Y. | command to appear |
| United States v. Phillips | 776 (1832) | per curiam | none | none | C.C.E.D. Pa. | dismissed |
| Veitch v. Farmers' Bank | 777 (1832) | per curiam | none | none | C.C.D.C. | dismissed |
| Boyce v. Grundy | 777 (1832) | per curiam | none | none | C.C.D.W. Tenn. | dismissed |

== See also ==
- certificate of division
