= Violence against women in the United States =

Public health issue of violent acts against women

Violence against women in the United States is the use of domestic abuse, murder, sex-trafficking, rape and assault against women in the United States. It has been recognized as a public health concern. Family and domestic violence is a common problem in the United States, affecting an estimated 10 million people every year. Culture in the United States has led towards the trivialization of violence towards women, with media in the United States possibly contributing to making women-directed violence appear unimportant to the public.

== History ==
The history of laws and cultural taboos have a current effect on how new sexual assault laws are drafted, how the laws are applied by law enforcement, and how police decide whether to arrest a suspected perpetrator. The history of sexual assault prosecutions influences whether or not current cases are taken to court. Judges and juries make decisions to convict based upon their past knowledge on the topic of sexual assault.

== Media ==
Media that sexually objectify women by portraying them in ways that emphasize physical beauty and sexual readiness as well as reduce them to decorative and sexual objects have been identified by scholars as a powerful cultural risk factor encouraging sexual harassment and sexual violence.the imagery of women being sexually victimized in advertisements, pornography, films and music videos has been shown to increase support for violence toward women.

In a study published in 2008, it was found that in nearly 2,000 print advertisements of 58 magazines popular in the United States, 50% of ads depicted women as sex objects, appearing as a victim in about 10% of advertisements. The main magazines featuring sexual objectification of women were of the fashion and adolescent topics. These advertisements often portrayed women in various positions and expressions that were derived from pornography. The study also stated that women in the United States feel that rape is "trivialized in American culture" and concluded that "media imagery that presents women as both sex object and as victims" has possibly contributed to this trivialization.

A 2016 study regarding the objectification of women in the media found that men's magazines, reality television and pornography brought upon more thoughts of objectification, which in turn led to more support of violence toward women. In the study's results, it is stated "the relationship between objectifying media exposure and attitudes supportive of violence against women was fully mediated by notions of women as sex objects". Similarly, a 2024 study analyzing American true crime podcasts has shown that narrative conventions within the genre continue to dehumanize murdered women, just as what traditional news media did, by focusing on their bodies and suffering rather than representing their personhood and life experiences.

== Effects ==
Violence against women can lead to immediate physical injuries and longer-term mental and physical health conditions. In addition to negatively impacting mental and physical health, violence against women can interfere with life at work, home, and school. In some cases, violence results in death.

Children exposed to violence are also at risk for developing mental and physical health problems. Depending on their age, children may react differently to exposure.

Domestic violence is one of the leading causes of homelessness among women. According to research, about 80% of homeless women have experienced domestic violence before. Women and families are the fastest-growing of homeless population groups in the United States.

== Types of violence ==
=== Domestic violence ===
According to the Centers for Disease Control and Prevention and the National Institute of Justice, about 1 in every 4 women suffer from at least one physical assault experience from a partner during adulthood. A 2007 report found that in about 64% of female homicides were perpetrated by a partner or family member. Intimate partner abuse may also include other types behavior considered abusive. These are instances in which one partner seeks to control finances, force isolation from friends and family and dominate the relationship.

Women who have been identified as being at a higher risk for domestic and sexual abuse are older women, those living in rural communities, disabled women and immigrants. Addressing and preventing such violence may be difficult because some women do not have nearby access to victim services. A woman may also have language barriers, economic and psychological dependence on the perpetrator.

In some instances of violence, a woman and her children may not be able to procure housing apart from the perpetrator. Between 22 and 57% and of these women become homeless. Due to housing regulations that practice a 'no tolerance' policy requiring eviction of all household members when even one person is convicted of any crime, battered women can then be homeless as a result. This practice essentially creates a disincentive for reporting violence in the home. Some women who have experienced violence in the home risk the loss of their jobs related to their need for medical treatment, counselling, finding new housing and legal protection.

=== Rape ===
The percentage of women who have been raped in the United States is between 15% and 20%, with various studies disagreeing with each other. (National Violence Against Women survey in 1995, 17.6% rate; a 2007 Department of Justice study on rape found 18% rate). About 500 women were raped per day in the United States in 2008. About 21.8% of rapes of female victims in the United States are gang rapes.

A March 2013 report from the United States Department of Justice's Bureau of Justice Statistics, from 1995 to 2010, the estimated annual rate of female rape or sexual assault had declined by 58%, from 5.0 victimizations per 1,000 females age 12 or older to 2.1 per 1,000. However, a study in 2013 regarding rape in the United States found that cases remain underreported. Law enforcement in the United States also manipulates rape statistics to "create the illusion of success in fighting violent crime" according to a 2014 study. When investigated, defendants are rarely convicted.

=== Sexual assault ===
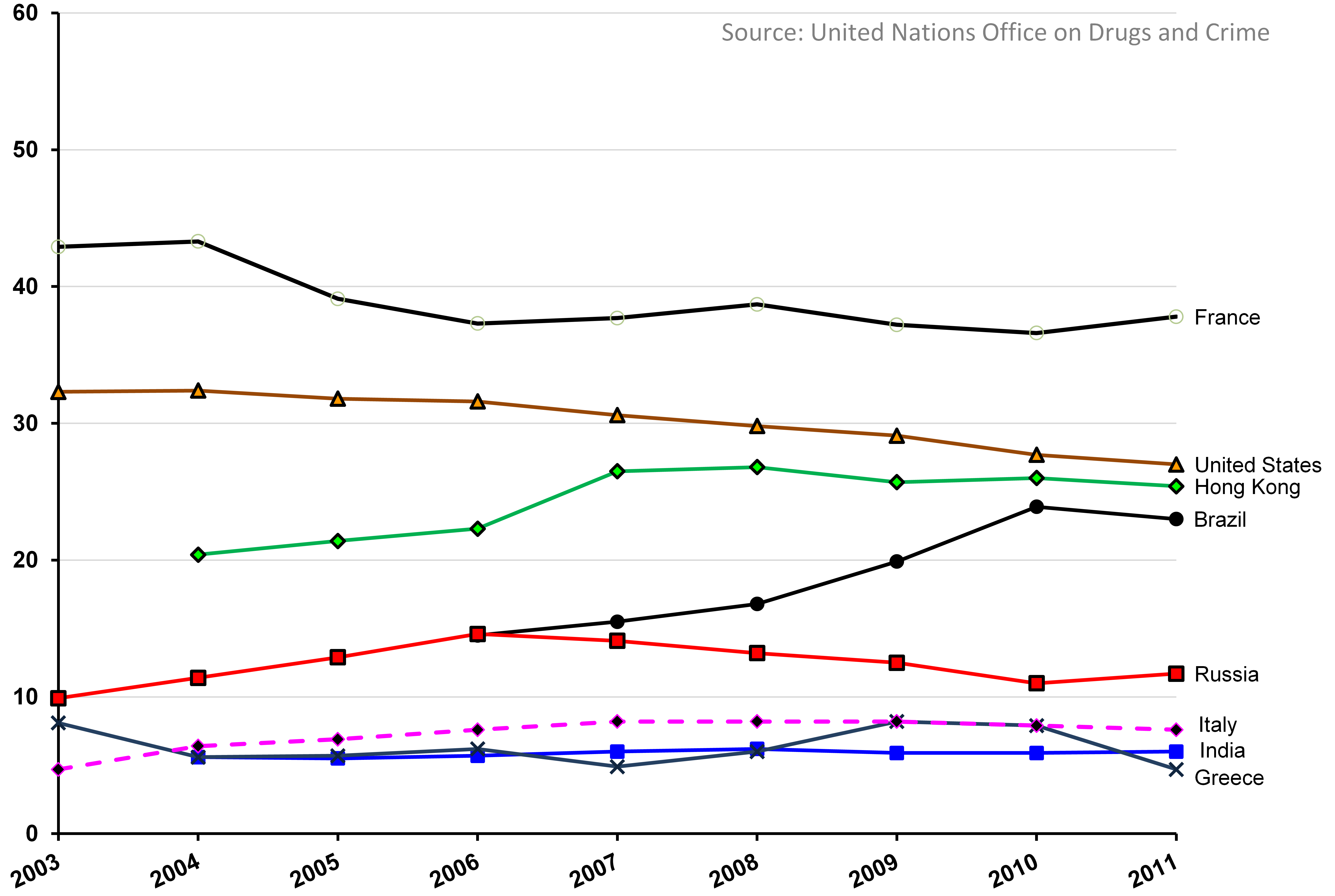
Annual rape and all forms of sexual assaults per 100,000 people

Sexual assault differs significantly from other crimes of assault. For sexual assault, the severity of the crime has been determined by establishing the victim's moral character, behavior, signs of resistance and verbal expressions of non-consensual participation. The crime of battery, another type of assault, is determined by the perpetrators actions and intent. The victim's response to this type of assault does not determine whether a crime has taken place or not. The victim does not have to demonstrate that they resisted, gave consent or have a history of being punched. In addition, the question of assault occurring after consent is given complicates the understanding of violence and injury - even if sex is consensual. Changes in the laws regarding some sexual acts may "lead to the glorification of sexual violence".

==== Objectification ====
A 2015 study by the University of Nebraska–Lincoln found that college women in the United States who were victims of sexual violence or partner violence began to self-objectificate themselves and felt body shame. Native American women have been objectified in popular culture under the stereotype of the "sexy Squaw" as seen by sexy Halloween costumes and other avenues such as fashion shows which use the aesthetic of a sexually promiscuous Indigenous woman. Furthermore, Native American women were highly objectified by colonists and often raped as a method of control while establishing the New World. Under European law, Native American women became the property of their colonist husbands leading to the literal possession and subsequent objectification of Indigenous women.

=== State violence ===
==== Forced pregnancy and sterilization ====
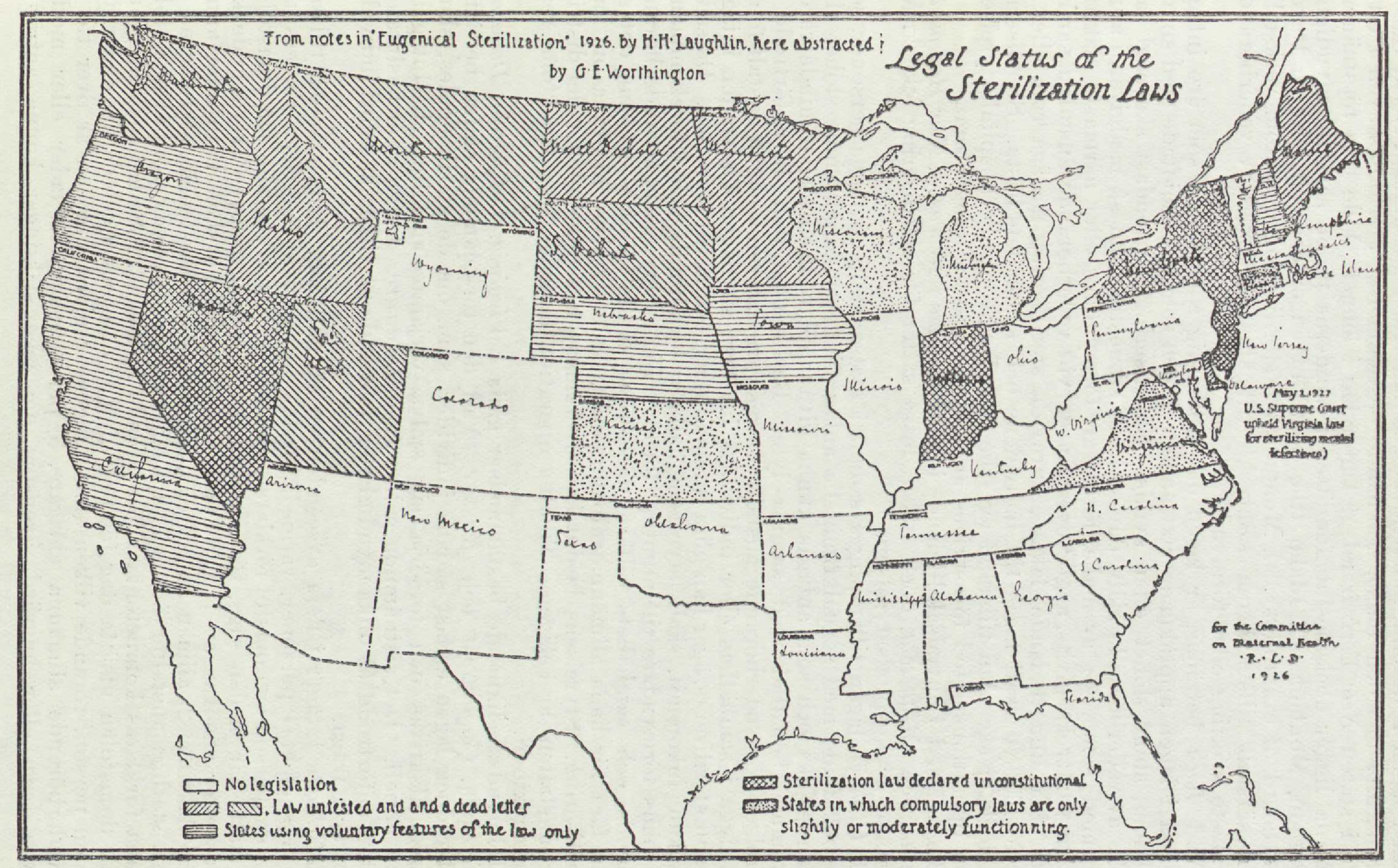
A map from a 1929 Swedish royal commission report displays the U.S. states that had implemented sterilization legislation

Forced sterilization is recognized as a type of gender-based violence. In the United States, Native American, Mexican American, African American and Puerto Rican-American women were coerced into sterilization programs, with Native Americans and African Americans especially being targeted. Many of these projects were a result of racism and eugenics in the United States. In total, 31 of 50 states had official eugenics programs with tens of thousands of women being sterilized.

President Lyndon B. Johnson's War of Poverty, upheld by the logic that the world would not have the resources necessary to care for the entire global population as argued by Dr. Barbara Gurr, a professor at University of Connecticut, led to the creation of the Office of Economic Opportunity that dealt with education, training, and contraception for the poor. The Family Planning Act of 1970 passed almost unanimously, inspired by eugenicist thinking, and the sterilization of women increased by 350% with almost 1 million women sterilized each year from 1970 to 1975.

I consider a woman who brings a child every two years as more profitable than the best man on the farm ... What she produces is an addition to the capital, while his labors disappear in mere consumption

— Thomas Jefferson

Since the days of European colonization, Europeans who arrived sought to control Native American populations in order to acquire more capital and resources from the newly discovered land. This resulted in policies of genocide and removal targeting Native American women and girls in order to procure land for settlements. Records have shown that Native American girls as young as eleven years-old had hysterectomy operations performed. Native American women have been a minority group that is easier to target for sterilization due to high levels of bureaucratic secrecy and the unique circumstances of colonization and sexual violence that has kept their plight invisible to mainstream feminist movements.

Native American women could not unseal court records that documented the sterilization practices of the Indian Health Service (IHS) at the request of the United States government. A General Accounting Office (GAO) study conducted between 1973 and 1976 found IHS facilities sterilized 3,406 Native American women in Albuquerque, Phoenix, Oklahoma City, and Aberdeen, South Dakota. Most of these women were between 15 and 44 years old. This was a large number of Native American women who were sterilized, equivalent to 452,000 non-Native American women. Many of these sterilization procedures violated the US District Court's definition of informed consent: "voluntary, knowing assent from the individual on whom any sterilization is to be performed." There was often a lack of translators to explain the severity of the procedure to Native American women and doctors withheld information about the irreversibility of the sterilization or other forms of birth control.

Physicians at the IHS were prescribing Depo-Provera, a long-term chemical contraceptive, to Native American women 20 years before it was approved by the Food and Drug Administration in 1992. This contraception has long-term side effects such as depression, osteoporosis, sterility, and cervical cancer. Many Native American women were not made aware of these side effects. Sterilization is often the default solution for contraception for Native American women, who are often coerced into such procedures by government officials. In 2004, about 1/3 of Native American women were undergoing tubal ligation, a rate that is 123% greater than for white women.

Regarding African Americans, the origin of their population control was from the slavery in the United States. During the period of slave trade in the United States, African slaves were used as a mode of production, with slave women being forced into pregnancy to increase the slave labor force. This history of controlling African American populations motivated the future sterilization of African American women.

In 1927, Supreme Court of the United States endorsed eugenics programs in the country. The ruling pushed the eugenics movement further and resulted in more forced sterilizations of women. Involuntary euthanasia was also supported by American eugenists and practiced in rare instances, with the most promoted method of euthanasia being gas chambers, though it never gained footing in the United States and sterilization became preference.

Supreme Court Justice Oliver Wendell Holmes penned:

It is better for all the world, if instead of waiting to execute degenerate offspring for crime, or to let them starve for their imbecility, society can prevent those who are manifestly unfit from continuing their kind

Eugenics and sterilization programs in the United States would later inspire Nazi eugenics. The American private foundation Rockefeller Foundation assisted with the development and funding of numerous eugenics projects in Germany, including a program directed by Josef Mengele who would later perform human experimentation at Auschwitz. During the Nuremberg trials, Nazis used Holmes' above quote to defend themselves.

== Demographics ==
=== Native Americans ===
==== Statistics ====
Native American and Alaska Native women experience high rates of violence. These acts of violence include sexual assault, domestic violence, and sex trafficking. The US Department of Justice found that 84% of Native American and Alaskan Native women have suffered some form of violence. This means Native women are 1.2 times more likely to experience violence than Non-Hispanic white women. 56.1% of Native American women experience sexual violence and more than 90% of these women were assaulted by a non-tribal member. 55.5% of these women report not being safe, and being pushed, shoved, or beaten. 48.8% experience psychological aggression by an intimate partner. Furthermore, 97% of indigenous women who are victims of violence experience it at the hands of a perpetrator who is not Native and 35% of victims experience violence from a Native person. About 33% of Native women are raped and are stalked at a rate double that of any other population.

These counts may be underestimated. Native tribal courts are not able to prosecute non-tribal members for sexual assault and rape. Non-Native American men are responsible for most of the assaults against Native American women. Psychological aggression has been experienced by 66.4% by their partner. In the US, greater than 1.5 million American Indian and Alaska Native women have suffered violence during their life.

Over 39% of American Indian and Alaska Native women have experienced violence in the past year. Of these, 14% percent were sexually abused, 9% were assaulted by their intimate partner, 12% were stalked and 25% experienced psychological aggression by their intimate partner. In the past year, over 730,000 American Indian and Alaska Native women experienced violence.

Native American women and Alaska Native women, along with black women, have high murder rates when compared with other ethnicities. Women between ages 18 and 29 comprise 36.3% of Native American women and Alaska Native women murder victims. Intimate partner violence accounts for 47% of those murdered. Current intimate partners commit 81% of the murders and 12% are committed by a past intimate partner. Jealousy, arguments and preceding violent acts occur before the murder 66% of the time. Human trafficking of Native American Women and Alaska Native women is thought to also occur, but studies and statistics are lacking.

When compared to other ethnicities, Native American women experience sexual assault and rape rates that are 2.5 higher. Though the Violence Against Women Act was reauthorized in 2013, most tribes struggle to fund jails, courts, jails, law enforcement, judges, and prevention programs.

Studies by the Pan American Health Organization and the World Health Organization reported that violence against women remains widespread across the Americas. According to a 2025 regional estimate, nearly 123 million women and girls aged 15 and older—approximately one-third of the female population in the region—have experienced physical or sexual violence at least once in their lives.

Women with disabilities in the United States experience significantly higher rates of gender-based violence compared to women without disabilities. According to the U.S. Centers for Disease Control and Prevention (CDC), more than one in four women in the country has a disability. Both women and men with disabilities face increased risks of sexual violence and intimate partner violence. Data from the National Intimate Partner and Sexual Violence Survey (NISVS) indicate that a substantial proportion of female rape victims had a disability at the time of the assault. Advocacy and public health reports highlight several structural factors that increase vulnerability. Many women with disabilities rely on caregivers or personal assistants for daily living tasks, which can create power imbalances and opportunities for abuse. Such abuse may include physical or sexual violence, neglect, withholding of mobility aids or medication, or coercive control over reproductive and sexual decisions.

Workplace violence disproportionately affects women with disabilities. A 2023 poll by The 19th News found that nearly half of women with disabilities reported experiencing sexual harassment or assault in the workplace—significantly higher than the rate reported by women without disabilities.

Researchers warn that the true prevalence of violence against women with disabilities is likely underestimated due to barriers in reporting, communication challenges, and social isolation. Limited access to shelters, legal services, and accessible reporting mechanisms further restricts many survivors from receiving support or justice.

==== Concerns About Data ====
Statistics are lacking for violence against Native American women who reside on reservations. This data can also be combined with violence statistics from Native American women who do not live on reservations. Data sets often combine many different Indigenous nations, so there is not much data on specific communities. This becomes problematic because there are varying levels of violence within each tribe. Data is unknown because no agency collects such information. The data is also further obscured because homeless people are often not included in The National Crime Victimization Survey and Native American people make up a significant portion of the homeless population. The data also suggests that Native American women experience violence by perpetrators who are often not Native which is often met with skepticism by tribes and researchers who see this as data as a major anomaly that distracts from better understanding the issue.

==== Frameworks of Violence ====
The high levels of violence that Indigenous women experience has led to multiple academic frameworks to better understand this phenomenon. Most frameworks account for colonization, white supremacy, and patriarchal norms like sexism, due to the unique history of Native American women as victims of colonial and sexual violence.

===== Globalization =====
Rauna Kuokkanen, a professor of Arctic Indigenous Politics at University of Lapland, argues that globalization is an extension of systems of oppression, such as white supremacy, the patriarchy, and capitalism. Under her intersectional framework that reveals the links between colonization, patriarchy and capitalism, indigenous women face violence due to corporate globalization. These intersecting systems create new forms of violence. In the United States, this sexual and racial violence manifests can manifest as militarization. Indigenous women are increasingly recruited into the army due to the fewer choices they have as a result of the privatization of public services and education under globalization. Entering the military means being exposed to higher levels of sexual violence and the continuation of the United States' collective violence against Native Americans. Incorporation of Native women into the army helps realize the goal of colonial assimilation and using Native women as soldiers to enforce the empire abroad means the United States can reinforce itself as a nation and suppress indigenous sovereignty.

===== Historical oppression =====
Like Kuokkanen's intersectional approach to understanding violence against indigenous women, Catherine Burnette, a professor at Tulane University, explains that the intersection of colonialism, sexism, and racism multiplied to form a system called patriarchal colonialism. This colonization imposed new gender roles that compromised the traditional egalitarian model understood by Native nations. "Conquest, cultural invasion, divide and rule, and manipulation" relegated Native women to a lower status by being stripped of their political and religious power and often being raped and used as sex slaves by colonists. The patriarchal systems of Europeans treated women as subordinate figures, the property of their husbands, so indigenous women became vulnerable to such treatment as colonists began to take control of what is now the United States. Patriarchal colonialism falls under Burnette's larger critical framework of historical oppression defined "the chronic, pervasive, and intergenerational experiences of subjugation that, over time, have been imposed, normalized, and internalized into the daily lives of many indigenous American peoples." Since IPV was likely very rare in Native nations before colonization, an overview of historical violence and oppression is crucial to understanding how this violence has manifested. IPV is the product of larger oppressive systems and historical disruptions that build upon each other. Burnette identifies "experiences of oppression, historical and contemporary losses, cultural disruption, manifestations of oppression, and dehumanizing beliefs and values" as possible reasons for the manifestation of IPV that Native women experience.

==== Types of Violence ====
===== Intimate Partner Violence (IPV) =====
Intimate partner violence (IPV) is one of the most prevalent forms of violence that Native American women experience and includes physical, psychological, and sexual violence perpetrated by a partner or former partner. Indigenous women experience high levels of intimate partner violence in the United States often due to structural violence. This high level of violence concerns Indigenous communities because Indigenous women are considered sacred in traditional matrilineal Native communities. Violence against Native women was extremely uncommon and deemed contrary to indigenous values.

IPV manifests in many forms such as being punched or hit with a hand, being slammed against a wall or a hard surface, being dragged across the floor or room and choked. Many Native American women report injured by their partners. While they are often minor injuries like cuts, major injuries like broken bones, black eyes, or chipped teeth can be common as well. This violence tends to manifest during long-term relationships and is often part of a cycle of abuse in intimate relationships that Native women have experienced since they were children. Higher rates of IPV in Native communities may be correlated with low socioeconomic status. Furthermore, IPV's association with mental illness corresponds to a higher rate of mental health problems, such as PTSD, depression, and substance abuse, anxiety, antisocial behavior, and suicidal thoughts which make Indigenous women even more susceptible to violence. IPV also negatively affects the mental health of children who live in households with IPV. They tend to have lower self-esteem and insecure attachment.

===== Rape =====
Native American women experience the highest per capita rate of rape in the United States. Just like IPV, sexual assault was rare in indigenous communities before colonization. The sexual assault and rape of indigenous women was often used as a method of control and domination by colonizers. The forcible removal and settler expansion of the United States of America was also characterized in sexual term linking the metaphorical raping of the land manifested as the literal raping of Native women. The dehumanization of Native American women through rape may have helped to justify their lower status in colonial society. The rape of Native American women often coincides with violent acts against Native peoples in the United States such as the Trail of Tears and the Gold Rush.

Rape often happens outside of intimate partnerships. Native women can be raped by many different types of people: strangers, friends, neighbors, relatives. Oftentimes, Native women are raped by people who are not Native. This trend differs from other forms of violent crime which are often intraracial in the United States. Rape is often part of an intergenerational cycle of violence. Many women in the community are raped just like their mothers, grandmothers, and other female relatives. Many of these rapists are not prosecuted due to jurisdictional and other legal issues.

===== Missing and murdered Indigenous women and girls =====
Murder is the third leading cause of death for Native American women in the United States as reported by the Center of Disease Control (CDC). In 2016, there were over 5,700 cases of missing Native American and Alaskan Native women and girls by the National Crime Information Center. The Department of Justice's federal missing persons database logged about 2% of these cases or 116 cases. A 2017 study conducted by the Urban Indian Health Institute (UIHI) found 506 MMIWG cases in 71 cities across the United States. Of these 506 cases, 128 were missing Indigenous women, 280 were murdered Indigenous women, 98 were unknown meaning the UIHI could not determine if the Native American girl or woman was dead or found. The ages of the victims ranged from under 1 year old to 83 years old with the median age of the victims being 29 years old. The UIHI also identified 153 cases that are currently not in law enforcement records.

=== Immigrants ===
Immigrants to the US have great difficulties when they try to leave violent relationships. If a perpetrator controls the immigration status, they can then use the threat of deportation to prevent the battered woman from contacting authorities and assistance agencies. Some legislation passed by the US Congress allowed immigrant victims to leave situations of domestic violence. Other proposed policies not yet in effect are designed to stop deportation of immigrants who have experienced domestic violence, sexual assault, and human trafficking.

=== Transgender women ===
Transgender women, especially transgender women of color and sex workers, are at risk of sexual, physical, and emotional violence. Transgender women are more likely to be violently attacked than cisgender women.

== Law ==
=== Violence Against Women Act ===
Then-Vice President Joe Biden, who originally drafted VAWA, speaking about the Act

On September 13, 1994, President Bill Clinton signed into law the Violence Against Women Act (VAWA), which was drafted by Senator Joe Biden (D-DE) and co-written by Democrat Louise Slaughter. The Act granted $1.6 billion of funding for investigating and prosecuting violent crimes directed towards women, making compensation from those convicted automatic and mandatory. VAWA was accepted by Congress with bipartisan support, though House Republicans attempted to cut down on funding in 1995. VAWA created the Office on Violence Against Women, part of the Department of Justice.

In 2005, the American Civil Liberties Union expressed that "VAWA is one of the most effective pieces of legislation enacted to end domestic violence, dating violence, sexual assault, and stalking. It has dramatically improved the law enforcement response to violence against women and has provided critical services necessary to support women in their struggle to overcome abusive situations".

In 2013, the VAWA overturned the Supreme Court cases Oliphant vs. Squamish Indian Tribe of 1978 and Duro v. Reina which allowed intimate partner violence against Native American women by non-Native people to be prosecuted by tribal courts. These new jurisdictional provisions came into effect on March 7, 2015, under Section 904: Tribal Jurisdiction Over Crimes of Domestic Violence and Section 905: Tribal Protection Orders. Section 904 allows tribes to have jurisdiction over non-Natives who have connections to a tribe given that the non-Native lives on federally-recognized tribal land, is employed on tribal land, or is married to or the partner of a Native American. Section 905 provides tribes concurrent jurisdiction with the United States federal government over intimate partner violence.

Since early 2019, the VAWA has not been extended due to political disputes within the United States Congress.

== Sexual misconduct by police ==
Cato ranked sexual misconduct by police officers, or public officials, as the second most prevalent form of police crime. Research shows that most victims of police sexual assault and harassment were women, who in many cases were weak to an officer's authority, such as arrestees, confidential informants, incarcerated people, sex workers, and police investigators (young people who were interested in a career in law enforcement).

== Reactions ==
In 2011, the United Nations Special Rapporteur on Violence against Women, Rashida Manjoo, reported progress in regards to violence towards women in the United States, though she also made recommendations regarding African and Native Americans, immigrants, military personnel, and those who are imprisoned.

== See also ==
- Femicide
- Convention on preventing and combating violence against women and domestic violence
- Compulsory sterilization
- Missing and murdered Indigenous women
- Sexual victimization of Native American women
