= Sexual victimization of Native American women =

Native American women encounter a disproportionate level of sexual violence from verbal abuse to physical harm, including but not limited to domestic and sexual assaults. Such violations not only result in lasting detrimental effects on the individuals subjected to them but also reverberate throughout their entire community, exacerbating social challenges. For example, exposing the removal of their relationships to the land, air, and water that are integral to the ways in which their societies as a whole function. This violence is often seen as being rooted in settler colonialism.

One proposal emphasizes the reinstatement of tribal authority in the prosecution of crimes committed within Indigenous territories, a strategy intended to foster accountability and justice within the community. Advocates are lobbying for legislative amendments to ensure that non-Indigenous men are held responsible under local or national laws.

== History ==
=== Settler colonialism ===
According to Potawatomi philosopher Kyle Powys Whyte, settler colonialism in the Americas provides the historical basis for how violence against Native Women has been perpetuated throughout centuries. Colonizers dehumanized the Native Americans present on the land to justify the exploitation being conducted. This dehumanization is what founded the basis of the colonial systems still present today that are harmful for many Native peoples in the Americas.

According to historian Rayna Green, from the outset of colonization, Native women were viewed as sexual objects that were to be desired. At the same time, Native women could also be seen as women who welcomed settlers and handed Native land over. Green explains that this presents a “Pocahontas Perplex”, where Native women must either act proper according to colonial values, accept colonization and disappear, or give into their base, “savage” nature and act only as sexual objects.

Native Hawaiian women were sexualized in the eyes of European colonizers in similar ways. Native women were idealized and sexualized as exotic and playful. For example, the “hula girl” is always barely clothed, wrapped in leaves, and in an idealized physical shape. These visualizations bring about higher rates of sexualization, assault, and trafficking.

Alaska Natives were also viewed under similar sexualization and they now see the highest rates of sexual assault in the country. Alaska Native peoples were forcibly removed from their homelands in the mid 1900s and are still facing colonialism as they fight for land claims with the US federal and state government.

The exoticness placed on the image of the Native Woman through these imagined stereotypes aided in the justification of abuses inflicted by the Europeans in early settler colonialism. The enslavement and exploitation of the native body reflected their low placement on an imagined hierarchy.

In the 1800’s, boarding schools were created around the United States for Native children to be sent to learn how to be “a good American citizen”. The lack of regulation at these schools allowed for overseers to abuse, molest, and rape children, both male and female. Sexual abuse was conducted under penalties such as torture or death if children refused. This system continued a cycle of assault that these schools allowed to persist.

=== Resource extraction and environmental injustice ===
Native reservations are often targeted for mining projects due to the abundance of resources like oil and gas that are present in those areas. This invasion has led to many battles with the US government to maintain the sovereignty of these nations as pipeline projects encroach on their lands. With an estimated 20% of oil and gas repositories lying beneath reservations, these areas are at increasing risk for environmental damage and pollution due to mining and fracking projects on or next to reservations.

For Native American women, these pipelines brought pollution to their and high risks of sexual assault and rape. Oil and gas companies depend on “man camps” that allow anyone to come work on the pipeline projects with limited background checks. Native lands located close to man camps have much higher rates of abuse, sexual assault, and rape. For example, according to studies done by the Tallgrass institute, trafficking, murder and rape increase by at least 23% during times of oil booms and that 96% of these violences are committed by non-native individuals.

Throughout the late 20th century till now, Alaska Natives have had to battle oil and gas companies for the rights to their land due to the large number of fossil fuel repositories in Alaska. The large amounts of man camps coupled with the vastly unregulated “Alaskan wilderness” amount to a higher rates of violent assaults on Native Alaskan women than any other Native group in the US.

=== Native efforts to resist sexual violence ===
Many indigenous women and activists created groups and organizations to combat these issues. Tribal members have been calling for control of rape kits, traditional ways of medicine for the health-related issues caused by sexual assault, and counseling services that are integrated in the spiritual and medicinal way of life that is ingrained in their societies. They believe that this is one way that tribes can take this issue back into their hands if the US government will not bring assault cases to Federal courts or establish Tribal rights to prosecute non-Tribal citizens.

Muscogee Creek law scholar Sarah Deer discusses many ways in which tribal governments work with their communities for aid due to a lack of help from the United States. She calls for activism, reform, and justice for the victims of sexual violence.

== Institutional reports and statistics ==
=== Amnesty International's "Maze of Injustice" Report ===
Amnesty International, in its report "Maze of Injustice: The failure to protect indigenous women from sexual violence in the USA", presented survivors' voices of sexual violence. This research, conducted in 2005 and 2006 across the Standing Rock Sioux Reservation, Oklahoma, and Alaska, involved interviews with victims, tribal, state, and federal law enforcement officials, prosecutors, and tribal judges. The report highlighted the widespread fear among Indigenous women that their assaults would go unaddressed, leading to low reporting rates.

Pursuing justice for these women often means navigating a maze of tribal, state, and federal law, where jurisdictional queries delay or even prevent cases from being heard. The report identifies several factors contributing to these injustices, including lack of training and inadequate response by police officers, underfunding of justice systems, federal restrictions on tribal courts' authority, and systemic discrimination. The 1978 Oliphant v. Suquamish case, which prohibits tribal courts from prosecuting non-Native suspects, further complicates the matter.

=== National Institute of Justice research report ===
A 2016 report released by the National Institute of Justice, collected data from 3,978 Native American and Alaska Natives (2,473 women and 1,505 men), and found that more than half of the surveyed women had experienced sexual violence at some point. Specifically, 56.1% reported experiencing sexual violence during their lifetime, and 14.4% had experienced such violence in the year preceding the survey. The report also indicated high rates of domestic violence perpetrated by intimate partners, with 55.5% of female respondents reporting having experienced this form of violence in their lifetime. In the year before the survey, 8.6% of women reported having been victims of intimate partner violence.

=== National Intimate Partner and Sexual Violence Survey (NISVS) ===
Findings from the National Intimate Partner and Sexual Violence Survey (NISVS) highlight the violence experienced by Native American and Alaska Native adults. The reported figures reveal that 83 percent of these individuals, or almost 3 million people, have experienced some form of violence in their lifetime. This violence ranges from psychological aggression to physical violence by intimate partners, stalking, or sexual violence. Both women and men in these communities are victimized at similar rates, with rates of 84.3 percent for women and 81.6 percent for men. However, women experience significantly higher rates of sexual violence and stalking compared to men.

In terms of lifetime victimization, Native American and Alaska Native women experience 1.2 times as much victimization as Caucasian women, while men from these communities experience victimization at a rate 1.3 times higher than Caucasian men. More than two in five Native American and Alaska Native female victims reported physical injuries because of this violence, and almost half needed services, most commonly medical care and legal services. More than a third were unable to receive these services. Most victims of violence experienced at least one act of violence committed by someone of a different race. This rate is 97 percent for women and 90 percent for men, while fewer victims experienced violence by an Native American or Alaska Native. This supports the call for the sovereign right of federally recognized tribes to prosecute non-Indian individuals for crimes committed on tribal lands, a right that had been denied until recently.

== Federal efforts ==
=== The Tribal Sexual Assault Services Program ===
The Tribal Sexual Assault Services Program (TSASP), managed by the U.S. Department of Justice, is an initiative to improve and expand services for victims of sexual assault within tribal communities. The scope of the program is quite broad, covering both Indian Country and Alaska Native villages. TSASP projects are designed to provide direct services to victims of sexual assault, such as crisis intervention, accompaniment through medical and legal proceedings, counseling, and other supportive services. The program also aims to enhance the ability of tribes, tribal organizations, and nonprofit tribal organizations to respond to the needs of sexual assault victims effectively and sensitively.

Funding from the program can also be used for developing and enhancing culturally appropriate and trauma-informed strategies and services. The aim is not only to provide immediate assistance to victims but also to create a systemic change within the tribal communities to better address sexual assault and its aftermath. In addition to direct services, TSASP promotes coordination among tribal, federal, and state law enforcement agencies and prosecutors to ensure an effective response to sexual assault incidents within tribal jurisdiction. The ultimate goal of the program is to reduce the prevalence of sexual violence within tribal communities and to improve access to justice and healing services for victims.

=== U.S. Department of Justice report ===
In response to the levels of domestic violence, sexual assault, and stalking experienced by Native American women, the U.S. Department of Justice (DOJ) has initiated several measures to enhance the federal response to crimes of sexual violence and support tribal efforts to ensure the safety of Native women.

A 2004 DOJ report that used data from 1992-2002, found that people indigenous to the Americas ages 12 and older experience 5,900 sexual assaults per year. The report also found that Native peoples in the United States are twice as likely to experience rape/sexual assault compared to all other races.

Almost half of all Native American women have experienced rape, physical violence, or stalking by an intimate partner, and one in three Indian women will experience the trauma of rape at some point in her life. Additionally, the murder rate of Native American women on some reservations exceeds the national average by over ten times. To combat this trend, the DOJ launched an initiative on public safety in tribal communities, directed U.S. Attorneys to prioritize violence against women in Indian Country, and added 28 new Indian Country Assistant U.S. Attorneys in 2010 to increase the prosecution of serious crimes.

A Violence Against Women Federal/Tribal Prosecution Task Force was established to assist in the development of best practice recommendations and resource materials concerning the prosecution of violence against women crimes in Indian Country. The Office on Violence Against Women (OVW) created a national clearinghouse on the sexual assault of Native women and implemented the SAFESTAR Project to address the collection and preservation of sexual assault evidence in rural and geographically isolated tribal communities.

The Office for Victims of Crime (OVC) supports efforts to enhance American Indian and Alaska Native communities' capacity to provide services for victims of sexual assault through the Sexual Assault Nurse Examiner–Sexual Assault Response Team (SANE-SART) Initiative. To assist in providing accurate data for Indian tribal governments, OVW released a solicitation for the National Tribal Protection Order Registry Initiative. The OVW also announced the selection of four tribes for a Violence Against Women Tribal Special U.S. Attorney (SAUSA) Initiative, which aims to increase the likelihood that every viable violence against women criminal offense is prosecuted.

Recognizing the complexities of the legal framework for criminal jurisdiction in Indian country, the DOJ has formally recommended new Federal legislation to better protect women in tribal communities from violent crime. Proposed amendments to the Violence Against Women Act (VAWA) include reaffirming tribal criminal jurisdiction over certain non-Indian offenders and clarifying tribal civil authority to issue and enforce protection orders. In partnership with tribal governments, the OVW continues to work towards decreasing violence against Native American women, strengthening the capacity of tribal governments to respond to these crimes, and ensuring the accountability of perpetrators.

== Organizations ==
Organizations dedicated to addressing sexual victimization as well as gender-based violence against Native Americans include:

- The National Indigenous Women's Resource Center (NIWRC) is a Native-led nonprofit organization dedicated to ending violence against Native women and children.
- Women of All Red Nations (WARN) is an activist group dedicated to issues that affect Native American women. WARN was founded in 1974.
- Mending the Sacred Hoop is a Native American non-profit organization that addresses issues related to violence against Native American women. Much of this violence includes sexual victimization.

== Racism and sexual assault ==
Racial hatred has been identified as an important factor in the high levels of sexual violence experience by American Indian and Alaska native women. Research found that native women are sexually assaulted more than women in the general U.S. population. The report estimates that 34.1% of Alaska and native women were sexually assaulted. One out of three women will be raped at some point in their lives, Compared to the national statistic of one in five women in the U.S.

According to research by the center for public integrity, the perpetrators of sexual assaults or rapes against Native women, indigenous Alaskan women are most often white male. One reason for this is that they can get away with it. Since the tribal leaders or police cannot charge a crime on Indian territory many of cases are sent to the FBI, attorney's office and prosecutors declined to prosecute these cases.

There is an increase of reported cases in Montana and North Dakota where Bakken oil workers are coming for work.

== Underreporting of sexual assault ==
When victims attempt to report rape or sexual assault, they can be repeatedly shamed after their assault by police. The victim is asked multiple times, are you sure and you will get in trouble for making a false claim. Police can maintain an aggressive, hostile attitude toward victims of sexual assault, especially towards indigenous women. Most likely the police will call the report "unfounded".

According to the National Sexual Violence Research Center 2018 report in general 40% of rapes and sexual assaults were reported to police In 2017, and only 25% were reported to the police in 2018.

There are several documented cases of Native American women who reported being raped and pressured by the police to change their stories, that they ultimately changed their stories and said they lied.

Even with strong physical evidence of being physically injured by the attacker, the police dismissed, would not investigate, and did not arrest the men, but ultimately arrested the victim.

Another factor of underreported sexual assault would be that alcohol and drug use may have been involved and the victim didn't want to report due to a possibility of being arrested on drug charges or reported for underage drinking.

== Factors and causes ==
Colonization and genocide has left the Native American population decimated. The war of violence continues against the Native American women and Alaska Native, and Canadian Native women. Sexual assault occurs in greater numbers against black women and Native American women. Significant number of missing and murdered indigenous cases remains unsolved after decades. Databases are local and not fully connected throughout the United States. State records can be years old, and states do not share the statistics on a federal level.

Several factors add to the disparity of the number of Indigenous missing, sexually assaulted or murdered. Many of these women are in significantly rural areas. They live on a remote reservation or in a community and whose jurisdiction falls between federal and tribal jurisdiction. Frequently the cases are not prosecuted due to the uncertainty of what court shall handle the case. The tribes and tribal court do not want to give up their sovereignty, and let the FBI manage their affairs. Since many times, the FBI, government officials and U.S. military routinely stomped on their treaties and rights for centuries. Sexual assault and rape were and still are forms of control, and brutal humiliation against vulnerable women. There is a built and systemic dismissal of reported sexual assaults, and rapes.

Decades of distrust, racism, language barriers, cultural barriers and hatred have taken a significant toll on the Native American women.

There is a significant lack of comprehensive data regarding the number of Indigenous women trafficked across state lines or subjected to forced sexual exploitation. The absence of a unified database across the United States and Canada complicates efforts to track and address this phenomenon systematically.

== States with highest amount of Missing and Murdered Indigenous Women ==
According to The FBI special report titled, "Violence Against American Indian or Alaska Native females, 2021-2023 Special Report" 8,575 incidents occurred against American and Alaska Native women.

Montana: Because of the migration of Oil workers in Montana for work, sexual assaults in Montana have been noted to have increased in an exponential fashion.

North Dakota: In 2025 of 1,389 missing person cases 14 are Native American women. Also due to migration of Baakan oil workers in North Dakota, a higher number of assaults have been reported.

Savanna La Fontaine-Greywind was murdered in August 2017, and a bill called Savanna's bill was introduced for the reform of law enforcement and justice protocol.

Wyoming: In 2025 of 151 missing persons,105 were Indigenous,19% of state's missing person cases are Indigenous, 66% were Indigenous women, 85% of all missing indigenous was reported in Fremont County, and 50% were from Wind River Indian Reservation.

== See also ==
- Custer's Revenge
- INCITE! Women of Color Against Violence
- Indian country jurisdiction
- Indigenous feminism
- Missing and Murdered Indigenous Women (Canada)
- Native American feminism
- Índia pega no laço
- Sterilization of Native American women
- Rape in the United States
- Navajo reservations and domestic abuse
- Prostitution on Native American Reservations in North America
- Bad men clause
- Indigenous women in the conquest of Paraguay

Victims:

- Faith Hedgepeth homicide
- Murder of Susan Poupart
- Murder of Kathleen Jo Henry
