= Jonas Michaelius =

Dutch Reformed Church clergyman

Jonas Michaëlius (1576 – after 1638) was the first clergyman to lead a congregation of the Dutch Reformed Church in America.

== Biography ==
He was probably born Jonas Joannis Michielsz in Hoorn. He studied at the University of Leyden from 1600-1605, and worked as a clergyman in various towns in Brabant from 1607-1612, from 1612-14 in "Nieuwbokswoude" (modern Nibbixwoud), and from 1614-1624 in Hem. He married in 1614. In 1624 he traveled, presumably with the fleet of Piet Hein, to Salvador, Brazil, where he served until the town was recaptured by the Portuguese in May 1625. From there he crossed the Atlantic to Guinea where he stayed until 1627. After briefly returning to the Netherlands, he went to New Amsterdam in January 1628, and was thus the first minister of the Dutch Reformed Church in what would become the United States. He organized a consistory, and administered the sacraments, but returned to Holland in a few years, probably before the arrival of his successor, Everardus Bogardus, in 1633.

Michaëlius' wife died in New Amsterdam shortly after his arrival. The classis of Amsterdam wished to send Michaëlius back to America in 1637, but he did not return owing to political opposition from New Amsterdam.

It was long supposed that Bogardus was the first Reformed Church clergyman in the future United States, but the precedence of Michaëlius was established by a letter from him to Adrian Smoutius, dated New Amsterdam, 11 August 1628, which was found in the late 19th century in the Dutch archives at The Hague. In this letter he describes the degraded state of the natives, and proposes to educate their children without trying to redeem the parents. The letter is printed in an appendix to Mary L. Booth's History of the City of New York (New York, 1859).

== See also ==
- Collegiate School (New York)
