= Sovereignty (play) =

Play by Mary Kathryn Nagle

Sovereignty is a play written by American lawyer and playwright Mary Kathryn Nagle. The play revolves around Cherokee lawyer Sarah Ridge Polson's battle to reinstate the Cherokee Nation's sovereignty and jurisdiction. She also must face the ghosts of her ancestors and the struggles they faced when signing a decisive treaty that led to the removal of the Nation from their land.

== Original production ==
The original production was directed by American director Molly Smith. The play premiered through Arena Stage at the Kreeger Theater in Washington, D.C., on January 12, 2018, running until February 18, 2018. A print edition of the play was published by Northwestern University Press in 2020.

=== Original cast ===
- Joseph Carlson: Andrew Jackson / Ben
- Kyla García: Sarah Polson
- Michael Glenn: Samuel Worcester / Mitch
- Jake Hart: Elias Boudinot / Watie
- Kalani Queypo: John Ridge
- Andrew Roa: Major Ridge / Rodger Ridge Polson
- Dorea Schmidt: Sarah Bird Northrup / Flora Ridge / Offstage Woman's Voice
- Todd Scofield: White Chorus Man
- Jake Waid: John Ross / Jim Ross

== Historical background ==
Sovereignty alternates between the 1830s and present-day America. The present-day story follows Polson and her return to the Cherokee Nation to help Native American women who have been sexually harassed through the Violence Against Women Act. The only issue is that Polson is a descendant of the Ridge family, the infamous Cherokee family who signed the Treaty of New Echota which transferred Cherokee land to the United States for the state of Georgia. The treaty led to the relocation of the Cherokee people in the land to Oklahoma, contributing to what is known as the Trail of Tears. Polson's family members are buried in a family cemetery in the Oklahoma reservation.

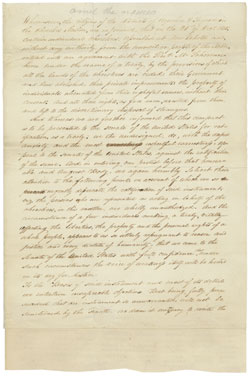
The Cherokee who did not support the New Echota Treaty sent this petition to the Senate in 1836.

The Treaty of New Echota, the treaty which the Ridges signed, was signed on December 29, 1835. The treaty ceded all Cherokee lands east of the Mississippi River to the United States and promised a perpetual opportunity of expansion for the Nation west. The signing of the treaty was controversial within the Cherokee Nation, as people were both in favor and opposition of the treaty. Major Ridge and his son, John Ridge, were members of what was known as the "Treaty Party," which was the group of Cherokees who saw the removal from their land as inevitable and believed they should negotiate and cooperate. Other Cherokee members were vehemently opposed to the signing because they did not want to leave their land. This polarized climate is a major detail in the familial context of the lawyer, Sarah Polson, in the play. Due to the conflict over the treaty, Cherokee tribesmen assassinated Major and John Ridge in 1839 as a form of political retribution.

=== Character history ===
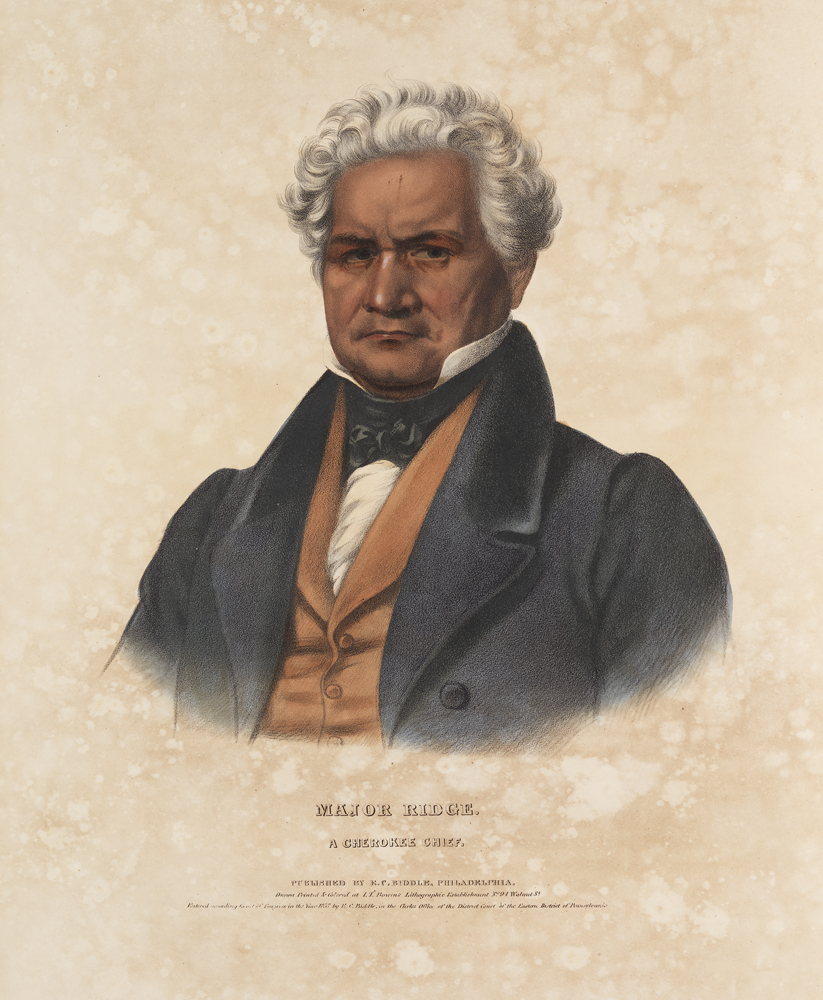
Cherokee Chief Major Ridge

John Ridge, also referred to as Skah-tle-loh-skee, was part of an influential family in the Cherokee Nation. Through the "Treaty Party," acknowledging that Indian Removal was imminent, he supported the creation of a treaty with the United States, which would include the protection of Cherokee rights. He and other members of the party were opposed by Principal Chief John Ross. After the signing of the treaty, in 1836, the Ridge family relocated to the Indian Territory (present-day Oklahoma), two years prior to the forced removal of the majority of the Cherokees. On June 22, 1839, pro-Ross Cherokees attacked the signers of the treaty; stabbing John Ridge 48 times in front of his wife and children.

Major Ridge, father of John Ridge, also participated in the polarizing signing of the Treaty of New Echota. He grew up as a traditional hunter and Indian warrior, fighting against the American occupation of the Cherokee Nation. He then established, alongside his friend John Ross, a three-part Cherokee government, serving as a counselor, in 1827. When choosing to promote the treaty, he and Ross were divided by their beliefs, each siding with opposite sides of the controversy. Major too moved to the Indian Territory with John Ridge and their family following the completion of the treaty. On June 22, 1839, Major was assassinated in retribution for signing the treaty, while on his way to his plantation in the Indian Territory.

John Ross, Principal Chief of the Cherokee Nation from 1828 to 1866, was initially close with Ridges prior to the treaty. Under his leadership and working alongside Major Ridge in the National Council of the Cherokee he convinced the Cherokees to begin changing their economy from hunting to agriculture, starting up plantations and owning slaves. The split between the Cherokee Nation began when Ross refused to sign the treaty, leading to his arrest without charge. While being detained, Major Ridge and the Treaty Party signed the Treaty of New Echota, ceding their lands to the United States.

=== Playwright ===
Mary Kathryn Nagle completed her undergraduate education at Georgetown University and later received her Juris Doctor from Tulane Law School. She is currently the Executive Director of Yale's Indigenous Performing Arts Program as well as a lawyer and partner of Pipesterm Law firm, specializing in Native Americans' and their Nations' rights and freedoms. Nagle has stated that her background as a lawyer has provided her with knowledge of the harmful narratives created about Native Americans in American law and society. She said arguing for the rights of her people has led her to realize that in order for change to be made, people need to know the story of the Native American peoples and their experiences—that is where theatre plays into her goal of spreading awareness of Native American issues.

== Major themes ==
=== Double meaning ===
The play's title of "sovereignty" can relate to larger issues pertaining to the term as they are presented within various Native American causes. One meaning of the term within the play's context is the sovereignty of Native Americans reclaiming their voice in historical interpretations of their peoples. Such a theme is represented through the medium of telling a story through performance itself, perpetuating the tradition of oral history. The notion of reclaiming historical voice is also represented through the play's casting, with all Native American characters being played by actors and actresses of Native American descent. The term additionally relates to the struggle of sovereignty Native American women may face when seeking agency over their bodies in the face of sexual assault and rape, which they are twice as likely to experience when compared to other races.

=== Past affecting present ===
The plot's transitions between past and present serve to reveal how past, historical actions inflict influence on the present day. Depicting descendants from major Native American historical figures additionally proves the dynamics between ancestral and current descendants, shaping past, present, and future actions. Past affecting present could additionally serve as a cause for Native American marginalization and issues within reservations. Native Americans in the United States are more than twice as likely to experience post-traumatic stress disorder when compared to the rest of the population. Native American demographics also have a life expectancy lowered by six years in comparison to the general U.S. population, as well as possess a doubled chance of living in poverty.

=== Healing and forgiveness ===
While the play may assert ideas of sovereignty and belonging within the scope of several meanings, it also addresses the concept of moving on. Such concepts are brought to light with the element of past affecting present. Kyla Garcia states how Native American and white populations must face the past, allowing one group to begin healing and the latter to understand forgiveness within the particular context. Commencing this process, according to the actress, would allow all parties to create a future with improved relations—rather than avoiding, ignoring or rewriting the past altogether. The actress additionally addresses Germany's actions to remember their faults executed during the Holocaust as an example of being hyper aware of damages made and taking steps to commence the process of healing and forgiveness.

== Criticism and interpretation ==
The play has received critique on the fluidity of the transition from past to present, and vice versa. Although a major theme of the play is the intersection of the past and present, the change is not always clear enough for the audience to pinpoint what characters are being portrayed. Despite these issues, many have applauded the play's ability to teach about legal matters while also entertaining the audience.

Gloria Steinem has also offered her opinion, stating that the play reveals the extent of current democracy, and information about people's human rights. Steinem praises the show's ability to educate audiences and provoke consciousness of the American people on what they should vote for.
