= Moissaye Marans =

American sculptor

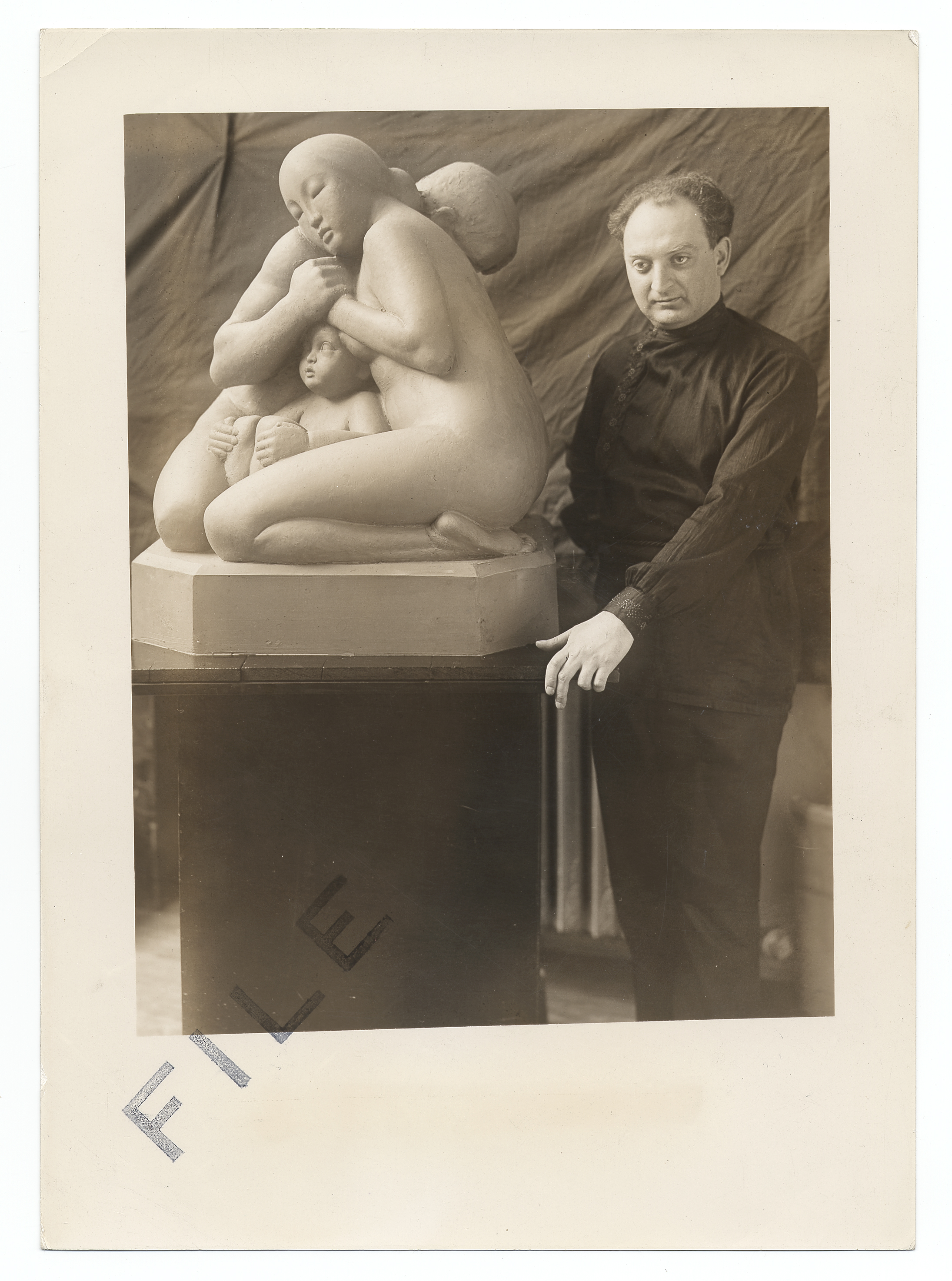
- Moissaye Marans, from the Archives of American Art
- Born: 1902; Kishinev, Russian Empire
- Died: 1977 (aged 74–75); New York City
- Known for: Sculpture, Painting

Moissaye Marans (October 11, 1902 – 18 December, 1977) was an American sculptor.

== Life ==
Marans immigrated in 1924. He was a member of the Federal Art Project. He taught at Brooklyn College.

His sculpture Isaiah is located at the Community Church in New York City. His sculpture of Carl Linnaeus is located in the Brooklyn Botanic Garden. He work is held by the San Jose Museum of Art, and Smithsonian American Art Museum. His papers are held by Syracuse University, and the Archives of American Art.
