= Mary Kathryn Nagle =

American dramatist

- Born: Oklahoma City, Oklahoma
- Education: Georgetown University, Tulane University
- Occupations: Lawyer, Playwright

Mary Kathryn Nagle is a playwright and an attorney specializing in tribal sovereignty of Native nations and peoples. She was born in Oklahoma City, and is an enrolled citizen of the Cherokee Nation of Oklahoma. She previously served as the executive director of the Yale Indigenous Performing Arts Program (YIPAP) from 2015 to 2019. For her play, Manahatta, she was nominated for the 2024 Outer Critics Circle John Gassner Award for Playwriting.

== Education and career ==
Mary Kathryn Nagle received her bachelor's degree in Justice and Peace Studies from Georgetown University, and later received her degree in law from Tulane University Law School where she graduated summa cum laude. After graduating from law school, Nagle clerked for two federal judges at once in the United States District Court for the District of Nebraska, Senior Judge Joseph Bataillon, and Chief Judge Laurie Smith Camp. The majority of her work in court involves fighting for the rights of Native people on and off of reservations. One of the most prominent cases she litigated was Adoptive Couple v Baby Girl (also known as the Baby Veronica case) trial in 2013, held in the US Supreme Court. She wrote a brief which cited the ICWA (Indian Child Welfare Act) to keep a young Native girl from being taken away from her birth-father and being adopted by a white family. It was during law school that Nagle realized she wanted to advocate for Native rights as a playwright.

Nagle is an alumna of the 2013 Emerging Writers Group, a prestigious program supported by The Public Theater for up-and-coming playwrights. During her time in the Emerging Writers Group she wrote Manahatta, a play that received recognition from the groups that give the William Soroyan Prize for Playwriting and the Jane Chambers Playwriting Award. Sliver of a Full Moon is one of her most successful works to date, having been performed at the Church Center of the United Nations and various law schools across the country, including Yale, Harvard, NYU, and Stanford. After being commissioned by the Arena Stage to write Sovereignty, she became the first Native American playwright to ever have their work featured in the venue. Northwestern University Press will publish Sovereignty in 2020.

== Family ==
Nagle's grandmother, Frances Polson, was a Cherokee woman, and her grandfather, Dr. Patrick Sarsfield Nagle II, was an Irish man and the son of the leader of the Oklahoma Socialist Party. The couple were forced to elope from Oklahoma to Iowa because Patrick's family opposed the marriage.

Her great-great-great grandfather was John Ridge, a Cherokee politician. Ridge's father, Major Ridge (Nagle's great-great-great-great grandfather), was also a Cherokee politician. They were both involved with the drafting of treaties with the United States in an attempt to protect Cherokee rights in the era of Indian removal.

Her sister is the activist and writer Rebecca Nagle.

== Plays ==
- Katrina Stories (2008)
- Welcome to Chalmette (2008)
- Waaxe's Law (2009)
- To the 7th Degree (2009)
- Manahatta (2023) – a young Native American woman with a degree in Financial Mathematics from MIT rediscovers the history of her homeland, Manahatta.
- Sliver of a Full Moon (2013) – a group of survivors of domestic violence on Indian reservations tell their stories about how jurisdiction laws have impacted them, while an effort to re-authorize the Violence Against Women Act (VAWA) is pushed in congress.
- Miss Lead (2013) – a young Native American woman discovers and must acknowledge she has lead poisoning.
- Fairly Traceable (2013) – set in the aftermath of Hurricanes Katrina and Rita, two young Native American law school students grapple with career ambitions, rights of native communities, and environmental welfare. Staged in March 2017 in the Autry Museum of the American West "Native Voices" series.
- In My Father's Eyes (2013–14)
- My Father's Bones (2013–14) – the children of Jim Thorpe, Olympic gold medalist and member of the Sac and Fox Nation, attempt to repatriate their father's remains.
- Diamonds... Are a Boy's Best Friend (2013–14)
- Sovereignty (2015) – young Cherokee lawyer Sarah Ridge Polson returns to Oklahoma in order to help restore her Nation's tribal jurisdiction.
- Crossing Mnisose (2017)
- Reclaiming One Star (2020)
- On the Far End (2023)

== Awards and nominations ==
Year	Award	Category	Work	Result	Ref.
2024	Outer Critics Circle Award	John Gassner Award	Manahatta	Nominated	
