= National Indigenous Women's Resource Center =

U.S. nonprofit organization

- Formation: 2011
- Tax ID no.: 27-4971660
- Headquarters: Lame Deer, Montana
- Executive Director: Lucy Rain Simpson
- Board Chair: Carmen O’Leary
- Revenue: $3.2 m USD (2019)
- Staff: 20 FTEs (2023)
- Website: niwrc.org

The National Indigenous Women's Resource Center (NIWRC) is a nonprofit organization that provides health resources to Native American women and also advocates for women's health, housing, and domestic violence support. The organization was founded and is led by Native American women.

== Background ==
Founded in 2011, NIWRC is dedicated to ending gender-based violence directed at Native American women through grassroots advocacy. Their mission is to "provide national leadership to end violence against American Indian, Alaska Native and Native Hawaiian women by supporting culturally grounded, grassroots advocacy." The organization received 501(c)(3) nonprofit status in 2011.

NIWRC is a member of the Domestic Violence Resource Network and has received funding from the United States Department of Health and Human Services. The organization is headquartered in Lame Deer, Montana.

=== Activities ===
NIWRC leads awareness month/day campaigns, policy advocacy, resource outreach events, and on-site technical assistance events serving tribal communities. They also host online webinars and have supported women's resource advocates and professionals across over 160 tribal areas and communities. NIWRC has also published pamphlets and booklets focused on the safety of Native American women, including Restoration Magazine and the Toolkit for Understanding and Responding to Missing and Murdered Indigenous Women for Families and Communities.

NIWRC leads a VAWA Sovereignty Initiative which describes its work as "defending the constitutionality and functionality of all tribal provisions in the Violence Against Women Act, as well as the inherent authority of Indian Nations to protect Native women." The organization also operates the STTARS Indigenous Safe Housing Center which supports victims of gender-based violence.

NIWRC also sponsors an annual "Women Are Sacred" conference which brings together leaders, advocates, and other experts in the movement to end violence against Indigenous women.

In 2018, NIWRC filed an Amicus curiae brief in the U.S. Supreme Court case Sharp v. Murphy.
