= Indian country =

Self-governing Native American community in the United States

- Also known as: Domestic dependent nations
- Category: Political divisions
- Location: United States
- Number: 575 federally recognized tribes, 326 Indian reservations, 229 Alaska Native tribal entities (as of 2025)
- Government: Federally recognized tribe, State recognized tribe
- Subdivisions: Indian reservation

Indian country is any of the self-governing Native American or American Indian communities throughout the United States. Colloquially, this refers to lands governed by federally recognized tribes and state recognized tribes. The concept of tribal sovereignty legally recognizes tribes as distinct, independent nations within the United States. As a legal category, it includes "all land within the limits of any Indian reservation", "all dependent Indian communities within the borders of the United States", and "all Indian allotments, the Indian titles to which have not been extinguished." Native tribes which are not recognized by the government can seek recognition. Multiple tribes that had their relationship with the federal government terminated have not regained federal recognition.

The American military has since applied the term to sovereign land outside its control, including land in Vietnam.

== Legal classification ==
This legal classification defines American Indian tribal and individual land holdings as part of a reservation, dependent Indian community, an allotment, or a public domain allotment:

Except as otherwise provided in sections 1154 and 1156 of this title, the term “Indian country”, as used in this chapter, means
(a) all land within the limits of any Indian reservation under the jurisdiction of the United States Government, notwithstanding the issuance of any patent, and, including rights-of-way running through the reservation,
(b) all dependent Indian communities within the borders of the United States whether within the original or subsequently acquired territory thereof, and whether within or without the limits of a state, and
(c) all Indian allotments, the Indian titles to which have not been extinguished, including rights-of-way running through the same.

All federal trust lands held for Native American tribes are Indian country. Federal, state, and local governments use this category in their legal processes. Today, however, according to the U.S. Census of 2010, over 78% of all Native Americans live off reservations. Indian country now spans thousands of rural areas, towns and cities where Indian people live. This convention is followed generally in colloquial speech and is reflected in publications such as the Native American newspaper Indian Country Today.

== Related and historical meanings ==
Historically, Indian country was considered the areas, regions, territories or countries beyond the frontier of settlement that were inhabited primarily by Native Americans. Colonists made treaties with Native Americans, agreeing to offer services and protection indefinitely in exchange for peaceful transfer of Native American land. Many of these treaties were arranged and signed through coercion, and many treaty agreements were violated or ignored.

=== Between the Appalachians and Mississippi ===
As the original 13 colonies grew and treaties were made, the de facto boundary between settled territory and Indian country during the 18th century was roughly the crest of the Appalachian Mountains, a boundary set into law by the Royal Proclamation of 1763, the Confederation Congress Proclamation of 1783, and later by the Nonintercourse Act. The Indian Reserve was gradually settled by European Americans and divided into territories and states, starting with Kentucky County (an extension of Virginia) and the Northwest Territory.

=== West of the Mississippi ===
Most Indians in the area of the former Reserve were either killed or relocated further west under policies of Indian Removal. After the Louisiana Purchase, the Indian Intercourse Act of 1834 created the Indian Territory west of the Mississippi River as a destination. It too was gradually divided into territories and states for European American settlement, leaving only modern Indian Reservations inside the boundaries of U.S. states.

In 2020, the United States Supreme Court ruled in McGirt v. Oklahoma that the tribal statistical area (and former reservation) of the Muscogee (Creek) Nation remains under the tribal sovereignty of the Muscogee (Creek) Nation for the purposes of the Major Crimes Act.

=== American military usage ===
==== Vietnam War ====
During the Vietnam War circa 1968, the American military and pilots referred to free-fire zones under South Vietnamese control as "Indian Country." American military personnel also used the term "savage" and "uncivilized" to refer to its inhabitants.

During a 1971 congressional hearing, American airborne ranger Robert Bowie Johnson Jr. defined the term to politician John F. Seiberling:

...it means different things to different people. It is like there are savages out there, there are gooks out there. In the same way we slaughtered the Indian's buffalo, we would slaughter the water buffalo in Vietnam.

In 1989, Tom Holm claimed Vietnam War usage of this term was "in obvious mimicry of the old Cavalry versus Indian films".

==== Iraq and Afghanistan ====
The term is used by "soldiers, military strategists, reporters, and World Wide Web users to refer to hostile, unsecured, and dangerous territory in Iraq and Afghanistan."

== See also ==
- Aboriginal title in the United States
- Indian country jurisdiction
- Native American reservation politics
- Off-reservation trust land
- Oklahoma Tribal Statistical Area
- Tribal sovereignty in the United States
- Land Buy-Back Program for Tribal Nations
