= Oklahoma v. Castro-Huerta =

- Supreme Court of the United States

Argued April 27, 2022 Decided June 29, 2022
- Full case name: Oklahoma v. Victor Manuel Castro-Huerta
- Docket no.: 21-429
- Citations: 597 U.S. 629 (more) 2022 WL 2334307; 2022 U.S. LEXIS 3222
- Argument: Oral argument

Holding
- The Federal Government and the State have concurrent jurisdiction to prosecute crimes committed by non-Indians against Indians in Indian country.

Court membership
- Chief Justice John Roberts Associate Justices Clarence Thomas · Stephen Breyer; Samuel Alito · Sonia Sotomayor; Elena Kagan · Neil Gorsuch; Brett Kavanaugh · Amy Coney Barrett

Case opinions
- Majority: Kavanaugh, joined by Roberts, Thomas, Alito, Barrett
- Dissent: Gorsuch, joined by Breyer, Sotomayor, Kagan

Laws applied
- General Crimes Act

Oklahoma v. Castro-Huerta, 597 U.S. 629 (2022), was a United States Supreme Court case related to McGirt v. Oklahoma, decided in 2020. In McGirt, the Supreme Court ruled that the U.S. Congress never properly disestablished the Indian reservations of the Five Civilized Tribes in Oklahoma when granting its statehood, and thus almost half the state was still considered to be Native American land. As a result of McGirt, crimes under the Major Crimes Act by Native Americans in the reservations are treated as federal crimes rather than state crimes.

In the wake of McGirt, the Oklahoma state courts started vacating past criminal cases to turn them over to federal courts. However, the Oklahoma Court of Criminal Appeals ruled that this would include crimes where the defendant was not a Native American but still occurred against Native Americans on Native American lands. The Supreme Court agreed to hear the state's challenge to this rule, but only to investigate the issues of breadth of McGirt, refusing to review McGirt itself. In the 5–4 ruling issued on June 29, 2022, the Court ruled that both federal and state authorities held joint jurisdiction to prosecute non-Native Americans for crimes on native lands.

== Background ==
In McGirt v. Oklahoma (2020), the Supreme Court of the United States held by a 5–4 vote that the Muscogee (Creek) Nation's reservation (and by extension, five other reservations) in eastern Oklahoma had not been disestablished by Congress when Oklahoma gained statehood over 100 years prior. Consequently, Oklahoma was no longer able to prosecute Indians for crimes committed in what is now recognized as Indian country. The question of whether Oklahoma could continue to prosecute non-Indians if the victims of their crimes were Native American and the crimes were committed in reservation lands was an unsettled issue. Oklahoma state courts had come to rule in favor of considering these crimes to fall within tribal and federal oversight and out of state oversight. The state claimed that tribal and federal law enforcement officials did not have the capacity to handle the number of crimes in considering this authority aspect; while the state authorities may hand over such crimes to federal and tribal ones, many of these remain unprosecuted, according to an FBI agent working in Oklahoma. The state feared an increase in the rate of crime due to the lack of capacity to enforce the law from the tribal and federal site. The state further was concerned that federal courts were more lenient than state courts.

Over the course of 2021, Oklahoma attempted to have the Supreme Court reconsider McGirt. In May, over the dissents of three justices, the Supreme Court stayed the Oklahoma Court of Criminal Appeals' mandate in the case of Shaun Michael Bosse, a non-Indian who was convicted and sentenced to death for a 2012 murder of a Native American. That case became moot in August, when the state court held that McGirt was not retroactive on state post-conviction review, and overruled its prior decisions to the contrary in past cases, including Bosse.

Oklahoma filed a petition for a writ of certiorari in Victor Manuel Castro-Huerta's case in September 2021, seeking to have McGirt overruled and for clarity on the question of whether the state could prosecute non-Indians for crimes against Indians in Indian country. Castro-Huerta was convicted of child neglect and was sentenced to 35 years in prison; he is a non-Indian and his stepdaughter is an Indian. The crime was committed in Indian territory.

In January 2022, the U.S. Supreme Court denied multiple petitions seeking review of the state post-conviction retroactivity issue, and granted this case, limited to the question of state prosecutorial authority.

== Supreme Court ==
Certiorari was granted in the case on January 21, 2022. Oral arguments were heard on April 27, 2022.

On June 29, 2022, the Supreme Court reversed the Court of Criminal Appeals in a 5–4 vote and ruled that both tribal/federal and state law enforcement have simultaneous jurisdiction to prosecute crimes committed against Indians in Indian country. The majority opinion was written by Justice Brett Kavanaugh. Kavanaugh stated that the presumption that states have no jurisdiction in tribal lands, as established in Worcester v. Georgia (1832), had been weakened in the years since and that "the Worcester-era understanding of Indian country as separate from the State was abandoned later in the 1800s". Kavanaugh then wrote that the General Crimes Act, as codified in 1948, no longer considered tribal lands as distinct from that of the state. Kavanaugh then concluded that state prosecution of non-Native Americans would not interfere with tribal governance, as established through White Mountain Apache Tribe v. Bracker. Kavanaugh wrote "a state prosecution of a crime committed by a non-Indian against an Indian would not deprive the tribe of any of its prosecutorial authority. That is because, with exceptions not invoked here, Indian tribes lack criminal jurisdiction to prosecute crimes committed by non-Indians such as Castro-Huerta, even when non-Indians commit crimes against Indians in Indian Country."

Justice Neil Gorsuch, who had written the majority opinion in McGirt, wrote the dissent in Castro-Huetra. Gorsuch asserted that tribal lands still have sovereignty from the state, and that Worcester still should be considered, writing "Where this Court once stood firm, today it wilts." Gorsuch urged Congress to pass laws similar to Public Law 280 that would clearly define the bounds of tribal sovereignty.
