= Former Indian reservations in Oklahoma =

American Indian reservations

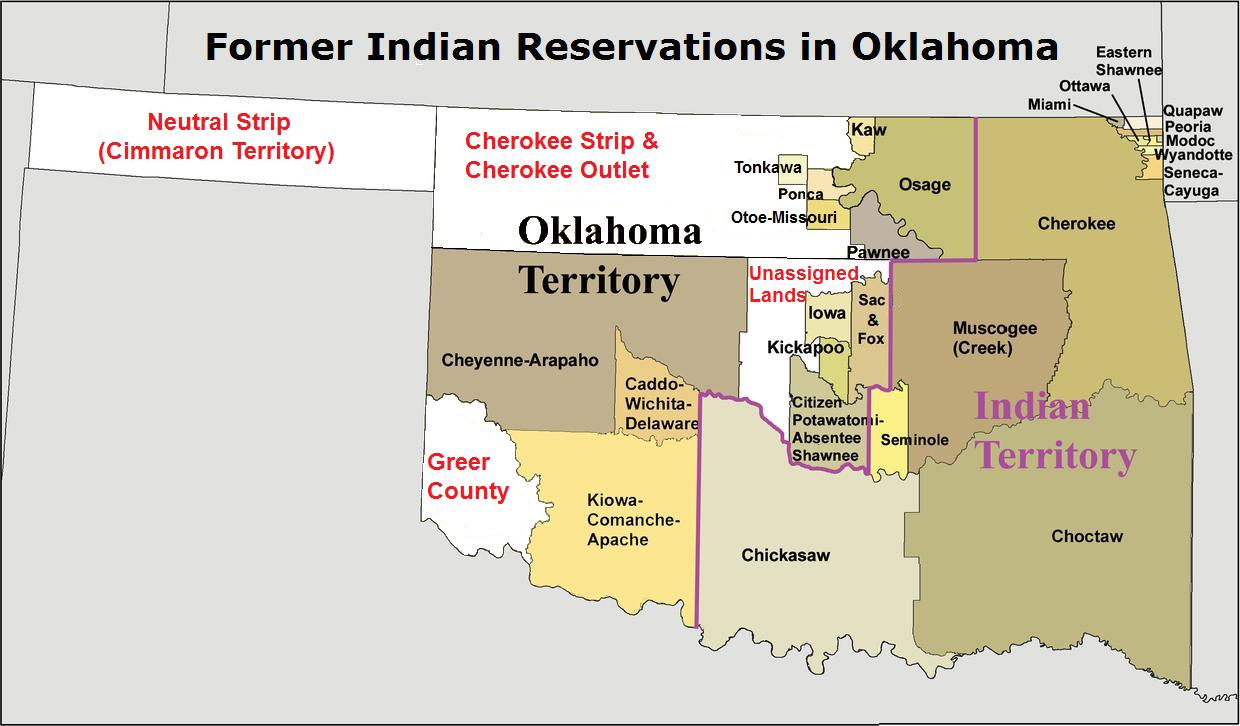
Map of former Indian Reservations in Oklahoma

Both the Oklahoma and Indian Territories contained suzerain Indian nations that had legally established boundaries. The US federal government allotted collective tribal landholdings through the allotment process before the establishment of Oklahoma as a state in 1907. Tribal jurisdictional areas replaced the tribal governments, with the exception of the Osage Nation. As confirmed by the Osage Nation Reaffirmation Act of 2004, the Osage Nation retains mineral rights to their reservation, the so-called "Underground Reservation".

The United States Census has collected data on the reservations since 1990. These Oklahoma Tribal Statistical Areas are based on pre-statehood boundaries and may extend beyond the state border.

In 2017, the United States Court of Appeals for the Tenth Circuit ruled that the Muscogee (Creek) Nation reservation was never abolished by federal law. (See: Carpenter v. Murphy.)

In 2020, the United States Supreme Court ruled in McGirt v. Oklahoma that the land reserved for the Muscogee (Creek) Nation since the 19th century remains Indian country.

== Background ==
In preparation for Oklahoma's admission to the union on an "equal footing with the original states" by 1907, through a series of acts, including the Oklahoma Organic Act and the Oklahoma Enabling Act, Congress enacted a number of often contradictory statutes that often appeared as an attempt to unilaterally dissolve all sovereign tribal governments and reservations within the state of Oklahoma while at other times explicitly supporting their continuity. The 10th U.S. Circuit Court of Appeals held in 2017 that at least one reservation, the modern Muscogee (Creek) Nation Reservation, was never actually dissolved. Congress also transferred virtually all tribal lands by land patent (or first-title deed) to either individual tribal members, sold to non-tribal members on a first-come basis (typically by land run), or was held in trust by the federal government for the benefit of the citizens of the tribes.

By 1936 the federal government had changed its policy with regard to Indian tribes, and Indian nations within the state of Oklahoma were reinstated by the Oklahoma Indian Welfare Act.

Congress tried to further rectify the situation through the Omnibus Budget Reconciliation Act of 1993, which authorized substantial tax incentives based on certain business activity within Indian reservations. Congress wanted to insure these benefits would also be available in Oklahoma by including in the legal definition of Indian reservation the term former Indian reservations in Oklahoma. In a 1997 amendment, these lands were defined as those lands as the "then-current jurisdictional areas" of Oklahoma Indian tribes, as determined by the Secretary of the Interior.

== Tax benefits ==
In 1998 the IRS issued Notice 98-45 which established the boundaries of the Former Indian Reservations in Oklahoma. For tax purposes, current and former lands owned by Indian tribes are treated as if they are an Indian reservation, regardless of current ownership. Approximately 2/3 of the State of Oklahoma is treated as if it were an Indian reservation for tax purposes. In 2010, the IRS issued Memorandum AM2010-33 which addressed a tribe in Oklahoma issuing Tribal Economic Development Bonds.

=== Accelerated cost recovery (depreciation) ===
The Internal Revenue Code of 1986 (as amended) provides for additional accelerated depreciation of property (Code Sec. 168) placed on an Indian reservation (as defined above). In general, depreciation schedules are about 1/3 of the time of regular depreciation schedules. To be eligible, the property must:

- be used by the taxpayer predominantly in the active conduct of a trade or business within an Indian reservation on a regular basis
- not be used or located outside the Indian reservation on a regular basis.
- not be used in conducting or housing class I, II or III gaming as defined in the Indian Regulatory Act.
- not be residential rental property.
- not be owned by a person who is required to use the "alternative depreciation system".
- be placed in service before January 1, 2008.

These accelerated depreciation schedules have been scheduled to expire, and have been reauthorized several times since their implementation.

=== Economic development benefits ===
A HUBZone is a Small Business Administration program that provides incentives for companies to locate and employ people in Historically Underutilized Business Zones. In addition to income criteria, any lands within the external boundaries of a Federally Recognized Indian Reservation, or a former Indian reservation in Oklahoma is included. Government agencies are required to spend at least 3% of their budgets with prime contractors located in HUBZones.

== Department of Defense Indian Incentive ==
The Department of Defense (DoD) Indian Incentive Program, part of the Office of Small Business, provides a 5% rebate to a prime contractor, based on the total amount subcontracted to an Indian-Owned Economic Enterprise or Indian Organization To qualify, the organization must be at least 51% owned by an entity (or tribal member) of a federally recognized tribe.

== See also ==
- Oklahoma Tribal Statistical Area
- List of Native American tribes in Oklahoma
- Aboriginal title in the United States
- Seminole Nation v. United States
- McGirt v. Oklahoma
- Diminishment
- Indian country jurisdiction
- Native American reservation politics
- Off-reservation trust land
- Tribal sovereignty in the United States
