= Indian country jurisdiction =

Authority for tribes of Indigenous people in the United States

Supreme Court Cases & Legislation
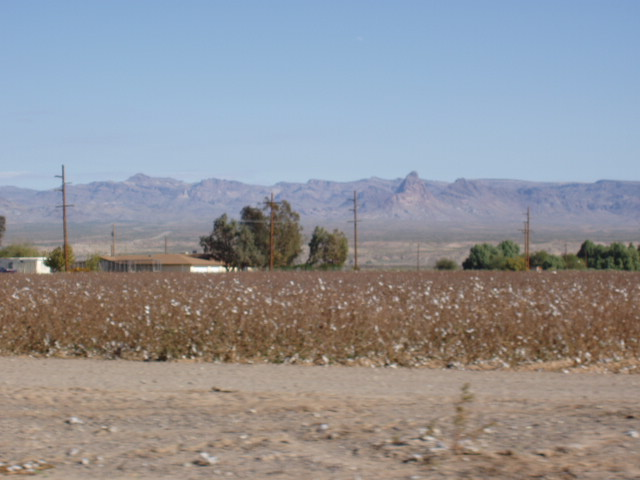
- Panorama of the Fort Mojave Indian Reservation near Bullhead City, Arizona

Colonial & Early U.S. Policy
- Cases: Johnson v. McIntosh; Cherokee Nation v. Georgia; Worcester v. Georgia
- Legislation: Trade & Intercourse Act; Indian Removal Act;

Allotment
- Cases: U.S. v. Kagama; Talton v. Mayes; Lone Wolf v. Hitchcock
- Legislation: Major Crimes Act; General Allotment Act (Dawes Act); Indian Citizenship Act

Reorganization
- Legislation: Indian Reorganization Act

Termination
- Cases: Tee-Hit-Ton v. U.S.; Williams v. Lee
- Legislation: House Concurrent Resolution 108; Public Law 280; Urban Relocation Program; Termination Acts

Self-Determination
- Cases: New Mexico v. Mescalero Apache Tribe; Oliphant v. Suquamish Indian Tribe; United States v. Wheeler; Santa Clara Pueblo v. Martinez; Montana v. U.S.; Merrion v. Jicarilla Apache Tribe; National Farmers Unions Ins. Co. v. Crow Tribe; California v. Cabazon Band of Mission Indians; Mississippi Band of Choctaw Indians v. Holyfield; Duro v. Reina; Nevada v. Hicks; Atkinson Trading Co. v. Shirley; United States v. Lara; Solem v. Bartlett
- Legislation: Indian Civil Rights Acts; Indian Gaming Regulatory Act

Indian country jurisdiction, or the extent which tribal powers apply to legal situations in the United States, has undergone many drastic shifts since the beginning of European settlement in America. Over time, federal statutes and Supreme Court rulings have designated more or less power to tribal governments, depending on federal policy toward Indians. Numerous Supreme Court decisions have created important precedents in Indian country jurisdiction, such as Worcester v. Georgia, Oliphant v. Suquamish Tribe, Montana v. United States, and McGirt v. Oklahoma.

== History ==
There have been many shifts in policy towards Indian Jurisdiction in the history of the United States. There are six major periods of policy regarding American Indians. The first is the British Colonial and Early U.S. Era, which was followed the Removal Era. The next period was the Allotment Era. The Reorganization Era was next and then the Termination Era. This was followed by the Self-Determination Era, which is the current one. Different U.S. Supreme Court cases and Congressional rulings have shifted United States policy regarding Indian Jurisdiction, creating the different eras.

=== Colonial and early U.S. policy ===
The British passed the Proclamation of 1763 which created a boundary line between the British colonies and the American Indians lands west of the Appalachian Mountains. The proclamation forbade the British colonists from moving beyond the proclamation line into Indian Territory.

Important legislations passed by the United States Congress in early United States history were the Indian Intercourse Acts. They were passed in 1780, and then they expired and were renewed every two years until 1802, when permanent legislation was passed. The final Indian Intercourse Act was passed in 1834. These acts did many things, including regulating relations between Indians and non-Indians living on Indian land and defining "Indian Country."

=== Removal ===
After the Louisiana Purchase in 1803, the United States began to extensively negotiate with the Indians in this newly acquired territory. U.S. citizens saw the land as being very fertile and as if it was theirs for the taking and because of this many land disputes arose between Indians and non-Indians in this region. The first case that allowed the American seizure of Indian lands was Johnson v. McIntosh, which stated that when a European nation discovered land in the new world, that it also gained the right to take the land from the natives by purchase or by conquest.

At this time, states wanted to remove Indians from their territory, which led to more treaties and the establishment of the controversial policy of U.S. ethnic cleansing. These feelings resulted in the Indian Removal Act, when Congress authorized President Andrew Jackson to take land away from Indians and give them land in the West. It was the Indian Removal Act that helped Jackson set into place the Trail of Tears in 1831.

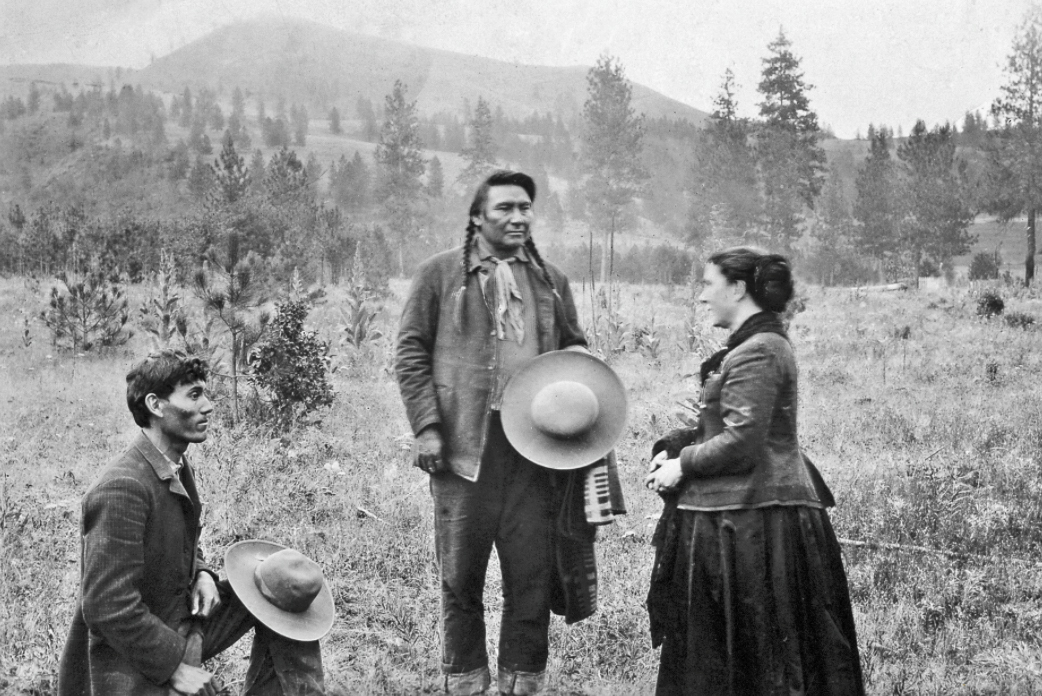
Alice Fletcher is seen here talking with Chief Joseph at the Nez Perce Indian Reservation in Idaho. She arrived in 1889 to implement the Dawes Act. The man kneeling is Fletcher's interpreter.

=== Allotment ===
In the 1870s and 1880s there was an increasing amount of disapproval in regard to the government's reservation policy. People were seeing the Indians in two different ways. One group saw the Indians as a group of people living in poverty and shambles, while another group saw the Indians as a group of people causing large tracts of land to be excluded from white settlers. The combination of the two groups of people and their points of view led to the production of the General Allotment Act of 1887, also known as the Dawes Act. Allotments of 160 acres were handed out to each head of a family. Double amounts were handed out if the land was to be used for grazing. 80 acres (320,000 m^{2}) could also be given to each additional member of the household.

The government would retain the title handed out through the General Allotment Act for 25 years. This time period intended on doing two things. First, it would protect the allottee from immediately having to pay state taxes. Second, the land owner would learn how to manage his land and affairs. However, after the 25 years was up, many Indians found themselves subject to excessive state property taxes, which resulted in the sale of much of the land which Indians received through the Dawes Act. Very soon after many of the Indians losing the land which they earned through the Dawes Act, white settlers moved in on these open lots. This created a checkerboard effect, and made it nearly impossible to have sizable gains in farming and grazing.

The Indian Allotment Act had disastrous effects on the Native Americans. During the Allotment Act, the Native American population reached its lowest point in history. in 1900, the Native American population in the United States was only 250,000. There was also a substantial decrease in the amount of land owned by Native Americans. In 1887 the Indians had held 138 million acres (560,000 km^{2}). By 1934, the amount of land held by Indians had dropped to 48 million acres (190,000 km^{2}), and of that over 20 million acres (81,000 km^{2}) was desert.

=== Reorganization ===
The Allotment period was coming to a close in 1924 when Congress passed a statute granting citizenship to all Indians born within the United States. In 1928 the famous Meriam Report was released. The Meriam Report documented the utter failure of the Dawes Act and the allotment policy. The passage of the Indian Reorganization Act in 1934 officially marks the beginning of the Reorganization period. The Indian Reorganization Act ended the practice of allotment. It sought to protect the tribes and allow them to establish the legal structures for their own self-governments. The tribes were now authorized to create their own constitutions and laws, which could be ratified by a vote among the tribal members. After decades of misfortune and loss of culture and property, the Indian Reorganization Act put a stop to the destruction of the tribes.

=== Termination, 1953-1964 ===
Unclear jurisdictional boundaries between states and tribes prompted the beginning of the Indian termination policy era. The termination era began when Congress passed House Concurrent Resolution 108 in 1953, which stated:

Whereas it is the policy of Congress, as rapidly as possible, to make the Indians within the territorial limits of the United States subject to the same laws and entitled to the same privileges and responsibilities as are applicable to other citizens of the United States, to end their status as wards of the United States, and to grant them all the rights and prerogatives pertaining to American citizenship....

The policy of termination has been seen as a direct attack on the sovereignty of Indian nations - without being considered a reservation or a nation, Indian tribes lost jurisdiction, taxation protection, and emerged into a different world. The Bureau of Indian Affairs attempted to prevent termination for some tribes by insisting the need for governmental assistance for tribes such as the Potawatomi Tribe of Kansas:

They ... have failed to acquire the necessary ambition, providence, and sense of responsibility to rise above their economic level.

Efforts from the BIA did not stop the process of termination. In the twelve years of this policy, 109 tribes were terminated, with severe effects on education, health care, and economic stability.

Cold War policies likely affected the policy of termination. Several reservations and nations enacted social programs, such as health care, on their citizens and socialism was easily connected with the Soviet Union. This fear likely drove Congress to move towards termination.

Termination might have been seen as a method of "freeing" tribes from the BIA and other governmental programs, but the policy likely hindered the efforts of Native Americans for tribal self-rule. Presidents Lyndon B. Johnson and Richard Nixon would lead the nation away from termination into self-determination.

=== Self-determination ===
The policy of termination was ultimately recognized as a failure by the late 1960s, and federal policy regarding Indians shifted toward that of self-determination, or the right of a group or nation to independently govern themselves. The legislation that has arisen from this policy of self-determination, which has been in effect since the late 1960s to the present day, has greatly influenced modern-day Indian country jurisdiction.

One example of this legislation is the Indian Civil Rights Act of 1968, which imposed most of the requirements of the Bill of Rights on the tribes and amended Public Law 280. This legislation both broadened and restricted tribal jurisdiction. The passage of the Act rejected the termination policy by requiring constitutional procedure by the tribal government, but it also limited tribal jurisdiction by limiting the independence of tribal government. The Civil Rights Act of 1968 also amended Public Law 280 so that states no longer held civil and criminal jurisdiction over Indian country unless the tribes consented at certain elections.

Also, in relation to the extension of state law into Indian country, in the 1983 Supreme Court case, New Mexico v. Mescalero Apache Tribe (462 U.S. 324, 334, 1983), it is held that state jurisdiction is permitted to interfere in tribal self-government in circumstances where "the state interests at stake are sufficient to justify the assertion of state authority". In National Farmers Union Ins. Cos. v. Crow Tribe (471 U.S. 845 1885), a case involving civil jurisdiction in Indian country, the Supreme Court held that parties must first exhaust tribal court remedies before seeking federal court review of such questions. The 2001 case Nevada v. Hicks (533 U.S. 355) further limited Indian country jurisdiction by holding that inherent tribal jurisdiction does not extend to state officials who commit crimes on reservation trust lands.

== Present day jurisdiction ==
Indian reservations prior to 2020

Contemporary Indian country jurisdiction has been shaped over the years by the rulings of many Supreme Court cases and federal statutes involving criminal and civil jurisdiction within Indian country. Today, the jurisdiction of Federal, state, or tribal courts usually depends upon whether the parties involved are considered to be Indians or tribal members, the nature of the offense, and whether the events of the case took place in Indian country.

Though the definition varies, people are usually considered an Indian with some Indian blood and considered an Indian by the community. Blood requirements may vary from state to state, but often it is enough to have a parent, grandparent, or great-grandparent qualify as an Indian. To be identified as an Indian for federal and statutory purposes, however, a person must be a member of a federally recognized tribe.

Indian Country, as defined by Congress in 1948 (18 U.S.C.A. 1151) is: a) "all land within the limits of any Indian reservation under the jurisdiction of the United States government, notwithstanding the issuance of any patent, and including rights-of way running through the reservation, b) all dependent Indian communities within the borders of the U.S. whether within the original or subsequently acquired territory thereof, and whether within or without the limits of a state, and c) all Indian allotments, the Indian titles to which have not been extinguished, including rights of way running through the same."

This definition of Indian country includes all territory within an Indian reservation, even land owned by non-Indians in fee simple. Reservation land opened to settlement by non-Indians is still considered Indian country, unless Congress explicitly states its decision to remove the lands from reservation status and hence diminish the Indian country boundaries. Diminishment may occur in other ways, yet retain the meaning of Indian Country.

For example, when the Devils Lake Sioux litigated the question of tribal authority against the North Dakota Public Service Commission, which was operating within reservation borders, the court, relying in part on interpretations of 'Indian Character', ruled that the tribe had no authority over privately held lands even though more Indians than non-Indians lived on the reservation, yet more acreage was held in non-Indian ownership. Many tribes, such as the Yakama in Washington state, have designated 'open' and 'closed' areas, reflecting this difference in the interpretation of jurisdiction. All of the political and legal interpretations of this situation may not eliminate the meaning of Indian Country, but as such they obscure the increasing diminishment of tribal sovereignty within reservation borders.

=== Division of criminal and civil jurisdiction in Indian country ===
==== Federal jurisdiction ====
Some federal criminal statutes are applicable throughout the entire nation, including Indian country, and apply to both Indians and non-Indians, such as treason, theft involving the U.S. mail, the Organized Crime Control Act, Racketeer Influenced and Corrupt Organizations Act (RICO), and the Contraband Cigarette Trafficking Act. The General Crimes Act (18 U.S.C. § 1152) and the Major Crimes Act, (18 U.S.C. § 1153) encompass other crimes and determine the jurisdiction when concerning particular cases. The General Crimes Act of 1817 provides for the prosecution of crimes by non-Indians against Indians and of non-major crimes by Indians against non-Indians through the application of federal law. There are three exceptions to the Act, in which it does not apply to the following: crimes by Indians against Indians, crimes by Indians that received punishment through the tribe, and crimes in which a treaty gives exclusive jurisdiction to the tribe. The Major Crimes Act of 1885 establishes federal jurisdiction in the prosecution of serious crimes committed by Indians in Indian country. In 2020, the United States Supreme Court ruled in McGirt v. Oklahoma that the tribal statistical area (and former reservation) of the Muscogee (Creek) Nation remains under the tribal sovereignty of the Muscogee (Creek) Nation for the purposes of the Major Crimes Act.

Federal civil jurisdiction is very limited in Indian country. Federal courts have jurisdiction in claims that arise under federal law and in cases of diversity of citizenship. Federal courts have no jurisdiction in civil cases involving divorce, adoption, child custody, or probate.

==== Tribal jurisdiction ====
Tribal criminal jurisdiction over Indians in Indian country is complete and exclusive unless there is a federal statute deeming it otherwise or limiting it in some way. Exclusive jurisdiction is given to the tribal courts over non-major crimes committed by Indians against Indians in Indian country, as well as victimless Indian crimes. Jurisdiction is also granted, though not exclusively, to tribal courts over non-major crimes by Indians against non-Indians. In these cases, federal courts also have jurisdiction through the General Crimes Act, so jurisdiction is shared.

Tribal courts have exclusive jurisdiction in civil cases against any Indian in Indian country. This includes cases brought against an Indian by a non-Indian in Indian country, and all cases between tribal members that arise in Indian country. Exclusive jurisdiction over tribal subject matter also belongs to the tribal courts. In divorce cases, tribal courts have exclusive jurisdiction over divorces between Indians living in Indian country. In some divorce cases involving Indians living outside Indian country, the tribal and state courts may have concurrent jurisdiction. The Indian Child Welfare Act of 1978 provides for tribal jurisdiction in adoption and custody cases of Indian children who are domiciled in Indian country. Children ultimately take the domicile of their parents, and children born to unwed parents take the domicile of their mother. Tribal courts also exercise jurisdiction in adoption and custody matters of Indian children who are tribal members. In cases involving probate, tribal courts have exclusive jurisdiction over non-trust movable assets of Indians residing in Indian country.

==== State jurisdiction ====
States have limited criminal jurisdiction in relation to crimes committed in Indian country.

In general, states exercise limited civil jurisdiction in cases involving non-Indians, and sometimes non-tribal members, when these cases arise in Indian country. In divorce cases, states have jurisdiction if both parties are non-Indian and living in Indian country. In matters involving adoption and child custody proceeding between parents, the division of jurisdiction is very similar. The states only have jurisdiction over cases involving the adoption and custody of Indian children not domiciled in Indian country. In probate cases, states have jurisdiction regarding cases of non-trust estates of Indians who died while they were domiciled outside of Indian country and also in cases dealing with any land outside of Indian country.

== See also ==
- Aboriginal title in the United States
- Former Indian reservations in Oklahoma
- Indian country
- Indian Territory
- Indian Child Welfare Act
- Native American reservation politics
- Off-reservation trust land
- Oklahoma Tribal Statistical Area
- Tribal sovereignty in the United States
