= McGirt v. Oklahoma =

- Supreme Court of the United States

Argued May 11, 2020 Decided July 9, 2020
- Full case name: Jimcy McGirt, Petitioner, v. Oklahoma
- Docket no.: 18-9526
- Citations: 591 U.S. 894 (more) 140 S. Ct. 2452; 207 L. Ed. 2d 985
- Argument: Oral argument

Case history
- Prior: Denial for relief, PC-2018-1057 (Okla. Crim. App. Feb. 25) (2019); Cert. granted, 140 S. Ct. 659 (2019)

Holding
- For Major Crimes Act purposes, land reserved for the Creek Nation since the 19th century remains "Indian country".

Court membership
- Chief Justice John Roberts Associate Justices Clarence Thomas · Ruth Bader Ginsburg; Stephen Breyer · Samuel Alito; Sonia Sotomayor · Elena Kagan; Neil Gorsuch · Brett Kavanaugh

Case opinions
- Majority: Gorsuch, joined by Ginsburg, Breyer, Sotomayor, Kagan
- Dissent: Roberts, joined by Alito, Kavanaugh; Thomas (except footnote 9)
- Dissent: Thomas

Laws applied
- Oklahoma Enabling Act; Major Crimes Act

McGirt v. Oklahoma, 591 U.S. 894 (2020), was a landmark United States Supreme Court case which held that the domain reserved for the Muscogee Nation by Congress in the 19th century has never been disestablished and constitutes Indian country for the purposes of the Major Crimes Act, meaning that the state of Oklahoma has no right to prosecute American Indians for crimes allegedly committed therein. The Oklahoma Court of Criminal Appeals applied the McGirt rationale to rule nine other Indigenous nations had not been disestablished. As a result, almost the entirety of the eastern half of what is now the state of Oklahoma remains Indian country, meaning that criminal prosecutions of Native Americans for offenses therein falls outside the jurisdiction of Oklahoma’s court system. In these cases, jurisdiction properly vests within the Indigenous judicial systems and the federal district courts under the Major Crimes Act.

In the immediate wake of McGirt, Oklahoma courts began reviewing past criminal cases involving Native Americans, vacating past convictions, and transferring the matters to the federal courts for criminal prosecution. However, the Oklahoma Court of Criminal Appeals effectively ended this practice by issuing a controversial ruling that McGirt was not retroactive less than a year after the Supreme Court’s decision. Consistent with McGirt, this initially included crimes perpetrated against American Indian victims by non-Indian defendants. However, in 2022, the Supreme Court decided the case of Oklahoma v. Castro-Huerta and held that state courts have concurrent jurisdiction with federal courts over crimes allegedly committed within Indian country against victims who are American Indians by those defendants who are not.

McGirt was related to Sharp v. Murphy, 591 U.S. 894 (2020), heard in the 2018–19 term on the same question but which was believed to be deadlocked due to Justice Neil Gorsuch's recusal; Gorsuch recused because he had prior judicial oversight of the case. Sharp was decided per curiam alongside McGirt.

== Background ==
The reservations of the Five Civilized Tribes in dispute in this case

Prior to its statehood in 1907, about half of the land in Oklahoma, including the Tulsa metro area today, had belonged to the Five Civilized Tribes: the Cherokee, Choctaw, Chickasaw, Muscogee Creek , and Seminole tribal nations, whose nickname arose from their adoption of many characteristics of Anglo-American culture. There had been several decades of warfare and conflict during the 19th century between the Native Americans and the United States over the lands on which the Natives lived, arising from White Americans' efforts to change the Natives from what they viewed as "savage" to their view of "civilized". Eventually, these conflicts led to the Trail of Tears, an over 1,000 mile march from the Eastern US to Oklahoma that the US Government required the Native Americans to endure, resulting in the establishment of reservations. The General Allotment Act started the process of allotting land in Indian reservations. At first the Five Civilized Tribes were exempt from allotment, but the Curtis Act later allowed forced allotment. In 1906, the US Congress passed the Five Tribes Act which contemplated the "dissolution of the tribal governments", but also provided "the tribal existence and present tribal governments of [the Five Tribes] are hereby continued in full force and effect". By 1906, the US Congress passed the Oklahoma Enabling Act, which specifically required Oklahoma to disclaim "all right and title" to Indian property and lands and barred the Oklahoma Constitution from being construed to "limit or impair the right ... of property pertaining to the Indians". The former reservation lands, those of the Five Civilized Tribes as well as the other tribes in the state, were allocated by tribe into areas that gave suzerainty governing rights to the tribe to handle internal matters for Native Americans within the boundaries, but otherwise the state retained jurisdiction for non-Native Americans and for all other purposes such as law enforcement and prosecution.

In Sharp v. Murphy, Patrick Murphy, a citizen of the Muscogee-Creek Nation, admitted to committing murder in the state of Oklahoma, and was subsequently tried by the state courts around 2015. During these trials, Murphy argued that the language of the Oklahoma Enabling Act did not specify that the Native American reservations were disestablished, and because he had committed the murder within the Muscogee reservation territory, that his crime was subject to federal jurisdiction and not state under the Major Crimes Act. This argument was rejected by the state and on its first appeal within the federal courts, but at the Tenth Circuit in 2017, the court found in favor of Murphy's argument that the Enabling Act did fail to disestablish the territories, and thus Murphy should have been prosecuted by the federal courts. Judge Neil Gorsuch was a member of the Tenth Circuit panel at the time. The state petitioned to the Supreme Court in 2018, which agreed to hear the case. By then, Gorsuch had been elevated to the Supreme Court, and he recused himself from all hearings on the case. Because only eight out of nine Justices heard the case, it remained unresolved at the end of the 2018–2019 term; the Court had stated plans to hold another hearing on the case in the 2019–20 term but had not set a date. Many court analysts believed the case to be deadlocked due to Gorsuch's recusal.

== Statements of the case ==
Jimcy McGirt was an enrolled member of the Seminole tribe. In 1991, having recently been discharged from prison, he moved in with and married a woman in Broken Arrow who was not a member of the tribe. McGirt was accused of sexual abuse against his wife's granddaughter by his wife's adult daughter, though there was no physical evidence. McGirt was arrested on November 4, 1996, after turning himself in on an outstanding warrant. Bail was set at $25,000, and McGirt was released from jail in January 1997 after posting bail. He was returned to jail in May 1997 after violating bail conditions, and a new bail was set at $50,000. In June 1997, McGirt was found guilty, and was sentenced to life in prison without the possibility of parole, plus two consecutive 500-year sentences.

After Sharp was granted certiorari by the Supreme Court, McGirt sought postconviction relief on the basis of the 10th Circuit's ruling in Sharp. Both the county and state-level courts refused to grant hearings to McGirt's case, claiming he had failed to show how the state courts lacked jurisdiction in his previous court cases. McGirt subsequently petitioned to the Supreme Court to review.

== Supreme Court ==
McGirt was one of a dozen cases in which the Supreme Court opted to use teleconferencing for oral arguments for the first time in the court's history due to the COVID-19 pandemic. The arguments for McGirt were heard on May 11, 2020. Ian Gershengorn, former Solicitor General of the United States, argued the case, after offering his services to the plaintiff. Observers to the court stated that some justices raised concerns of how ruling in favor of McGirt, in recognizing that the reservations were never disestablished, would impact not only existing convicted prisoners within the state but how the federal courts would subsequently need to handle approximately 8,000 felonies that occur annually on those lands, as well as the impact on legal matters related to businesses and other civil actions that would fall under tribal regulations rather than the state's. Attention was given to the stance of Justice Gorsuch, who appeared to doubt Oklahoma's argument that the lands were effectively disestablished. Justice Sonia Sotomayor stated that should the Court find in favor of McGirt, ruling that the reservations were never formally disestablished, Congress would be able to easily remedy the situation with legislation to affirm the disestablishment.

=== Majority ===
The Court issued its decision on McGirt as well as a per curiam decision on Sharp following the basis of McGirt on July 9, 2020. The 5–4 majority opinion was written by Justice Neil Gorsuch and joined by Justices Ruth Bader Ginsburg, Stephen Breyer, Sonia Sotomayor, and Elena Kagan, and determined that for purposes of the Major Crimes Act, Congress had failed to disestablish the Indian reservations and thus those lands should be treated as "Indian country". Gorsuch wrote, "Today we are asked whether the land these treaties promised remains an Indian reservation for purposes of federal criminal law. Because Congress has not said otherwise, we hold the government to its word."

=== Dissent ===
Chief Justice John Roberts wrote a dissent which was joined by Justices Samuel Alito and Brett Kavanaugh, as well as in part by Clarence Thomas. Roberts wrote of the majority decision, "The state's ability to prosecute serious crimes will be hobbled and decades of past convictions could well be thrown out. On top of that, the court has profoundly destabilized the governance of eastern Oklahoma."

== Impact ==
The decision by the Supreme Court was seen as a significant win for Native American rights. Gorsuch's opinion was seen to acknowledge that many of the promises Congress had made to the Native Americans in turning over reservations have gone unfulfilled. Additionally, Gorsuch rejected the argument presented by the state and federal government which he summarized as: "Yes, promises were made, but the price of keeping them has become too great, so now we should just cast a blind eye."

The Supreme Court's decision directly impacts Native American tribal citizens who are currently convicted under state law for crimes committed on the former reservation lands, as well as for any future descendants who may be arrested for similar crimes covered by the Major Crimes Acts, as their prosecution would become a matter of the federal courts and not the state. At the time, about 1,900 of the prisoners in the Oklahoma system met these conditions, but only around 10% qualified for rehearings to transfer to the federal system as they were still within the statute of limitations.

The majority decision left open other potential impacts between territorial rights that may arise, which the Court put to the state and the tribes to resolve amicably should conflicts occur. Roberts had cautioned in his dissent that this could stretch to include taxation, adoption, and environment regulation rights. Lawyers for the tribal groups asserted that the decision was narrow in affecting only Native American descendants within the lands as no land ownership changed hands. The state and the five tribes issued a joint statement after the decision, stating "The nations and the state are committed to implementing a framework of shared jurisdiction that will preserve sovereign interests and rights to self-government while affirming jurisdictional understandings, procedures, laws, and regulations that support public safety, our economy, and private property rights. We will continue our work, confident that we can accomplish more together than any of us could alone."

== Aftermath ==
=== Native territorial changes ===
Since the case of McGirt v. Oklahoma, there have been multiple cases to recognize the other native tribes rather than just stopping at the recognition of the Muscogee (Creek) Nation.

==== "Five Civilized Tribes" now recognized ====
The Five Tribes received official recognition as reservations again:

- Muscogee (Creek) Nation: This is the largest of the federally recognized Muscogee tribes. They are headquartered in Okmulgee, Oklahoma. Their jurisdiction is in Creek, Hughes, Okfuskee, Okmulgee, McIntosh, Muskogee, Tulsa, and Wagoner counties. The Muscogee are a unified nation of multiple tribes.
- Cherokee Nation: This nation is federally recognized. They are considered sovereign land.
- Choctaw Nation of Oklahoma: Their tribal jurisdiction consists of 10 1/2 Oklahoma counties divided into 12 tribal districts. Their headquarters are in Durant, Oklahoma. They function with their own government with judicial, legislative, and executive branches.
- Chickasaw Nation: This is also a three-branched self-governed native nation. Their jurisdiction takes up Bryan, Carter, Coal, Garvin, Grady, Jefferson, Johnston, Love, McClain, Marshall, Murray, Pontotoc, and Stephens counties.
- Seminole Nation of Oklahoma: This nation is predominantly in Oklahoma and made up of three tribes. Their tribal complex can be found in Wewoka, Oklahoma.

==== Other tribes recognized ====
- Quapaw Nation: This nation is located in parts of Ottawa County, Oklahoma in Northeast Oklahoma. They are headquartered in Quapaw, Oklahoma.
- Miami Tribe of Oklahoma, Peoria Tribe of Indians and Ottawa Tribe of Oklahoma located in Ottawa County, Oklahoma. They are headquartered in Miami, Oklahoma.
- Wyandotte Nation: This nation is located in parts of Ottawa County, Oklahoma. They are headquartered in Wyandotte, Oklahoma.

=== Criminal convictions ===
The Court's judgment reversed McGirt's denial for relief by the Oklahoma criminal court, which withdrew the state convictions and set McGirt to remain in prison until a federal jury trial held in November 2020. McGirt was found guilty on three counts of aggravated sexual abuse and sexual contact in November 2020, and sentenced to life in prison without the possibility of parole in August 2021. McGirt appealed to the Tenth Circuit, which, in June 2023, reversed the ruling based on improper procedures used to introduce testimony from the original trial and ordered a new trial that had been scheduled for March 2024. McGirt pled guilty prior to the new trial in December 2023, and his sentence was reduced to 30 years with time served credited, allowing for his release in May 2024. McGirt was arrested in August 2024 and pleaded no contest in Seminole Nation of Oklahoma court to residing at an address other than his registered address with the sex offender registry. He was sentenced to six months in the Seminole County jail.

In the months following the McGirt decision, several convictions of tribal members who were tried under Oklahoma state law had been undone and new trials held under federal law. Further complicating matters was the March 2021 decision of the Oklahoma Supreme Court in the case of Shaun Bosse, a non-tribal state resident who had been convicted of the murder of a Chickasaw family on tribal lands in 2012. The Oklahoma Supreme Court ruled that under McGirt, Bosse must be tried under federal law as well since the victims were Native American. In April 2021, Oklahoma Governor Kevin Stitt, himself a citizen of the Cherokee Nation, stated that the U.S. Supreme Court's decision had created a threat to public safety because thousands of convicted criminals may have their convictions overturned due to the Bosse ruling. The Cherokee Nation said it was "hard at work to ensure public safety" after the court "acknowledged the state illegally exerted prosecutorial authority involving Natives on our lands for decades" in McGirt and announced they had refiled over 500 cases dismissed in state courts. Following the Bosse ruling, Attorney General Michael J. Hunter filed an emergency request with the U.S. Supreme Court beseeching the judges to intervene and reconsider their McGirt decision. The Supreme Court granted the state's request on May 26, 2021, allowing the state to retain custody of Bosse pending a review of the state's petition. Bosse's case was reheard by the Oklahoma Court of Criminal Appeals in September 2021. The court ruled that the McGirt decision was not retroactive and denied release to the tribal/federal judiciary. As a result, the state withdrew its petition. Other incarcerated Native Americans continued to challenge this ruling, but the U.S. Supreme Court refused to hear these challenges, maintaining the Oklahoma Court's position that McGirt was not retroactive.

==== Oklahoma v. Castro-Huerta ====
In an attempt to overturn the McGirt ruling, either partially or in its entirety, the state filed a new petition to the Supreme Court in the Oklahoma v. Castro-Huerta case. The 2017 case involved Victor Manuel Castro-Huerta, a non-Native American convicted of neglecting a Native American child while living in Tulsa County. Castro-Huerta challenged his sentence, citing McGirt. In April 2021, the Oklahoma Court of Criminal Appeals overturned the sentencing due to jurisdiction issues raised in McGirt. The Castro-Huerta case was one of several cases the Oklahoma Court of Criminal Appeals had applied the McGirt ruling to. The court relied on the precedent set by the McGirt case when deciding any case involving a Native American. The state believed this was excessive. The state's new Attorney General John M. O'Connor stated reversing part of McGirt, would be in the state's best interest and allow the state to protect Native American citizens and prosecute non-Natives who committed crimes against them. State law enforcement, several cities within the affected areas, and the states of Texas, Kansas, Louisiana and Nebraska joined Oklahoma's petition specifically to have the part of the ruling affecting jurisdiction over crimes committed by non-Native Americans on Native land. The state, cities and law enforcement groups alleged that there was an increase in crimes committed against Native Americans by non-Native Americans following the McGirt decision. They went on to claim the McGirt ruling left them unable to enforce or prosecute these crimes, and existing tribal and federal law enforcement was spread too thin to handle the workload.

The Supreme Court granted certiorari of Oklahoma v. Castro-Huerta in January 2022, but specifically stated they would only look at the scope of the decision in McGirt and will not review the McGirt decision itself.

On June 29, 2022, the Court held in Castro-Huerta that Federal and State governments have concurrent jurisdiction to prosecute crimes committed by non-Native Americans against Natives on tribal land.

=== Law enforcement ===
The FBI's jurisdiction expanded in Oklahoma by almost 45% of the state's land.

The ruling allowed the unsolved 1977 Oklahoma Girl Scout murders to be reviewed further by the Cherokee Nation Marshals.

In August 2023, the Supreme Court declined to hear a decision from the Tenth Circuit which was ruled in favor of a tribal member who was ticketed for speeding by the Tulsa police within the portion of Tulsa that was within Muscogee territory, who then had challenged the ticket on the basis of McGirt. The ruling from the Tenth Circuit asserted that because of McGirt, the city could not enforce municipal regulations against tribal members on the parts of the city in tribal lands. Kavanaugh wrote an opinion on the case, joined by Alito, suggesting that there may be further need to review the bounds of McGirt with municipal laws.

== See also ==
- Aboriginal title in the United States
- Former Indian reservations in Oklahoma
- Indian country jurisdiction
- Native American reservation politics
- Off-reservation trust land
- Oklahoma Tribal Statistical Area
- Tribal sovereignty in the United States
