= List of Native American tribes in Oklahoma =

Map of Oklahoma Tribal Reservations

This is a list of federally recognized Native American Tribes in the U.S. state of Oklahoma. With its 38 federally recognized tribes, Oklahoma has the third largest numbers of tribes of any state, behind Alaska and California.

Official Tribal Name	People(s)	Total Pop. (2010)	In-State Pop. (2010)	Tribal Headquarters	County Jurisdiction
Absentee Shawnee Tribe of Indians	Shawnee	3,050	2,315	Shawnee	Cleveland, Pottawatomie
Alabama–Quassarte Tribal Town	Alabama, Coushatta	380	324	Wetumka	Creek, Hughes, Mayes, McIntosh, Muskogee, Okfuskee, Okmulgee, Rogers, Seminole, Tulsa, Wagoner
Apache Tribe of Oklahoma	Plains Apache, Lipan Apache	2,263	1,814	Anadarko	Caddo, Comanche, Cotton, Grady, Jefferson, Kiowa, Stephens
Caddo Nation of Oklahoma	Caddo Confederacy	6,406	3,972	Binger	Blaine, Caddo, Canadian, Custer, Grady, Washita
Cherokee Nation	Cherokee, Cherokee Freedmen, Natchez	299,862	189,228	Tahlequah	Adair, Cherokee, Craig, Delaware, Mayes, McIntosh, Muskogee, Nowata, Ottawa, Rogers, Sequoyah, Tulsa, Wagoner, Washington
Cheyenne and Arapaho Tribes	Arapaho, Cheyenne, Suhtai	12,185	8,664	Concho	Blaine, Canadian, Custer, Dewey, Ellis, Kingfisher, Roger Mills, Washita
Chickasaw Nation	Chakchiuma, Chickasaw	49,000	29,000	Ada	Bryan, Carter, Coal, Garvin, Grady, Jefferson, Johnston, Love, McClain, Marshall, Murray, Pontotoc, Stephens
Choctaw Nation of Oklahoma	Choctaw	223,279	84,670	Durant	Atoka, Bryan, Choctaw, Coal, Haskell, Hughes, Latimer, LeFlore, McCurtain, Pittsburg, Pushmataha
Citizen Potawatomi Nation	Potawatomi	40,000	10,312	Shawnee	Cleveland, Oklahoma, Pottawatomie
Comanche Nation	Comanche	14,700	n/a	Lawton	Caddo, Comanche, Cotton, Grady, Jefferson, Kiowa, Stephens, Tillman, Jackson, Harmon
Delaware Nation	Lenape	1,440	859	Anadarko	Caddo
Delaware Tribe of Indians	Lenape	10,500	3,360	Bartlesville	n/a
Eastern Shawnee Tribe of Oklahoma	Shawnee	2,801	904	Wyandotte	Ottawa
Fort Sill—Chiricahua—Warm Springs—Apache Tribe	Chiricahua Apache, Warm Springs Apache	650	n/a	Apache	Caddo, Comanche, Grady
Iowa Tribe of Oklahoma	Iowa	607	517	Perkins	Lincoln, Logan (Note: Tribe only has jurisdiction over a portion of the county.), Oklahoma, Payne
Kaw Nation	Kaw	3,126	1,428	Kaw City	Kay
Kialegee Tribal Town	Muscogee Creek	439	429	Wetumka	Hughes, McIntosh, Okfuskee
Kickapoo Tribe of Oklahoma	Kickapoo	2,630	1,856	McLoud	Oklahoma, Pottawatomie, Lincoln
Kiowa Tribe	Kiowa	12,000	8,000	Carnegie	Caddo, Comanche, Cotton, Grady, Kiowa, Tillman, Washita
Miami Tribe of Oklahoma	Miami	3,908	775	Miami	n/a
Modoc Tribe of Oklahoma	Modoc	200	120	Miami	Ottawa
Muscogee Nation	Muscogee, Yuchi	69,162	55,591	Okmulgee	Creek, Hughes, Okfuskee, Okmulgee, McIntosh, Muskogee, Tulsa, Wagoner
Osage Nation (Note: The Osage Nation maintains the only federally recognized Indian reservation in the state of Oklahoma.)	Osage	13,307	6,747	Pawhuska	Osage
Otoe–Missouria Tribe of Indians	Missouria, Otoe	2,554	1,732	Red Rock	Noble
Ottawa Tribe of Oklahoma	Odawa	2,500	737	Miami	Ottawa
Pawnee Nation of Oklahoma	Pawnee	3,240	1,791	Pawnee	Noble, Payne, Pawnee
Peoria Tribe of Indians of Oklahoma	Peoria, Kaskaskia, Piankeshaw, Wea	2,925	777	Miami	Ottawa
Ponca Tribe of Indians of Oklahoma	Ponca	3,581	3,000	Ponca City	Kay, Noble
Quapaw Nation	Quapaw	3,240	892	Quapaw	Ottawa
Sac and Fox Nation	Sauk (Thakiwaki)	3,794	2,557	Stroud	Lincoln, Payne, Pottawatomie
Seminole Nation of Oklahoma	Seminole, Seminole freedmen	16,338	13,533	Wewoka	Seminole
Seneca–Cayuga Nation	Cayuga, Seneca	5,059	1,174	Grove	Delaware, Ottawa
Shawnee Tribe	Shawnee	10,000	1,070	Miami	n/a
Thlopthlocco Tribal Town	Muscogee Creek	845	728	Okemah	Creek, Hughes, Mayes, McIntosh, Muskogee, Okfuskee, Okmulgee, Rogers, Seminole, Tulsa, Wagoner
Tonkawa Tribe of Indians of Oklahoma	Tonkawa, Lipan Apache	611	476	Tonkawa	Kay
United Keetoowah Band of Cherokee Indians	Cherokee, Natchez	14,300	13,300	Tahlequah	Adair, Cherokee, Craig, Delaware, Mayes, McIntosh, Muskogee, Nowata, Ottawa, Rogers, Sequoyah, Tulsa, Wagoner, Washington
Wichita and Affiliated Tribes	Kichai, Taovaya, Tawakoni, Waco, Wichita, Yscani	2,564	1,884	Anadarko	Caddo, Grady
Wyandotte Nation	Petun, Wyandot	4,957	1,218	Wyandotte	Ottawa

== See also ==
- Oklahoma Tribal Statistical Area
- Former Indian reservations in Oklahoma
