= Tom Holm =

American academic

- Born: 1946 (age 79–80); Northeastern Oklahoma
- Education: University of Oklahoma (PhD)
- Spouse: Ina (m. 1975)
- Children: 2
- Military career
- Allegiance: United States of America
- Branch: United States Marine Corps
- Service years: 1967–1968
- Unit: Bravo Company, 1st Battalion, 3rd Marines
- Website: ais.arizona.edu/person/tom-holm

Tom Holm (born 1946) is a professor in the Native American Studies program at the University of Arizona.

Holm is a registered citizen of the Cherokee Nation. He is also of Muskogee descent. Holm served in the United States Marines during the Vietnam War. He holds a Ph.D. in history from the University of Oklahoma. Besides being part of the University of Arizona's Native American Studies program he was previously a professor of political science at that institution.

Among works by Holm are Strong Hearts, Wounded Souls: The Native American Veterans of the Vietnam War and The Great Confusion in Indian Affairs: Native Americans and Whites in the Progressive Era (Austin: University of Texas Press, 2005). In 2008 a novel by him entitled Osage Rose was published.

== Awards and nominations ==
In 1997 received the Outstanding Native American Faculty Award.

Selected for an Excellence in Teaching Award during the U of A’s “Year of the Undergraduate” in 1988.

In 2004 was honored with the Graduate College’s Outstanding Teaching and Mentoring Award.

Finalist for the Victor Turner Prize in ethnographic writing in Canada.

== Works ==
- Holm, Tom (July 1, 2007). Rosier, Paul C. (ed.). Code Talkers and Warriors: Landmark Events in Native American History. New York: Chelsea House Pub. ISBN 9780791093405. (168 pgs.)
- Holm, Tom (March 1, 1996). Strong Hearts, Wounded Souls. Austin: University of Texas Press. ISBN 0292730985. (254 pgs.)
- Holm, Tom (August 1, 2023). Ira Hayes: The Akimel O'odham Warrior, World War II, and the Price of Heroism. New York: Twelve. ISBN 1538709503. (320 pgs.)
- Holm, Tom (March 15, 2008). The Osage Rose. Tucson: University of Arizona Press. ISBN 0816526508. (256 pgs.)
- Holm, Tom (October 1, 2015). Anadarko: A Kiowa Country Mystery. Tucson: University of Arizona Press. ISBN 0816531811. (248 pgs.)
- Holm, Tom (September 1, 2005). The Great Confusion in Indian Affairs: Native Americans and Whites in the Progressive Era. Austin: University of Arizona Press. ISBN 0292709625. (264 pgs.)
