= Oklahoma Tribal Statistical Area =

Map of Oklahoma Tribal Statistical Areas, with shown joint-use areas and subdivisions.

Oklahoma Tribal Statistical Area is a statistical entity identified and delineated by federally recognized American Indian tribes in Oklahoma as part of the U.S. Census Bureau's 2010 Census and ongoing American Community Survey. Many of these areas are also designated Tribal Jurisdictional Areas, areas within which tribes will provide government services and assert other forms of government authority. They differ from standard reservations, such as the Osage Nation of Oklahoma (not listed below), in that allotment was broken up and as a consequence their residents are a mix of native and non-native people, with only tribal members subject to the tribal government. At least five of these areas, those of the so-called "Five Civilized Tribes" of Cherokee, Choctaw, Chickasaw, Creek and Seminole (the 'Five Tribes' of Oklahoma), which cover 43% of the area of the state (including Tulsa), are recognized as reservations by federal treaty, and thus not subject to state law or jurisdiction for tribal members.

== List ==
5 Tribes (Reservations)

- Cherokee Nation
- Chickasaw Nation
- Choctaw Nation
- Creek Nation (Muscogee)
- Seminole Nation

Other

- Caddo-Wichita-Delaware OTSA
- Cheyenne-Arapaho OTSA
- Citizen Potawatomi Nation-Absentee Shawnee OTSA
- Eastern Shawnee OTSA
- Iowa OTSA
- Kaw OTSA
- Kickapoo OTSA
- Kiowa-Comanche-Apache-Fort Sill Apache OTSA
- Miami OTSA
- Modoc OTSA
- Otoe-Missouria OTSA
- Ottawa OTSA
- Pawnee OTSA
- Peoria OTSA
- Ponca OTSA
- Quapaw OTSA
- Sac and Fox OTSA
- Seneca-Cayuga OTSA
- Tonkawa OTSA
- Wyandotte OTSA

== Joint Use Areas ==
- Creek–Seminole JUA OTSA
- Kaw–Ponca JUA OTSA
- Kiowa–Comanche–Apache–Fort Sill–Caddo–Wichita–Delaware JUA OTSA
- Miami–Peoria JUA OTSA

== See also ==
- List of Native American Tribes in Oklahoma
- List of historical Indian reservations in the United States
- Indian colony
- Indian reserve, Canada
- Oklahoma Indian Welfare Act
- Ranchería
- Rancherie, Canada
- Aboriginal title in the United States
- Former Indian reservations in Oklahoma
- Indian country jurisdiction
- Off-reservation trust land
- Tribal sovereignty in the United States
