= Off-reservation trust land =

Real estate outside an Indian reservation held by the US govt. for the benefit of a tribe

In the United States, off-reservation trust land refers to real estate outside an Indian reservation that is held by the Interior Department for the benefit of a Native American tribe or a member of a tribe. Typical uses of off-reservation trust land include housing, agriculture or forestry, and community services such as health care and education. The US Census has provided data for trust lands since the 1980 Census.

Under the Indian Gaming Regulatory Act, tribes can purchase off-reservation land and have it placed in trust in order to operate casinos on the land. For example, in 2015 the Spokane tribe won Bureau of Indian Affairs approval for an off-reservation casino. In 2008, the BIA issued guidance that such lands would need to be a "reasonable commute" from the reservation.
