= Lucero v. United States (1869) =

Supreme Court ruling on the Pueblo Tribe

- Started: 1869

Lucero v. United States was a Supreme Court of the United States decision that ruled the Pueblo Tribe of New Mexico was not legally protected under the Nonintercourse Acts. The Nonintercourse Act established federally recognized Indian reservations in the United States. Under one of those acts, Native American reservation land could not be sold by the government. Because the Pueblo were deemed assimilated, they were not considered legally Indian, so they did not qualify for protections under the Nonintercourse Acts.

== Background ==
=== Nonintercourse Act ===
The US government decided to protect the rights of Indigenous people due to the belief of Natives being dependent on the government. This introduced the Nonintercourse Act. It gave different rights to the Indigenous populations as it added them year by year. In 1790, the first act was passed by Congress. In this act, Native American land could not be sold without Congress approving in a public treaty. With this act, America now had control over Indian affairs, and more would be added to regulate trade and commerce.

=== Land rights ===
==== Under the United States ====
Although Native Americans were not citizens, America ruled that natives were still owners of their land, so they had the responsibility of protecting their land.

==== Under Spain ====
In New Mexico, the Spanish Empire during its occupation recognized Pueblo Indians as being independent. Although they were under Spanish control, they were allowed to have control over their land. Spain protected these lands and forbade non-Pueblo to live in those lands.

==== Under Mexico ====
When Mexico became independent in 1821, Mexico maintained some consistency with Pueblo Indians. While they still owned their land, The Mexican government gave Pueblo Indians citizenships due the Plan of Iguala, which called for Indian citizenship. Despite their wishes to protect native land, many non-natives settled into Indigenous land. This strained the trust the Pueblo had in the Mexican government.

With growing migration to Pueblo lands, Mexico promoted the idea of La Gran Familia Mejicana (The Great Mexican Family). The idea was to promote unity among all the races of Mexico. They saw this as being a way to move on from the burdens of their past. Since Pueblo land was not nationalized, settlers were able to purchase land without involving the government so long as they did not alienate communal lands. Thus, there was an increase of sales between Mexican settlers and Pueblo Indians.

=== Citizenship ===
President George Washington was urging action on Indian Affairs. Thus, the first Nonintercourse Act was approved four months after the 1790 Naturalization Act. This act did not make native Americans citizens. The Naturalization act made anyone born to immigrants citizens except Native Americans. They were not given citizenship as Americans believed that giving them citizenship would remove their political existence. However, they were viewed as being subject to the American government since they depended on them. If Natives wanted to naturalize, they had to do it though federal consent.

=== Mexican American War and the Treaty of Guadalupe Hidalgo ===
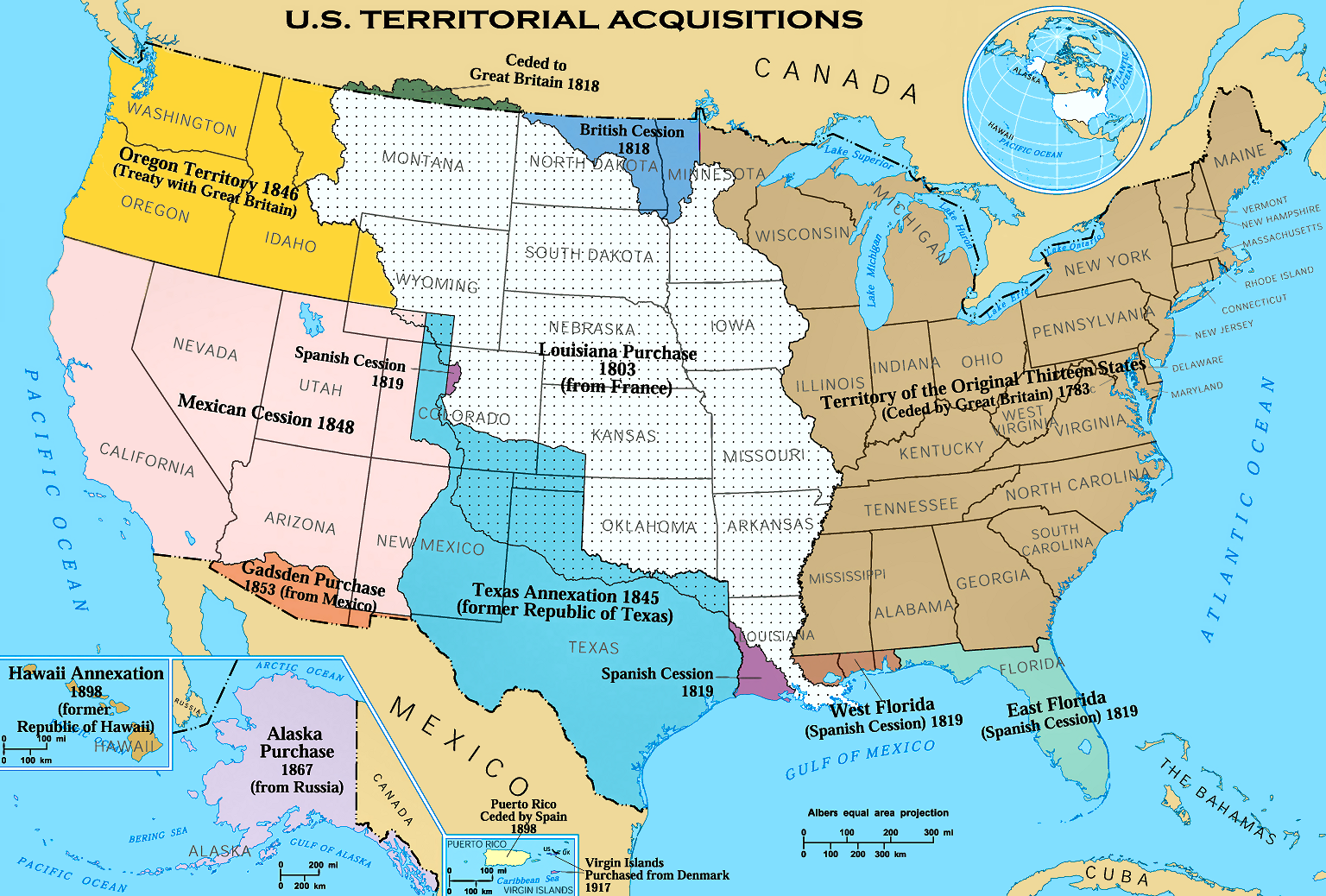
Map of the different Territories America acquired For more info on American Expansion, view; Manifest Destiny

Mexico had seen everyone as equals. Everyone was considered Mexican due to the mestizo population, even at times having African blood. The Mexican-American War caused a significant amount of land to be lost.

Much of the Mexican identity being defined as one was the influence of Spanish colonialism. During Spain's control, the idea of Mestizo was born, which entailed any person who held Indigenous and European blood. This was a result of the Casta system which was hard to keep track of. It was thus assumed everyone was mixed.

America wanted California. Mexico rejected the offer from America, so President Polk sent troops into Mexico, thus beginning the Mexican American War. When Mexico surrounded its land, the Treaty of Guadalupe Hidalgo was signed in February 2, 1848 to bring an end to the Mexican American war. America acquired more than just California, but also the New Mexico Territory and Texas. Since Mexico held everyone as Mexican citizens in the Mexican Cession, the treaty wanted to give every person living in the cession citizenship. America gave the option for the once Mexicans if they wanted to maintain their Mexican citizenship or gain American Citizenship. In the case of New Mexico and Arizona, everyone was fully made a citizen in 1912. Residents had a year to apply for American citizenship. If they did not apply, then they would automatically become US citizens.

The Treaty of Guadalupe Hidalgo held promises for the new citizens. It promised that everyone would maintain their liberty and property. However, in order for someone to maintain their land, they had to prove that their land was theirs though the previous Spanish and Mexican law. Due to this complexity, many land claims were not recognized and thus, taken by the government.

With America acquiring the Mexican Cession, the people living there had mixed ancestry. This would place Mexicans in an ambiguous social and legal positions. Regardless if they were citizens, it was questioned if they should have the same citizen rights as white Americans or be treated as Indians. Mexicans argued that they should all get American citizenship since everyone in Mexico was considered Mexican regardless of what race they were.

It was not clear if the Pueblo Indians, who lived in what was once Mexico, should be given citizenship. The courts determined that if Pueblos were legally "Indians", then their lands would be respected under the Nonintercourse Act. If they were not, then they would have the same rights as any landowner selling their property.

Due to Pueblo Indians not requesting the citizenship they wanted, they automatically became American citizens. Thus having citizenship, they had the right to sell land but would not have special federal protection. Other Indigenous tribes did have protection of land due to being subjects of their land, but Pueblo Indians were not considered subjects. Although citizens, at times, Pueblo Indians were politically involved with other recognized tribes which led to a confusion of where Pueblo Indians fell under the law. When the 1834 Nonintercourse Act was signed, New Mexican Indians were included in this protection. Although not legally Indians, including them in this Act was due to the Spanish and Mexican Titles they had. Pueblo Indians, however, were not living on reservations like other Indigenous tribes.

== Arguments and decisions ==
=== Lucero ===
In 1869, the Federal government tried to evict Mexican-American Jose Juan Lucero from Cochiti Pueblo lands due to the Nonintercourse Act. There were hunts to remove people from Pueblo settlements, but due to the ambiguity of where Pueblo Indians fell, it begged the question of whether Pueblo Indians were federally protected. It was thus brought to the Supreme out of New Mexico. Attorney Stephen B Elkins argued that everyone who settled in Pueblo land should be kicked out due to the Nonintercourse Act. Mexicans hired lawyers who were once a part of the Supreme Court such as Kirby Benedict. Both sides were in agreement that Pueblo Indians become citizens due to the Treaty of Guadalupe Hidalgo. It was understood that Pueblo were not fully treated as other Native American tribes since they were not treated as such from the beginning.

=== Ruling ===
The Supreme Court ruled that Pueblo land was not protected under the Nonintercourse Act since people of Pueblo descent were not legally considered natives. They saw the Pueblo Indians in what they called a positive light, meaning they were equal to the best Mexicans and the best Americans. Their conclusion was that they were not savages like the Native Americans protected by the Nonintercourse Act, since they were civilized due to assimilating to Western culture. They described the Pueblos as peaceful, quiet, and industrious people. With their apparent positive view of the Pueblo, they ruled that Pueblo land could be sold since they were not legally savages.

=== Legacy and influence ===
This would not be the first time the status of Pueblo Indians was questioned. In United States v. Joseph, the Supreme Court once again ruled that Pueblo Indians were not considered Indians since they did not fit the perception of being savages that needed to be regulated.

During the Supreme Court case of United States v. Joseph in 1877, the issue of why Pueblo land was not federally protected was brought up. It ruled that federally protected land only applied to land gained through a treaty between Indians and America. Since Pueblo land was obtained by Spain, it was not applicable. Thus it was once agin ruled that any non-Pueblo person settling in Pueblo land was not violating the Non-intercourse act.

In 1905, the New Mexican Supreme Court ruled that New Mexican Pueblos have to pay property taxes. Its ruling came from the decisions in Lucero and Joseph. However, Congress would intervene and pass an act to give Pueblos tax exemptions. There still continues to be a sale of Pueblo land that is debated.

In modern times, people of Indigenous descent have made lawsuits to regain lands. The ruling is that if an Indian group does not meet the criteria of being a tribe, then the land will not be given back. In Montoya v. United States, the idea of what qualifies as an Indian was revisited and thus a definition of tribe was ruled. It was ruled that a tribe has to be a body of Indians of a similar race that is united under a leadership.

The decision of Pueblo Indians not being protected was in effect for many years. The issue on if Pueblo were protected arose once again in 1912 when Felipe Sandoval was indicted due to trying to sell liquor to the Santa Clara Pueblo. He argued that Pueblos were not federally protected. The district court thus ruled that the Pueblo were only racially Indians, but that was not enough to federally protect them. However, it was brought to the Supreme Court where it overturned Lucero, ruling that Pueblo were now federally protected. This became known as United States v. Sandoval.

== Bibliography ==
- ‌Bethany Berger, Separate, Sovereign, and Subjugated: Native Citizenship and the 1790 Trade and Intercourse Act, 65 Wm. & Mary L. Rev. 1117 (2024), https://scholarship.law.wm.edu/wmlr/ vol65/iss5/4
- Cutter, Donald C.. "The Legacy of the Treaty of Guadalupe Hidalgo." New Mexico Historical Review 53, 4 (2021). https://digitalrepository.unm.edu/nmhr/vol53/iss4/4
- Christine A. Klein, Treaties of Conquest: Property Rights, Indian Treaties, and the Treaty of Guadalupe Hidalgo, 26 N.M. L. Rev. 201 (1996).
- Gómez, Laura E. 2018. Manifest Destinies : The Making of the Mexican American Race. New York: New York University Press.
- Jessica, Barton. 2018. Review of Federal Indian Law—First Circuit Court of Appeals Clarifies Penobscot Nation’s Reservation Boundary—Penobscot Nation v. Mills, 861 F.3d 324 (1st Cir. 2017). June 18, 2018. https://sites.suffolk.edu/lawreview/2018/06/18/firstcircuitcourtofappealsclarifiespenobscotnationsreservationboundary/.
- ‌Johnson, Troy R. 1996. “Roots of Contemporary Native American Activism.” American Indian Culture and Research Journal 20 (2). https://doi.org/10.17953.
- Mejia, Chuck. 2011. Review of Mestizo. Utsa. 2011. https://www.utsa.edu/spectrum/2011/story/mestizo.html.
- Menchaca, Martha. n.d. Review of Chicano Indianism. University of Utah J Willard Marriot Library. http://ereserve.library.utah.edu/Annual/ETHNC/2560/Quijada/indian.pdf.
- Modzelewski, Darren. 2018. “Pueblo Water Rights.” Palgrave Macmillan UK EBooks, January, 53–68. https://doi.org/10.1057/978-1-137-60645-7_4.
- Rosen, Deborah A.. "Pueblo Indians and Citizenship in Territorial New Mexico." New Mexico Historical Review 78, 1 (2003). https://digitalrepository.unm.edu/nmhr/vol78/iss1/2
- Steven A. Knecht, Tribal Status and the Indian Nonintercourse Act: An Alternative to the Montoya Definition of Tribe, 29 Cath. U. L. Rev. 625 (1980).
- Torres, Gerald, "American Blood: Who is Counting and for What?" (2014). Cornell Law Faculty Publications. Paper 1217. [https://scholarship.law.cornell.edu/facpub/1217/ cornell.edu]
