= List of United States Supreme Court cases, volume 30 =

Supreme Court of the United States
- Interactive map of Supreme Court of the United States
- 38°53′26″N 77°00′16″W
- Established: March 4, 1789; 237 years ago
- Location: Washington, D.C.
- Coordinates: 38°53′26″N 77°00′16″W
- Composition method: Presidential nomination with Senate confirmation
- Authorised by: Constitution of the United States, Art. III, § 1
- Judge term length: life tenure, subject to impeachment and removal
- Number of positions: 9 (by statute)
- Website: supremecourt.gov

This is a list of cases reported in volume 30 (5 Pet.) of United States Reports, decided by the Supreme Court of the United States in 1831.

== Nominative reports ==
In 1874, the U.S. government created the United States Reports, and retroactively numbered older privately published case reports as part of the new series. As a result, cases appearing in volumes 1–90 of U.S. Reports have dual citation forms; one for the volume number of U.S. Reports, and one for the volume number of the reports named for the relevant reporter of decisions (these are called "nominative reports").

=== Richard Peters, Jr. ===
Starting with the 26th volume of U.S. Reports, the Reporter of Decisions of the Supreme Court of the United States was Richard Peters Jr. Peters was Reporter of Decisions from 1828 to 1843, covering volumes 26 through 41 of United States Reports which correspond to volumes 1 through 16 of his Peters's Reports. As such, the dual form of citation to, for example, Hunter v. United States is 30 U.S. (5 Pet.) 173 (1831).

== Justices of the Supreme Court at the time of 30 U.S. (5 Pet.) ==
The Supreme Court is established by Article III, Section 1 of the Constitution of the United States, which says: "The judicial Power of the United States, shall be vested in one supreme Court . . .". The size of the Court is not specified; the Constitution leaves it to Congress to set the number of justices. Under the Judiciary Act of 1789 Congress originally fixed the number of justices at six (one chief justice and five associate justices). Since 1789 Congress has varied the size of the Court from six to seven, nine, ten, and back to nine justices (always including one chief justice).

When the cases in 30 U.S. (5 Pet.) were decided, the Court comprised these seven justices:

Portrait	Justice	Office	Home State	Succeeded	Date confirmed by the Senate (Vote)	Tenure on Supreme Court
	John Marshall	Chief Justice	Virginia	Oliver Ellsworth	January 27, 1801 (Acclamation)	February 4, 1801 – July 6, 1835 (Died)
	William Johnson	Associate Justice	South Carolina	Alfred Moore	March 24, 1804 (Acclamation)	May 7, 1804 – August 4, 1834 (Died)
	Gabriel Duvall	Associate Justice	Maryland	Samuel Chase	November 18, 1811 (Acclamation)	November 23, 1811 – January 12, 1835 (Resigned)
	Joseph Story	Associate Justice	Massachusetts	William Cushing	November 18, 1811 (Acclamation)	February 3, 1812 – September 10, 1845 (Died)
	Smith Thompson	Associate Justice	New York	Henry Brockholst Livingston	December 9, 1823 (Acclamation)	September 1, 1823 – December 18, 1843 (Died)
	John McLean	Associate Justice	Ohio	Robert Trimble	March 7, 1829 (Acclamation)	January 11, 1830 – April 4, 1861 (Died)
	Henry Baldwin	Associate Justice	Pennsylvania	Bushrod Washington	January 6, 1830 (41–2)	January 18, 1830 – April 21, 1844 (Died)

== Notable Case in 30 U.S. (5 Pet.) ==
=== Cherokee Nation v. Georgia ===
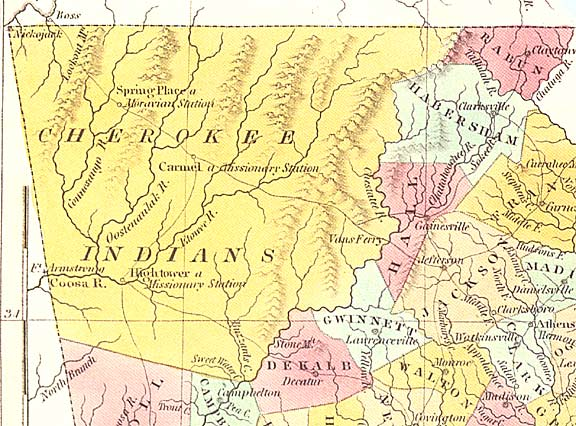
Map of northeastern Georgia, showing Cherokee lands in 1830

In Cherokee Nation v. Georgia, 30 U.S. (5 Pet.) 1 (1831), the Cherokee Nation sought a federal injunction against laws passed by the U.S. state of Georgia depriving the tribe of rights within its geographical boundaries, but the Supreme Court did not hear the case on its merits. It ruled that it had no original jurisdiction in the matter, since the Cherokees were a dependent nation, with a relationship to the United States like that of a "ward to its guardian". One year later, however, in Worcester v. Georgia, 31 U.S. 515 (1832), the Supreme Court ruled that the Cherokee Nation was sovereign. According to the decision, this meant that Georgia had no right to enforce state laws in the Cherokee territory. President Andrew Jackson refused to enforce the ruling, however, instead directing the expulsion of the Cherokee Nation from Georgia. U.S. Army forces were used in some cases to round them up. Their expulsion and subsequent route is called "The Trail of Tears". Of the 15,000 who left Georgia, 4,000 died on the journey to Indian Territory in the present-day U.S. state of Oklahoma.

== Citation style ==
Under the Judiciary Act of 1789 the federal court structure at the time comprised District Courts, which had general trial jurisdiction; Circuit Courts, which had mixed trial and appellate (from the US District Courts) jurisdiction; and the United States Supreme Court, which had appellate jurisdiction over the federal District and Circuit courts—and for certain issues over state courts. The Supreme Court also had limited original jurisdiction (i.e., in which cases could be filed directly with the Supreme Court without first having been heard by a lower federal or state court). There were one or more federal District Courts and/or Circuit Courts in each state, territory, or other geographical region.

Bluebook citation style is used for case names, citations, and jurisdictions.

- "C.C.D." = United States Circuit Court for the District of . . .
  - e.g.,"C.C.D.N.J." = United States Circuit Court for the District of New Jersey
- "D." = United States District Court for the District of . . .
  - e.g.,"D. Mass." = United States District Court for the District of Massachusetts
- "E." = Eastern; "M." = Middle; "N." = Northern; "S." = Southern; "W." = Western
  - e.g.,"C.C.S.D.N.Y." = United States Circuit Court for the Southern District of New York
  - e.g.,"M.D. Ala." = United States District Court for the Middle District of Alabama

\* "Ct. Cl." = United States Court of Claims

- The abbreviation of a state's name alone indicates the highest appellate court in that state's judiciary at the time.
  - e.g.,"Pa." = Supreme Court of Pennsylvania
  - e.g.,"Me." = Supreme Judicial Court of Maine

== List of cases in 30 U.S. (5 Pet.) ==
Case Name	Page and year	Opinion of the Court	Concurring opinion(s)	Dissenting opinion(s)	Lower court	Disposition
Cherokee Nation v. Georgia	1 (1831)	Marshall	Johnson, Baldwin	Thompson	original	dismissed
Scott's Lessee v. Ratliffe	81 (1831)	Marshall	none	none	C.C.D. Ky.	reversed
Livingston v. Smith	90 (1831)	Johnson	none	none	C.C.D.N.J.	affirmed
Union Bank v. Geary	99 (1831)	Thompson	none	none	C.C.D.C.	affirmed
United States v. Tingey	115 (1831)	Story	none	none	C.C.D.C.	affirmed
United States v. Tingey's Administrators	131 (1831)	per curiam	none	none	C.C.D.C.	amendment denied
Greenleaf's Lessee v. Birth	132 (1831)	Story	none	none	C.C.D.C.	reversed
Simonton v. Winter	141 (1831)	Thompson	none	none	C.C.D.C.	reversed
Henderson v. Griffin	151 (1831)	Baldwin	none	none	C.C.D.S.C.	affirmed
Backhouse v. Patton	160 (1831)	McLean	none	none	C.C.E.D. Va.	certification
Hunter v. United States	173 (1831)	McLean	none	none	C.C.D.R.I.	affirmed
Ex parte Crane	190 (1831)	Marshall	none	Baldwin	C.C.S.D.N.Y.	mandamus denied
Yeaton v. Lynn ex rel. Lyles	224 (1831)	Marshall	none	none	C.C.D.C.	affirmed
Doe ex rel. Patterson v. Winn	233 (1831)	Story	none	Johnson	C.C.D. Ga.	reversed
Fisher's Lessor v. Cockerell	248 (1831)	Marshall	none	none	C.C.D. Ky.	dismissed
Cathcart v. Robinson	264 (1831)	Marshall	Baldwin	Baldwin	C.C.D.C.	reversed
New Jersey v. New York	284 (1831)	Marshall	none	none	original	continued
Smith v. United States	292 (1831)	McLean	none	none	D. Mo.	reversed
Page v. Lloyd	304 (1831)	McLean	none	Johnson	C.C.E.D. Va.	certification
Clarke's Lessee v. Courtney	319 (1831)	Story	none	Baldwin	C.C.D. Ky.	reversed
Tayloe v. Thomson's Lessee	358 (1831)	Baldwin	none	none	C.C.D.C.	affirmed
Farrar v. United States	373 (1831)	Johnson	none	none	D. Mo.	reversed
Shankland v. Washington	390 (1831)	Story	none	none	C.C.D.C.	affirmed
Hinde v. Vattier's Lessee	398 (1831)	Baldwin	none	none	C.C.D. Ohio	affirmed
Jackson ex rel. Bradstreet v. Huntington	402 (1831)	Johnson	none	none	N.D.N.Y.	affirmed
City of New Orleans v. United States	449 (1831)	per curiam	none	none	E.D. La.	reversed
District of Columbia Levy Court v. Ringgold	451 (1831)	Thompson	none	none	C.C.D.C.	affirmed
Hawkins v. Barney's Lessee	457 (1831)	Johnson	none	none	C.C.D. Ky.	reversed
Lewis v. Marshall	470 (1831)	McLean	none	none	C.C.D. Ky.	multiple
Second Bank of the United States v. Martin	479 (1831)	Marshall	none	none	C.C.D. Ala.	affirmed
Peltz v. Clarke	481 (1831)	Marshall	none	none	C.C.D.C.	affirmed
Peyton v. Stith	485 (1831)	Baldwin	none	none	C.C.D. Ky.	reversed
Fowle v. Lawrason's Executor	495 (1831)	Marshall	none	none	C.C.D.C.	reversed
Menard v. Aspasia	505 (1831)	McLean	none	none	Mo.	dismissed
Smith v. Union Bank	518 (1831)	Johnson	none	none	C.C.D.C.	affirmed
Winship v. Second Bank of the United States	529 (1831)	Marshall	none	none	C.C.D. Mass.	affirmed
Tiernan v. Jackson	580 (1831)	Story	none	none	C.C.D. Md.	reversed
Patapsco Insurance Company v. Southgate	604 (1831)	Thompson	none	none	C.C.D. Md.	affirmed
Edmondston v. Drake	624 (1831)	Marshall	none	none	C.C.D.S.C.	reversed
United States v. Robertson	641 (1831)	Marshall	none	Baldwin	C.C.D. Md.	certification
Sheppard v. Taylor	675 (1831)	Story	none	none	C.C.D. Md.	certification
Potter v. Gardner	718 (1831)	McLean	Baldwin	Baldwin	C.C.D.R.I.	reversed

== See also ==
- certificate of division
