= United States v. Tingey =

- Supreme Court of the United States
- Full case name: The United States v. Thomas Tingey
- Citations: 30 U.S. 115 (more) 5 Pet. 115; 8 L. Ed. 66; 1831 U.S. LEXIS 341

United States v. Tingey, 30 U.S. (5 Pet.) 115 (1831), was an early United States Supreme Court case held on appeal from the circuit court of the United States for the District of Columbia, which recognized that the U.S. Government has a right to enter into a contract without relying on any specific legal mandate for authorization.

The case involved Commodore Thomas Tingey who, with others, had acted as surety for a bond executed on 1 May 1812 by Lewis Deblois, a naval purser.
