= Shankland v. Washington =

1831 US Supreme Court case

- Supreme Court of the United States

Argued March 17-18, 1830 Decided January 21, 1831
- Full case name: Alexander B. Shankland v. Mayor, Aldermen, and Common Council of Washington
- Citations: 30 U.S. 390 (more)

Holding
- When individuals purchase a share of someone else's contractual right to a future payout, they do not enter into a contractual relationship with the original seller.

Court membership
- Chief Justice John Marshall Associate Justices William Johnson · Gabriel Duvall; Joseph Story · Smith Thompson; John McLean · Henry Baldwin

Case opinion
- Majority: Story, joined by unanimous

Shankland v. Washington, 30 U.S. 390 (1831), is a United States Supreme Court case on lotteries and contractual relations, which held that when individuals purchase a share of someone else's contractual right to a future payout, they do not enter into a contractual relationship with the original seller.

== Background ==
After Congress chartered a National Lottery in Washington, D.C., the city sold all tickets to a man named Gillespie. Gillespie sold half-tickets redeemable for half of the associated ticket's value upon the city's drawing. When Alexander B. Shankland was unable to redeem his half-ticket for its $25,000 value ($738,203 in 2024) through Gillespie, he sought his payout from the city government. The city government countered that it had already fulfilled its contractual obligations by paying Gillespie the full amount, prompting this lawsuit.

== Supreme Court ==
In a unanimous opinion written by Associate Justice Joseph Story, the Supreme Court held that when individuals purchase a share of someone else's contractual right to a future payout, they do not enter into a contractual relationship with the original seller.

Story's claim that "the general rule of law is, that a delegated authority cannot be delegated" has been cited to support the nondelegation doctrine, despite this case dealing with a city government's transactions with private individuals.
