= United States v. Sandoval =

- Supreme Court of the United States

Argued February 27, 1913 Decided October 20, 1913
- Full case name: United States v. Sandoval
- Citations: 231 U.S. 28 (more) 34 S. Ct. 1; 58 L. Ed. 107

Case history
- Prior: 198 F. 539 (D.N.M. 1912)

Holding
- Generally applicable federal Indian statutes apply to the Pueblo, which are dependent Indian communities rather than domestic dependent nations.

Court membership
- Chief Justice Edward D. White Associate Justices Joseph McKenna · Oliver W. Holmes Jr. William R. Day · Horace H. Lurton; Charles E. Hughes · Willis Van Devanter; Joseph R. Lamar · Mahlon Pitney

Case opinion
- Majority: Van Devanter, joined by unanimous

United States v. Sandoval, 231 U.S. 28 (1913), was a United States Supreme Court case deciding whether the federal government's law prohibiting liquor on the land of Santa Clara Pueblo impermissibly infringed on the State of New Mexico's police power under the equal footing doctrine. In a unanimous decision, the Court upheld the law and Congress's ability to recognize and regulate tribes, and recognized the Pueblo peoples as legally Native American. Citing broad congressional authority in Kagama, recognition of tribes subject to the guardianship of the federal government falls on Congress, not the Court, as long as recognition is not "arbitrary" and actually reflects "distinctly Indian communities." The Supreme Court held the Pueblos to be dependent Indian communities, which is distinct from most Native nations' status as domestic dependent nations.

== Background ==
The King of Spain granted formal title to the Pueblo people in 1689. Mexico ceded most of what is today New Mexico to the United States in 1848 under the Treaty of Guadalupe Hidalgo. New Mexico was a territory until January 6, 1912, when it became the forty seventh state to be added to the United States. Previous decisions of the US Supreme Court held that the Nonintercourse Act did not restrict the alienability of Pueblo peoples or lands. When the Supreme Court reversed its position in 1913, the land title to much of the state was called into question. Justice Miller of the Supreme Court had previously ruled, "Every person who makes a settlement on any lands belonging, secured, or granted by treaty with the United States to any Indian tribe, or surveys or attempts to survey said lands, or to designate any of the boundaries by marking trees or otherwise, is liable to a penalty of $1,000."

Congress responded in 1924 and 1933 with compromise legislation to extinguish some aboriginal title and to establish procedures for determination and compensation. In United States v. Sandoval, 231 U.S. 28 (1913), the question before the Supreme Court was whether Pueblo lands, which were owned by land grants with the Spanish government and later recognized by the United States after the Mexican–American War, were "owned" by the Pueblo peoples. The case involved the sale of alcohol by a non-Indian, Felipe Sandoval, to the Pueblo of New Mexico at the San Juan Village. Sandoval argued such sales were legal, based on decisions territorial court since 1905. New Mexico became a State in 1912. The Statehood Act acknowledged Pueblo lands as "Indian Country" defined as "distinctly Indian communities, recognized and treated by the government as dependent communities entitled to federal protection." The court ultimately ruled that it was for Congress alone to determine when guardianship over Indians should cease. The citizenship of Indians did not prevent Congress from enacting laws to protect and benefit tribes.

== Opinion ==
Justice Willis Van Devanter delivered the opinion of the Court. The Court held that the enabling act applied generally applicable federal Indian statutes to the Pueblo, citing Kagama. This was the first time the Supreme Court recognized Pueblo peoples as Native Americans legally, although they were labelled dependent Indian communities rather than domestic dependent nations due to their history of city-state behavior.

Sandoval repudiated the prior Supreme Court case of United States v. Joseph (1876), which had held that the Pueblos were not "Indians."

== Aftermath ==
=== Bootlegging ===
"Bootlegging" of alcohol continued after the decision. The Bureau of Indian Affairs took little action against bootleggers, although tribal courts did mete out punishment. In 1953, the BIA lifted the ban on possession and distribution of alcohol, as part of its "tribalization" policy.

=== Implications for Pueblo lands ===
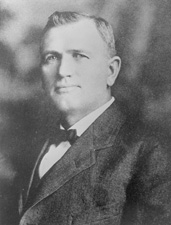
Senator Holm Bursum (R-NM)

Sandoval, by holding that Pueblo lands were Indian Indian Country, at least for purposes of liquor regulation by the federal government, cast a cloud over many non-Indian land titles in New Mexico. In effect, the Court had repudiated the prior view that the Pueblo held land in fee simple and were able to sell land to non-Indians without Congressional approval. The federal government, which viewed the Pueblo title as held by tribes rather than individual Indians, argued that the Nonintercourse Act applied. Further, the federal government viewed the Pueblo as a "domestic dependent nation" within the meaning of Cherokee Nation v. Georgia and Worcester v. Georgia.

New Mexico Senator Holm Bursum proposed legislation to quiet titles in the states. Secretary of the Interior Albert Fall also supported this approach.

The bill was discussed on November 3, 1922, at a meeting of 19 Pueblos in Santo Domingo between. The Pueblos opposed the legislation, publishing "An Appeal for Fair Play and the Preservation of Pueblo Land" on November 5, 1922. John Collier published articles outlining the reasons for the Pueblo's opposition in the Santa Fe New Mexican (November 6) and the New York Times (November 7). Soon thereafter, the hearings for the bill were delayed until February 1923. In the interim, Secretary Fall was replaced.

A compromise bill was created in 1924, which some Pueblos supported. The new bill created a Pueblo Lands Board to resolve disputed claims.
