= Nathan Ross Margold =

American judge

- Born: 1899; Iași, Romania
- Died: December 17, 1947 (aged 47–48); Washington, D.C., U.S.
- Education: City College of New York (BA); Harvard University (LLB)
- Occupation: Lawyer

Nathan Ross Margold (1899 – December 17, 1947) was a Romanian-born American lawyer. He was a municipal judge in Washington, D.C., and the author of the 1933 Margold Report to promote civil rights for African-Americans through the courts. He was also a supporter of Native American civil rights and Native American sovereignty. In addition to his legal career, Margold is remembered as the father of adult film pioneer William Margold.

== Early life ==
Nathan Ross Margold was born in Iași, Romania in 1899, to Wolf Margulies and Rosa Kahan. He was brought to the United States aged two. Growing up in Brooklyn, he graduated from City College of New York in 1919. Margold then attended Harvard Law School. He became the editor of the school's Law Review. He was a "protégé" of Felix Frankfurter, who interested him in working for social reforms and workers rights. Later, during the New Deal era, former students of Frankfurter who joined the U.S. Federal government (including Margold) were collectively referred to as "Happy Hotdogs" invoking a pun on their mentor's name.

== Career ==
After earning his law degree, Margold returned to New York City in 1923 and set up a private practice. From 1925 to 1927 Margold served as the assistant U.S. attorney for the Southern District of New York. In 1927 Margold married Gertrude Weiner (the couple would go on to have a son).

Also in 1927, Felix Frankfurter persuaded Margold to return to his alma mater, the Harvard Law School, and teach Criminal Law. Harvard president A. Laurence Lowell opposed Margold, as he did not want another Jewish reformer on the faculty. Lowell's opposition was countered by law school dean Roscoe Pound who was a supporter of Frankfurter. Pound was forced to back down to Lowell after almost two years of pressure, and Margold lost his job. Margold returned to his private practice in New York City in 1928.

From 1928 to 1929 Margold served as a special counsel for the New York Transit Commission. In 1930 he served as a legal adviser on Indian affairs for the Institute for Government Research. During this time Margold also wrote many articles for law journals and coedited Cases on Criminal Law.

Due to Frankfurter's recommendation, the National Association for the Advancement of Colored People (NAACP) recruited Margold as a special counsel beginning from 1930 through 1933. In 1931, Margold wrote a book-length strategy (often referred to as the Margold Report), presenting an outline to desegregate public schools in the south. The NAACP adapted many of its ideas to advance civil rights for African-Americans through the courts, culminating in 1954's Brown v. Board of Education.

Margold received recommendations from Frankfurter and Justice Louis Brandeis and was hired as the solicitor for the United States Department of the Interior. He served in this department from 1933 to 1942, including acting as an aide to Interior Secretary Harold L. Ickes. Ickes named him as chairman of the Petroleum Administrative Board after the National Recovery Administration codified the industry. He was then appointed chairman of the Petroleum Labor Policy Board to administer that code, and served in that position from 1933 to 1935. The position was dissolved when the U.S. Supreme Court ruled that parts of the National Industrial Recovery Act, which had delegated petroleum code-making authority to the Executive branch, were unconstitutional in Panama Refining Co. v. Ryan. From 1933 to 1935 Margold also acted as a special assistant attorney general. With John Collier, Margold wrote the solicitor's opinion, "Powers of Indian Tribes" which was issued October 25, 1934, and commented on the wording of the Indian Reorganization Act. According to Vine Deloria Jr. and Clifford M. Lytle, "Modern tribal sovereignty thus [began] with this opinion" because the opinion recognized that the sovereignty of Indian tribes was inherent, rather than being granted to them by the federal government.

In 1940, Margold wrote the introduction to the Handbook of Federal Indian Law by Felix S. Cohen. Margold believed that Indian self-governance was "a revealing record in the development of our American constitutional democracy."

Margold was a member of the Modern Forum of the League for Peace and Democracy, an organization named as a "Communist front organization" by witnesses during a hearing of the House Un-American Activities Committee in 1938.

Recognizing his loyalty and legal expertise, Franklin Delano Roosevelt appointed Margold as a judge on the Municipal Court for the District of Columbia in 1942 where he continued to serve until 1945. He was then moved to the U.S. District Court in the District of Columbia and served there until his death in 1947.

== Death ==
Margold died on December 17, 1947, in Washington, D.C.
