= Commentaries on the Constitution of the United States =

Three-volume work by Joseph Story first published in 1833

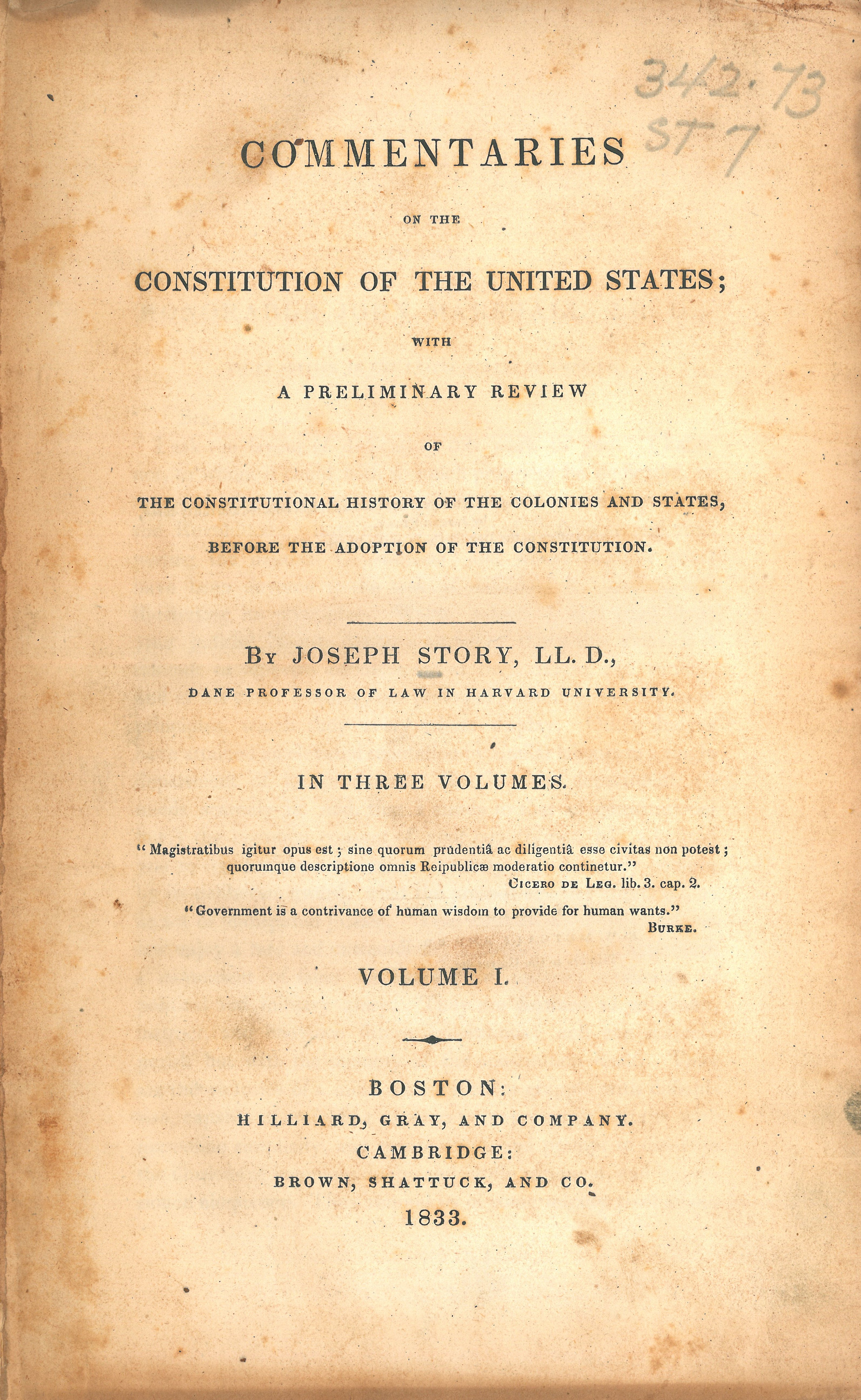
- The title page of volume I of the first edition of Story's Commentaries on the Constitution of the United States (1833)
- Author: Joseph Story
- Language: English
- Subject: Constitutional law
- Published: 1833 (Hilliard, Gray, and Company; Brown, Shattuck and Co.)
- Publication place: United States
- Media type: Print (hardback) (3 volumes)
- OCLC: 3826953

Commentaries on the Constitution of the United States is a three-volume treatise written by Associate Justice of the Supreme Court of the United States Joseph Story and published in 1833. In these Commentaries, Story defends the power of the national government and economic liberty. "My object will be", Story wrote, "sufficiently attained, if I shall have succeeded in bringing before the reader the true view of its powers, maintained by its founders and friends, and confirmed and illustrated by the actual practice of the government."

== Contents ==
=== Dedication to John Marshall ===
Story dedicates his Commentaries to his friend and fellow Justice, Chief Justice John Marshall:

When, indeed, I look back upon your judicial labors during a period of thirty-two years, it is difficult to suppress astonishment at their extent and variety, and at the exact learning, the profound reasoning, and the solid principles which they everywhere display. Other judges have attained an elevated reputation by similar labors, in a single department of jurisprudence. But in one department, (it need scarcely be said that I allude to that of constitutional law,) the common consent of your countrymen has admitted you to stand without a rival.

=== Preface ===
In his preface Story writes:

From two great sources, however, I have drawn by far the greatest part of my most valuable materials. These are, The Federalist, an incomparable commentary of three of the greatest statesmen of their age, and the extraordinary Judgments of Mr. Chief Justice Marshall upon constitutional law. The former have discussed the structure and organization of the national government, in all its departments, with admirable fulness and force. The latter has expounded the application and limits of its powers and functions with unrivalled profoundness and felicity. The Federalist could do little more than state the objects and general bearing of these powers and functions. The masterly reasoning of the Chief Justice has followed them out to their ultimate results and boundaries with a precision and clearness approaching, as near as may be, to mathematical demonstration.

Story contrasts these commentaries to the writings of other commentators of the Constitution: "The reader must not expect to find in these pages any novel views and novel constructions of the Constitution. I have not the ambition to be the author of any new plan of interpreting the theory of the Constitution, or of enlarging or narrowing its powers by ingenious subtitlies and learned doubts."

=== Book I ===
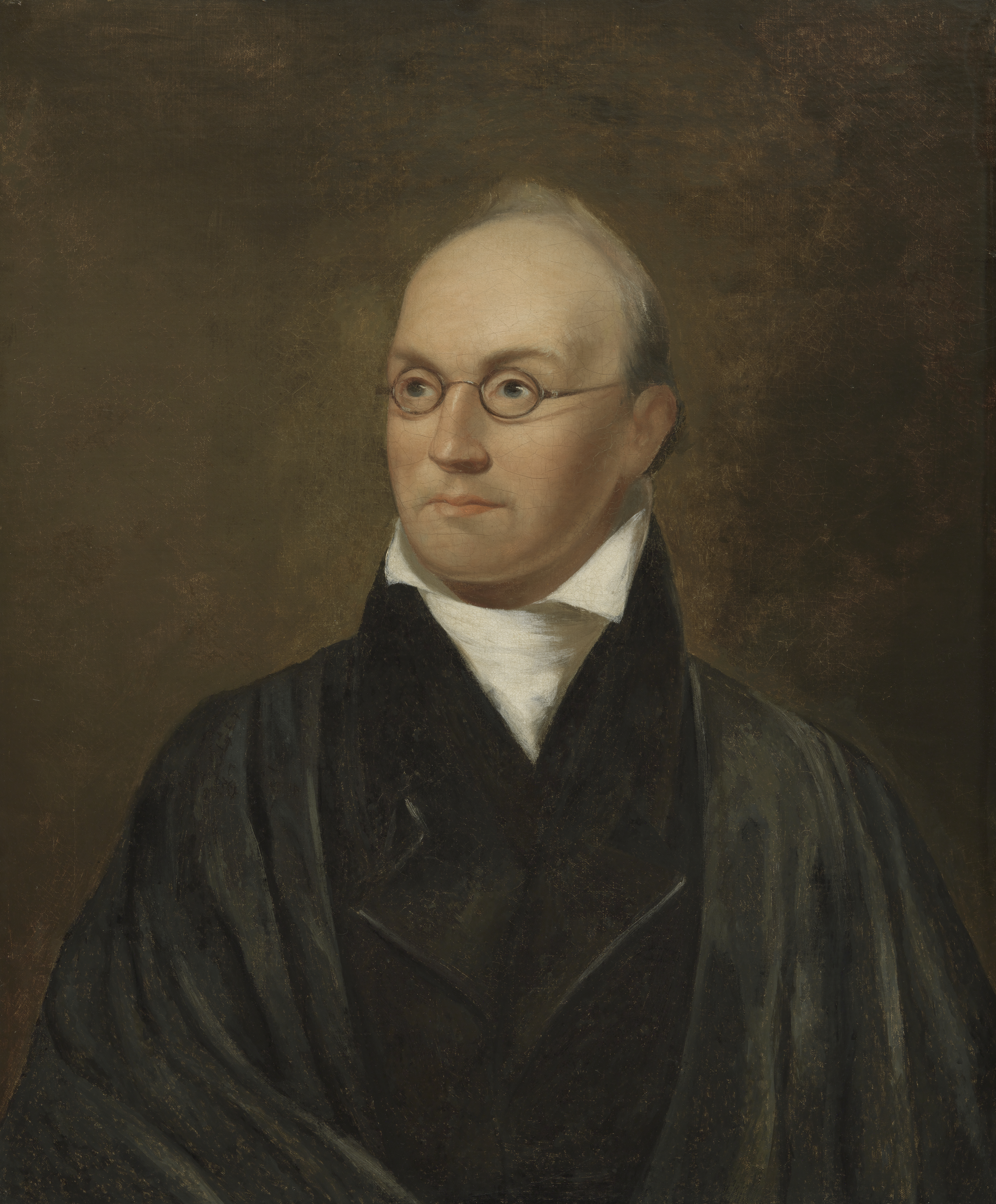
Justice Joseph Story in 1827

Perhaps following the example of Marshall's Life of Washington, Story begins his first book with a general history of the American colonies. Story has a chapter on Maine, but he does not have one on Vermont.

=== Book II ===
In the second book, Story discusses the history of the American Revolution and the Confederation and highlights the shortcomings of the Articles of Confederation.

=== Book III ===
In the first three chapters of the third book, Story gives a short history of the origin and adoption of the United States Constitution, the objections to the Constitution, and the nature of the Constitution – whether it is a compact between sovereign states, or the supreme and national law of the United States. In Chapter 4, Story enters into a discourse on "who is the final judge, or interpreter, in Constitutional controversies." In Chapter 5, Story gives his nineteen rules of interpretation of the Constitution.

Chapters 6 through 43 deal with all the provisions of the original Constitution of the United States. Chapter 25 deals with the constitutionality of a national bank. Chapter 26 deals with the authority of Congress to make roads, canals, and other internal improvements. Chapter 44 deals with the Amendments to the Constitution. At the time of writing, only twelve Amendments had been ratified. Story does not discuss the Eleventh Amendment or Twelfth Amendment, and instead considers only the Bill of Rights.

Chapter 45 contains Story's concluding remarks:

Many reflections naturally crowd upon the mind at such a moment,—many grateful recollections of the past, and many anxious thoughts of the future. The past is secure. It is unalterable. The seal of eternity is upon it. The wisdom which it has displayed and the blessings which it has bestowed, cannot be obscured; neither can they be debased by human folly or human infirmity. The future is that which may well awaken the most earnest solicitude, both for the virtue and the permanence of our republic. The fate of other republics—their rise, their progress, their decline, and their fall—are written but too legibly on the pages of history, if indeed they were not continually before us in the startling fragments of their ruins. They have perished, and perished by their own hands. Prosperity has enervated them, corruption has debased them, and a venal populace has consummated their destruction.

Justice Story added an appendix to the second volume of the 1833 edition where he quotes President Andrew Jackson's December 10, 1832, Proclamation which deals with South Carolina's Nullification Laws. This appendix appears at the end of the first volume of the second, third, fourth and fifth editions.

To the fourth edition, published in 1873 by Little, Brown & Co., Thomas M. Cooley added three chapters dealing with the emancipation of the slaves, the Fourteenth Amendment and impartial suffrage.

== Editions ==
- 1833 – Joseph Story (1833), Commentaries on the Constitution of the United States; with a Preliminary Review of the Constitutional History of the Colonies and States, before the Adoption of the Constitution. By Joseph Story, LL.D. Dane Professor of Law in Harvard University. In Three Volumes, Boston; Cambridge, Mass.: Hilliard, Gray, and Company; Brown, Shattuck, and Co., OCLC 3826953. In A Catalogue of Law Books, Published and for Sale by Charles C. Little and James Brown (1846), a copy of this edition was indicated to cost $12.00.
  - Volume I.
  - Volume II.
  - Volume III.
- 1851 – Second Edition, edited by Story's son, William Wetmore Story, Boston: Charles C. Little and James Brown.
  - Volume I.
  - Volume II.
- 1858 – Third Edition, by E. H. Bennett, Boston: Little, Brown and Company.
  - Volume I.
  - Volume II.
- 1873 – Fourth Edition, edited by Thomas Cooley, Boston: Little, Brown and Company. Two volumes. In John Parsons' Catalogue of Law Books (1880) a copy of this edition costs $12.00.
  - Volume I.
  - Volume II.
- 1891 – Fifth Edition, edited by Melville Bigelow, Boston: Little, Brown, and Company.

=== Abridgements ===
Story published an abridgement of his Commentaries "for the Use of Colleges and High Schools." In A Catalogue of Law Books, Published and for Sale by Charles C. Little and James Brown (1846), a copy of this abridgement was indicated to cost $3.00. Story's Abridgment may well have been even more influential than his three-volume work, because the Abridgment saw a much larger audience. The Abridgment was required reading at Harvard and in other academic settings.

Story published The Constitutional Class Book: being a brief exposition of the Constitution of the United States. Boston: Hilliard, Gray and Company, 1834.

A Familiar Exposition of the Constitution was published in Boston by Marsh, Capen, Lyon and Webb in 1840. Thomas Webb published an edition in 1842, and Harpers published many reprints starting in 1847.

== Reception and enduring reputation ==
In correspondence Chancellor James Kent wrote to Story on June 19, 1833: "I have just now risen from the completion of that duty, and I owe it to you and to myself to say, that I have been delighted and instructed from the beginning to the end of the work. It is a most profound, learned, acute, and excellent production, distinguished for its accuracy, fulness, and judgment. Every topic is discussed in a masterly manner. It is complete and perfect throughout, and carries the head and heart captive through every page. It is written with admirable beauty and elegance of style, and under the glow and fervor of patriotism, eloquence, and truth."

Chief Justice John Marshall wrote to Story on July 31, 1833: "I have finished reading your great work, and wish it could be read by every statesman, and every would-be statesman in the United States. It is a comprehensive and an accurate commentary on our Constitution, formed in the spirit of the original text."

Robert von Mohl, of the University of Tübingen, speaking of it in the Kritische Zeitschrift, said: "We have in this work, as perfect and excellent a Commentary on the North American Public Law, as can be produced by deep and profound reflection, acute logic, extensive knowledge of the national condition and writings, and just political views. Professor Story, by his able and diligent labors, has, without doubt, done a great service, not only to his countrymen, but also, and in a still higher degree, to the European publicists, among whom his name will receive an honorable fame, as readily awarded as it will be enduring!"

Reviews in the press were laudatory, especially the reviews in American Quarterly Review, The American Jurist, The American Monthly Review, and the North American Review.

Thomas M. Cooley, in his prefatory essay to his edition of William Blackstone's Commentaries on the Laws of England, wrote in 1871 "upon the subject of the federal constitution, no work yet supersedes the elaborate treatise of Mr. Justice Story; though if it were re-written in view of recent events and authorities, it might be made much more valuable, and be largely increased in interest to those who shall hereafter read it." Cooley himself edited and added chapters and notes to the fourth edition of Story's Commentaries.

This is not to say that Story's Commentaries met with universal approval. They were attacked by Southern writers such as Henry St. George Tucker, Sr., John Randolph Tucker, and Abel Parker Upshur. According to Kent Newmyer, "[t]hat Story was the focal point of Southern animus only testified to his prominence as the authority on the Constitution." H. Jefferson Powell, in "Joseph Story's Commentaries on the Constitution: A Belated Review" first published in the Yale Law Journal, quotes Upshur's opinion that the Commentaries were "mere dogmas", and John Calhoun's opinion that Story's Commentaries were essentially false and dangerous.

=== Reputation in the law ===
Story's Commentaries have been cited in hundreds of cases before state and federal courts where constitutional issues are decided.
