= Diana Kirschner =

American psychologist

Diana Adile Kirschner
- Born: 1948 (age 77–78)
- Scientific career
- Fields: Psychology, comprehensive family therapy

Diana Adile Kirschner (born 1948) is an American psychologist and author. Early in her career she was involved in the field of integrative psychotherapy, a movement that seeks to find the best practices from among the major schools of therapy. Kirschner's work involved integrating individual therapy, couples therapy, and family therapy into an approach called Comprehensive Family Therapy. The book she coauthored, Comprehensive Family Therapy, was nominated by the American Psychological Association as one of the 100 most important books on family psychology.

== Work ==
Kirschner has written extensively on psychotherapy integration, couples and family therapy, the treatment of sexual abuse, and the role of psychologists in family-owned businesses and the media. Her chapter on Comprehensive Family Therapy was included in the two-volume survey and history of the field, Voices in Family Psychology. Various texts on integrative psychotherapy have included Kirschner's work on treating couples and families, the process of change, the diagnosis of post-traumatic stress disorder in incest survivors in the context of family dysfunction, and the treatment of difficult children.

Kirschner was a founding member of the editorial board and contributor to the Journal of Couples Therapy. She was also a founding faculty member and director of the Pennsylvania-based Institute for Comprehensive Family Therapy, a non-profit, postgraduate mental health training and treatment center whose certificate program in marriage and family therapy was accredited by the American Association for Marriage and Family Therapy.

=== Major contributions ===
A past focus of Kirschner's research has been the impact of the marital relationship on children's functioning and the common underlying characteristics of healthy marriages. Kirschner hypothesized the existence of a set of critical variables impacting children's well-being and social functioning, as well as the existence of a link between the quality of the marital relationship and everyday marital conflict and the way the spouses reared the child. Recent studies have validated this correlation. In a 2002 study of over 2,500 married parents with a child under 18 living at home, researchers found that marital conflict had a direct impact on children's problems, was related to more frequent use of harsh discipline, and increased the level of conflict between parents and adolescents. Kirschner's findings regarding the impact of marital conflict on children's adjustment are relevant to the "nature vs. nurture" controversy. Cummings and Davies reported similar results.

Kirschner also hypothesized the existence of common characteristics among relationally healthy or highly satisfied couples. She interpreted Tolstoy's opening line from Anna Karenina, "Happy families are all alike; every unhappy family is unhappy in its own way", as an observation that happy couples and families share characteristics. Kirschner asserted that relational success derived from a commitment by the spouses to help each other grow and develop. Experiments showed that high-satisfaction couples enjoyed spending time alone more than couples reporting medium or low relational satisfaction. Kirschner also found that successful couples and families learned to handle conflicts skillfully to prevent lingering resentment. Two decades of empirical research summarized by Gottman and Silver (1999), Olson and Flowers (over 6,000 couples studied, 1993) and a metanalysis by Bradbury, Fincham, and Beach (2000) have validated Kirschner's ideas and confirmed the relational importance of commitment, conflict resolution skills, desire to spend time with each other, sexual fidelity, and lack of violence.

Kirschner's 2011 work, Sealing the Deal: The Love Mentor's Guide to Lasting Love, discusses the influence that partners in a relationship can have on each other. Specifically, that "affirmation from one partner to the target partner increases the target’s belief that his partner understands and approves of him and genuinely cares about his growth and fulfillment". Kirschner's theory of mutual influence has been borne out by the work of other psychologists, and has been termed "the Michelangelo phenomenon".

Kirschner was co-editor of the American Psychological Association's first book devoted to psychology and the media. She focused on the impact of violence in the media on children; gender discrimination and ageism in television and other media; as well as on the roles psychologists play in the mass media.

=== Current work ===
Kirschner also stars in Love in 90 Days: Finding Your Own True Love, a one-woman Amazon Prime Video release, which was formerly a PBS Pledge Special devoted to love relationships and dating. She appeared regularly on The Today Show as a guest psychologist. Dr. Kirschner and her team of dating coaches and relationship coaches work with women and men from around the world. Her work has been written up in The New York Times and The Wall Street Journal. Kirschner is a regular contributor to Psychology Today.

== Publications ==
- Kirschner, D.A. & Kirschner, S. (1986). Comprehensive Family Therapy. New York: Brunner-Mazel. ISBN 0-87630-403-X.
- Kirschner, S., Kirschner, D.A. & Rappaport, R.L. (1993). Working with Adult Incest Survivors: The Healing Journey. New York: Brunner-Mazel. ISBN 0-87630-691-1.
- Kirschner, S. & Kirschner, D.A. (Eds.) (1997). Perspectives on Psychology and the Media. Washington: American Psychological Association. ISBN 1-55798-433-6.
- Kirschner, D. A. (2004). Opening Love's Door: The Seven Lessons. Lincoln, Nebraska: iUniverse. ISBN 0-595-33386-9.
- Kirschner, D. (2005). The Ultimate Guide to Getting the Love You Want. Amazon Shorts. ASIN B000BO0M30.
- Kirschner, D.A. (2009). Love in 90 Days: The Essential Guide to Finding Your Own True Love. New York: Center Street, Hachette Book Group. ISBN 1-59995-122-3.
- Kirschner, D.A. (2011). Sealing the Deal: The Love Mentor's Guide to Lasting Love. New York: Center Street, Hachette Book Group. ISBN 1-59995-120-7.
- Kirschner, D.A. (2013). Find Your Soulmate Online in Six Simple Steps (The Love Mentor's Guide) [Kindle Edition]. New York: Amazon Publishing. ASIN B00AQ3ATZM.
- Kirschner, D.A. (2013). 30 Days To Love: The Ultimate Relationship Turnaround Guide (The Love Mentor's Guide) [Kindle Edition]. New York: Amazon Publishing. ASIN B00BPDUIY4.
- Kirschner, D.A. (2014). The Diamond Self Secret [Kindle Edition]. New York: Amazon Publishing. ASIN B00GS9KME6.
- Kirschner, D.A. (2019). Love in 90 Days: The Essential Guide to Finding Your Own True Love. New York: Center Street, Hachette Book Group. Revised Edition. ISBN 1546084894.

== See also ==
- Dating coach
- Integrative psychotherapy
- Family therapy
- Michelangelo phenomenon
- Martin Buber
- Media psychology
