= Michelangelo phenomenon =

Psychological interpersonal process

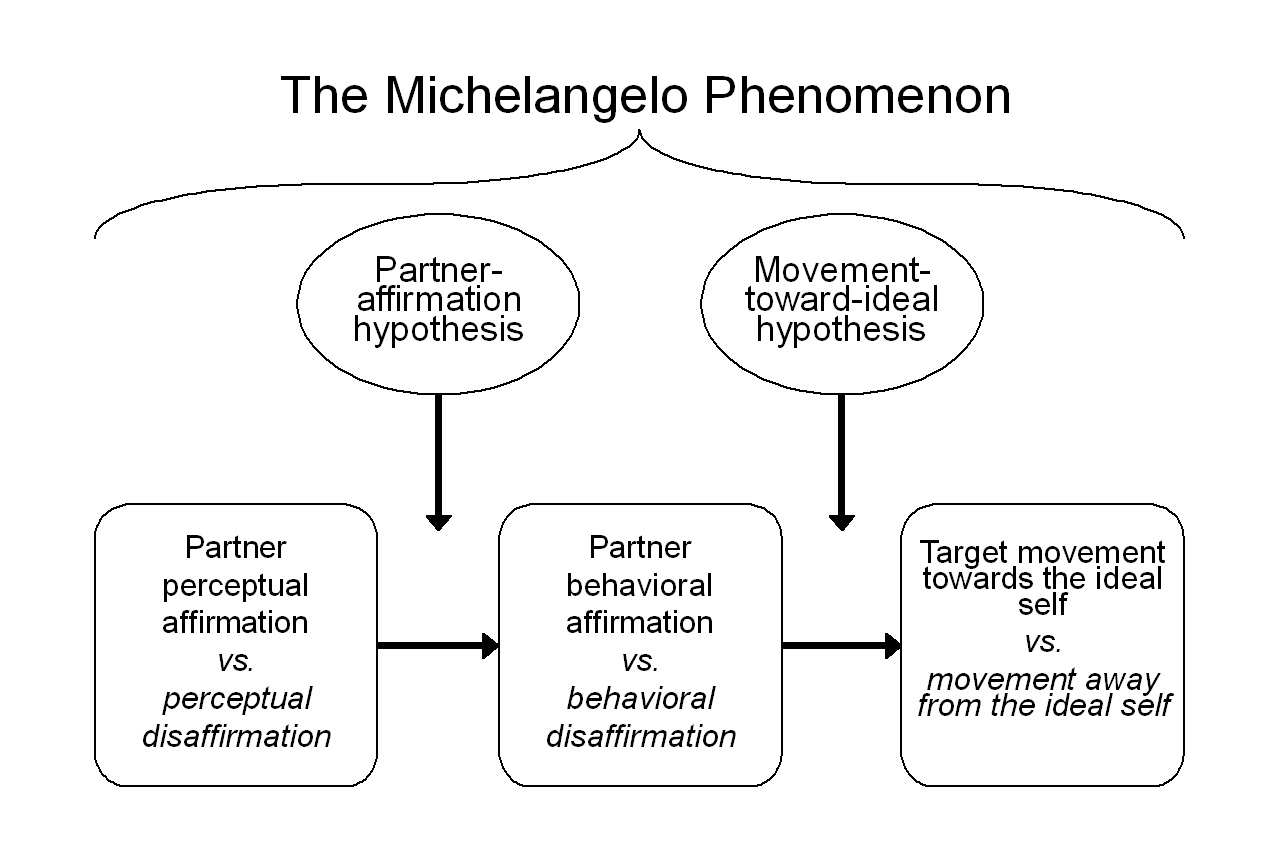
The Michelangelo phenomenon

The Michelangelo phenomenon is an interpersonal process observed by psychologists in which close, romantic partners influence or 'sculpt' each other. Over time, the Michelangelo effect causes individuals to develop towards what they consider their "ideal selves". This happens because their partner sees them and acts around them in ways that promote this ideal.

Diana Kirschner reported that the phenomenon was common among couples reporting high levels of marital satisfaction.

The Michelangelo phenomenon is related to the looking-glass self concept introduced by Charles Horton Cooley in his 1902 work Human Nature and the Social Order.

== Description of the model ==
The Michelangelo phenomenon describes a three-step process where close partners shape each other so as to bring forth one another's ideal selves. This ideal self is conceptualized as a collection of an individual's "dreams and aspirations" or "the constellation of skills, traits, and resources that an individual ideally wishes to acquire." These span different domains, such as one's profession, relationship, health, and personality. An example of an ideal self is one that includes "completing medical school, becoming more sociable, or learning to speak fluent Dutch." This is different from the actual self, which consists of attributes the self currently possesses and the ought self, which consists of attributes the self feels obligated to possess. Note that in this article, the "self" refers to a specific, target individual.

Although the self does not experience growth in complete isolation of the influence of others, much research on self-growth prior to 1999 consisted of examining individual processes. Research into the influence of others was neglected, even though those that the self interacts with most regularly can lead to more constant, stable changes in disposition and behavior. People are motivated to work towards growth.

The three core parts of the phenomenon are as follows: partner perceptual affirmation, partner behavioral affirmation, and self-movement toward the ideal self.

=== Components ===
Partner affirmation appears in the model as two different parts. Partner affirmation names how partners bring about aspects of the ideal self from the self. Partner perceptual affirmation describes how a partner's views of the self aligns with the self's view of their ideal self. A partner will show greater partner perceptual affirmation if they believe the self to be, or to be capable of being, the ideal self. In other words, Jay will show more perceptual affirmation if he sees his partner Kaylee, whose ideal self includes being competent at piano, as actually competent at piano or as capable of being competent at piano. Partner behavioral affirmation describes how a partner acts in a way that aligns with the ideal self. A partner, such as Jay, will show more partner behavioural affirmation if they act in a way such that Kaylee's ideal self can come forward, such as if he drives Kaylee to piano lessons. Self-movement toward the ideal self describes how the distance between the self and ideal self closes. Kaylee will experience self-movement toward the ideal self when she becomes more competent at piano.

Note that both perceptual and behavioural aspects of partner affirmation can take place consciously or unconsciously. For example, someone with a partner who wants to be more sociable may consciously encourage them to spend more time with their friends, in an effort to help them meet this goal. This is conscious behavioural affirmation. On the other hand, knowing that sociability is a goal of their partner, someone may feel less apprehension when organising a social gathering in their space. This would inadvertently give the partner an opportunity to socialise and is an example of unconscious behavioural affirmation.

These three components come together under two hypotheses which are part of the Michelangelo phenomenon. The partner affirmation hypothesis says that the more a partner's view of the self aligns with the ideal self, the more that partner will act in a way to bring out that ideal self. For example, the more Jay views Kaylee as being competent at piano, the more he will do things to elicit that view by way of positively enforcing her piano achievements or supporting her piano lessons. The movement toward ideal hypothesis says that the more the partner behaves in a way aligned with the ideal self, the more the self will become more like their ideal self. The more Jay acts in a way that aligns with Kaylee's ideal self of being competent at piano, the more Kaylee will increasingly become competent at piano.

=== Variations in sculpting and related phenomena ===
An affirming partner may shape someone through a series of selection mechanisms:

- Retroactive selection in which an individual reinforces behaviours of their partner by punishing or rewarding them
- Preemptive selection wherein an individual initiates an interaction that promotes certain behaviours in their partner
- Situation selection where an individual creates a situation in which the elicitation of desired partner behaviours is probable

To add to these three types, other more specific examples of ideal-self-affirming behaviors a partner can enact includes expressing approval of the self's efforts toward goals and offering support such as strategy improvement tips.

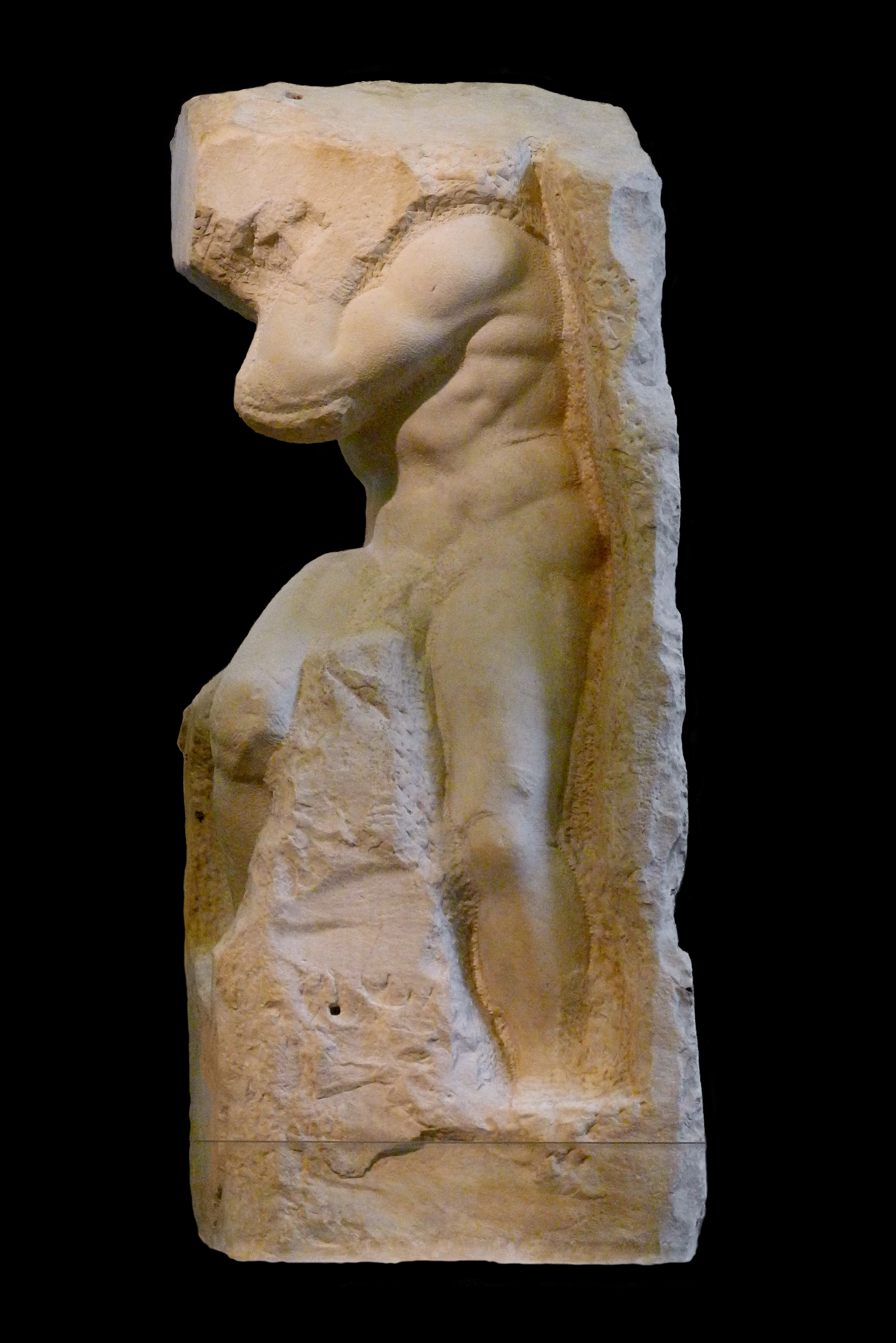
Atlas Slave, a sculpture by Michelangelo

Note that not all of a partner's acts to reinforce certain qualities counts as affirming or, to be more specific, ideal-self-affirming. Exploring related phenomena can further clarify what partner affirmation is not. Partner enhancement is when a partner acts in a way that is more so positive than reflective of objective reality. For example, Jay acts toward Kaylee as if she is the best piano player, even if the average piano instructor would rate her as simply decent at piano. There is partner verification, which involves the partner reinforcement of qualities that the target, or self, believes to be true already. An example would be if Jay laughs at Kaylee's jokes and, subtly, reinforces the conception she has of herself as a funny person.

Note that on another part of this spectrum, a partner may not affirm the self's ideal and may instead reinforce an ideal that does not belong to the self or that is the opposite of the self's ideal.

There is, for example, the Pygmalion phenomenon, where the partner attempts to sculpt the target to align with their ideals rather than the target's ideals. For example, this would occur if Jay, who differently from Kaylee seeks to be a regular voter, behaves in a way to draw out that quality of consistent voting behavior in Kaylee.

Movement away from the ideal self may occur for Kaylee if Jay supported, for example, Kaylee's rare endeavors in binge drinking, a high-risk behavior antithetical to her ideal self as a healthy person. Other ways an individual may disaffirm their partner is "by communicating indifference, pessimism, or disapproval, by undermining [their] ideal pursuits, or by affirming qualities that are antithetical to [their] ideal self." This disaffirmation may occur passively, in the failure to affirm, or actively, in disaffirmation.

=== The metaphor ===
The phenomenon is named after the Italian Renaissance painter, sculptor, architect, poet and engineer Michelangelo (1475-1564). Michelangelo "described sculpting as a process whereby the artist released a hidden figure from the block of stone in which it slumbered." The metaphor of chipping away at a block of stone to reveal the 'ideal form' is extended, in this context, to close relationships. According to the Michelangelo phenomenon, a person will be 'sculpted' into their self-conceived ideal form by their partner. The metaphor and term was first introduced by the US psychologist Stephen Michael Drigotas (et al.) in 1999.

== Effects ==
=== Couple well-being ===
Drigotas et al. (1999) found support for their couple well being hypothesis, which states that greater self movement toward the ideal self is linked to greater functioning and health within the couple. Partner affirmation is generally beneficial to relationships as it increases perceived responsiveness, which increases the self's trust in their partner and the self's commitment.

There is also a benefit Drigotas et al. (1999) found where, across four studies, individuals who helped sculpt their partners to resemble the partner's ideal selves experienced movement towards their own ideal self as well. With Jay and Kaylee, this might look like Jay experiencing becoming more like his ideal of being a supportive teammate the more he helps Kaylee attain her ideal self.

=== Individual well-being ===
Drigotas found support that the Michelangelo phenomenon is strongly linked to personal well-being across varied dimensions such as life satisfaction, self esteem, and loneliness. The distance between our actual self, or current attributes, and ideal self impacts emotions such that a smaller distance engenders joy and a larger distance engenders emotions like sadness. Further, it is the specific aspect of partner behavioral affirmation that predicts personal well being, and not the general relationship satisfaction that comes about as an effect of processes in the Michelangelo phenomenon.

== Factors ==
Several different factors relating to attributes of either the individual (the self) and the individual's partner (the partner) contribute varying effects on various components of the phenomenon.

=== Ideal similarity ===
Ideal similarity can be defined as the alignment of a partner to the self's ideal self. Higher ideal similarity means there is a greater match between the partner's attributes and the ideal self's attributes. Higher ideal similarity is linked to higher partner affirmation, self movement toward the ideal self, and couple well being, vitality, adjustment.

The effects of ideal similarity go beyond the realm of close partners as well. When individuals, or targets, were exposed to an experimental partner who was manipulated to resemble the targets' ideal selves, their perceptions of themselves and their partners increased such that targets thought themselves to be more capable of moving toward their ideal self and that partners were not only more affirming in the targets' minds, but were more attractive and generally more desirable interaction partners.

=== Locomotion vs. assessment orientations ===
These two traits revolve around multiple parts of goal pursuit, including selection of the goal, evaluation of the goal, and pursuit of the goal. Locomotion orientation describes the inclination of an individual to take action to reach their goals. Those more inclined toward locomotion tend to focus on quickly accomplishing realistic goals and tend to have more positive affect. Assessment orientation describes the inclination of an individual to focus more so on evaluation in their goal pursuit, rather than action. Those more inclined toward assessment tend to focus on dissecting goals, analyzing how to obtain those goals and tend to have more negative affect as well as more sensitivity to how far they have to go to reach their goals.

An individual's orientation impacts processes in the Michelangelo phenomenon. The orientation not only impacts the target's goal selection and pursuit, but how their partner affirms the target in their efforts and how the target affirms their own partner in their efforts. Specifically, individuals with locomotion orientations, as opposed to assessment orientations, seem more receptive to being sculpted; those with assessment orientations seem less receptive to being sculpted. As the partners who are sculpting, partners with locomotion as opposed to assessment orientations reported being more affirming of their partners' goal pursuits such that the targets were perceived to experience greater movement toward their ideal self.

=== Other individual attributes ===
Rusbult et al. (2005) speculate that there are three individual attributes which lead to increased self-movement toward the ideal self. These include insight or a solid construction of one's ideal and actual self, ability which includes skills and attributes like goal-relevant planning that are relevant to pursuit of the goal, and motivation to reach the goal, which includes commitment toward achieving the goal.

== Related phenomena ==
=== Growth-as-hell model ===
In contrast, it has been posited by Guggenbühl-Craig that people grow and move towards their ideal selves through disaffirmation, which makes them aware of their flaws and able to overcome them. Much like the Michelangelo phenomenon, this model of self-growth and movement towards the ideal self is understood to occur most potently in close, romantic relationships.

== See also ==
- Symbolic interactionism
- William James
- George Herbert Mead
