= Constitutionality =

Compliance with the principles set forth in a constitution

Constitutionality is the quality of being acceptable under a supreme law with regard to the status of a norm, a procedure, or an act's accordance with the constitution set forth by an applicable jurisdiction. Laws, procedures, or acts that directly violate the constitution are considered unconstitutional. All others are considered constitutional unless deemed otherwise by a legitimate authority and through a legitimate mechanism.

== Applicability ==
An act or statute enacted as law either by a national legislature or by a subordinate-level legislature such as that of a state or province may be declared unconstitutional.

However, governments do not only create laws but also enforce the laws set forth in the document defining the government (the constitution).

When the proper court determines that a legislative act or law conflicts with the constitution, it finds that law unconstitutional and declares it void in whole or in part.

Depending on the type of legal system, a statute may be declared unconstitutional by any court or only by special constitutional courts with authority to rule on the validity of a statute.

In some countries, the legislature may create any law for any purpose, and there is no provision for courts to declare a law unconstitutional. That can occur either because the country has no codified constitution that laws must conform to like in the United Kingdom and New Zealand or because the constitution is codified, but no court has the authority to strike down laws on the basis of it like in the Netherlands and Switzerland. There may be other remedies however, such as how Swiss voters can, by plebiscite, void federal legislation by petitioning for a direct vote of the citizenry as to whether the law should be upheld or not.

In many jurisdictions, the supreme court or constitutional court is the final legal arbiter that renders an opinion on whether a law or an action of a government official is constitutional. Constitutions define the powers of government, Thus, national constitutions typically apply only to government actions. Only governments can then violate the nation's constitution, but there are exceptions.

== Examples of unconstitutional actions ==
Unconstitutional actions include:

- Actions by politicians outside the powers of their constitutionally-established offices
- Actions on behalf of the government that prevent an individual from exercising constitutionally-protected individual rights

== See also ==
- Constitutional law
- Judicial review
- Unconstitutional constitutional amendment
