= Thomas M. Cooley =

American judge (1824–1898)

Thomas McIntyre Cooley
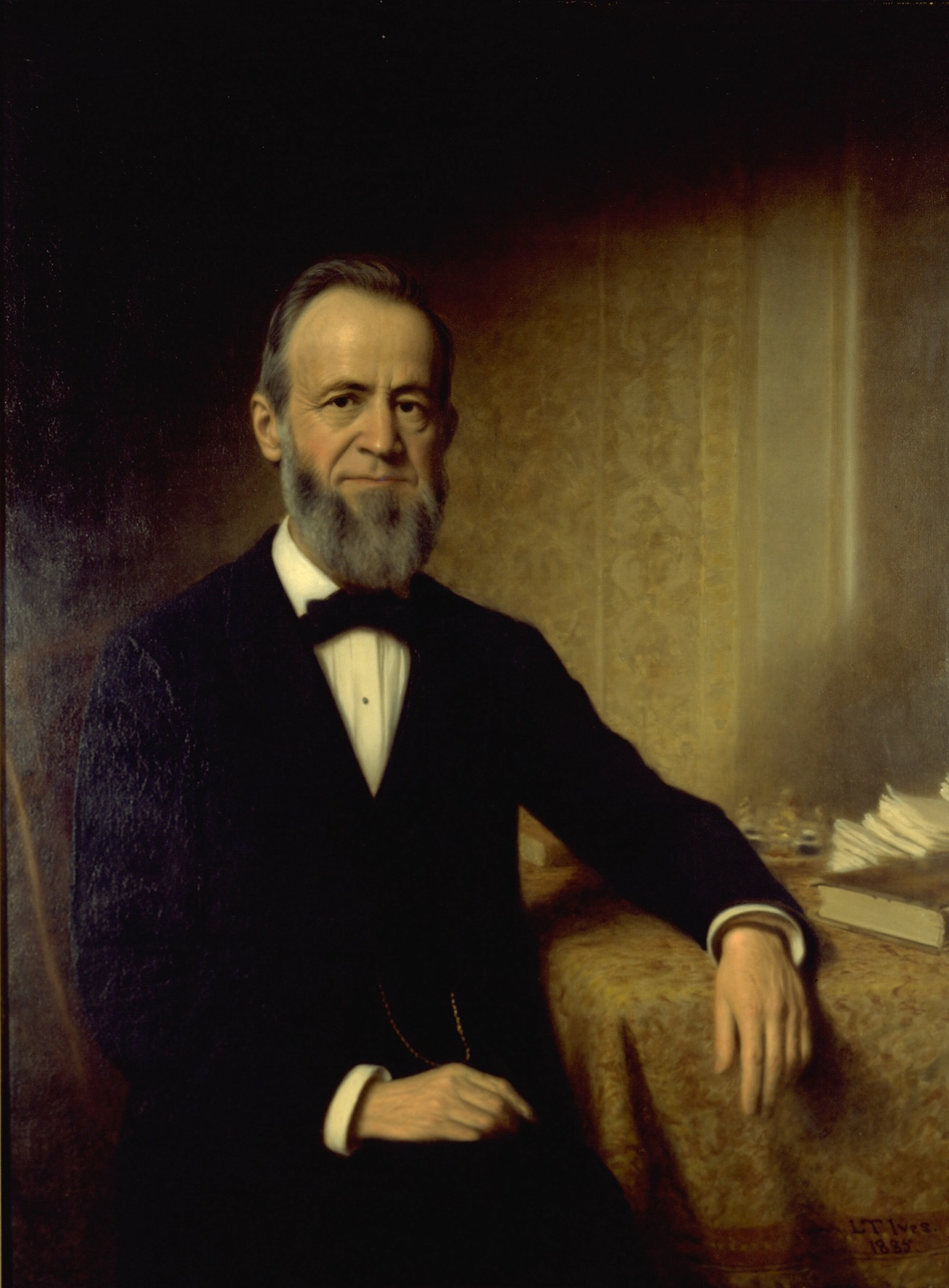
- 1885 portrait

Justice of the Michigan Supreme Court
- In office 1864–1885
- Preceded by: Randolph Manning
- Succeeded by: Allen B. Morse

2nd Dean of University of Michigan Law School
- In office 1871–1883
- Preceded by: James V. Campbell
- Succeeded by: Charles A. Kent

Personal details
- Born: January 6, 1824 Attica, New York, U.S.
- Died: September 12, 1898 (aged 74) Ann Arbor, Michigan, U.S.
- Occupation: professor, lawyer, jurist

Thomas McIntyre Cooley (January 6, 1824 – September 12, 1898) was an American jurist who served on the Michigan Supreme Court from 1864 to 1885, presiding as its Chief Justice for his final year. He also served as the first chairman of the Interstate Commerce Commission.

Cooley was one of the first three faculty members of the University of Michigan Law School and served as its dean from 1871 to 1883. During his tenure, he published widely read treatises on constitutional, taxation, and tort law. Cooley Law School is named in his honor.

== Early life and career ==
Thomas McIntyre Cooley was born on January 6, 1824, in Attica, New York, to Thomas Cooley and Rachel Hubbard who had come from Massachusetts to take up farming. He was the tenth of fifteen children in a family aligned with the Democratic Party. While his father sought to have Cooley join the family farm, his mother encouraged him to continue studying Latin at Attica Academy. In 1842, he began studying law under Theron G. Strong in Palmyra, New York. After continuing to study with the law firm Tiffany & Beman in Adrian, Michigan, Cooley passed the bar in 1846.

From 1848 to 1854, Cooley partnered with the firm Beman & Beecher in Adrian, while also serving as commissioner of the circuit court, village recorder, and editor of the local newspaper, the Adrian Watchtower. In 1854, he briefly entered the real estate business in Toledo, Ohio, but after losing an election to become the city's district judge, he returned to Adrian to partner with future governor Charles Croswell. In 1848, Cooley wrote poems criticizing slavery and co-founded the Michigan chapter of the Free Soil Party, and in 1856, he switched to the Republican Party based on its promotion of legal equality.

In 1857, the Michigan Legislature appointed Cooley as compiler of its statutes. His success in that role led the Michigan Supreme Court to appoint him as its reporter of decisions. In 1859, the newly established University of Michigan Law School chose Cooley as one of its first three faculty members, and he continued teaching until 1884. Cooley designed the curriculum to follow Joseph Story's approach at Harvard Law School of lecture-based instruction.

== Academic works ==
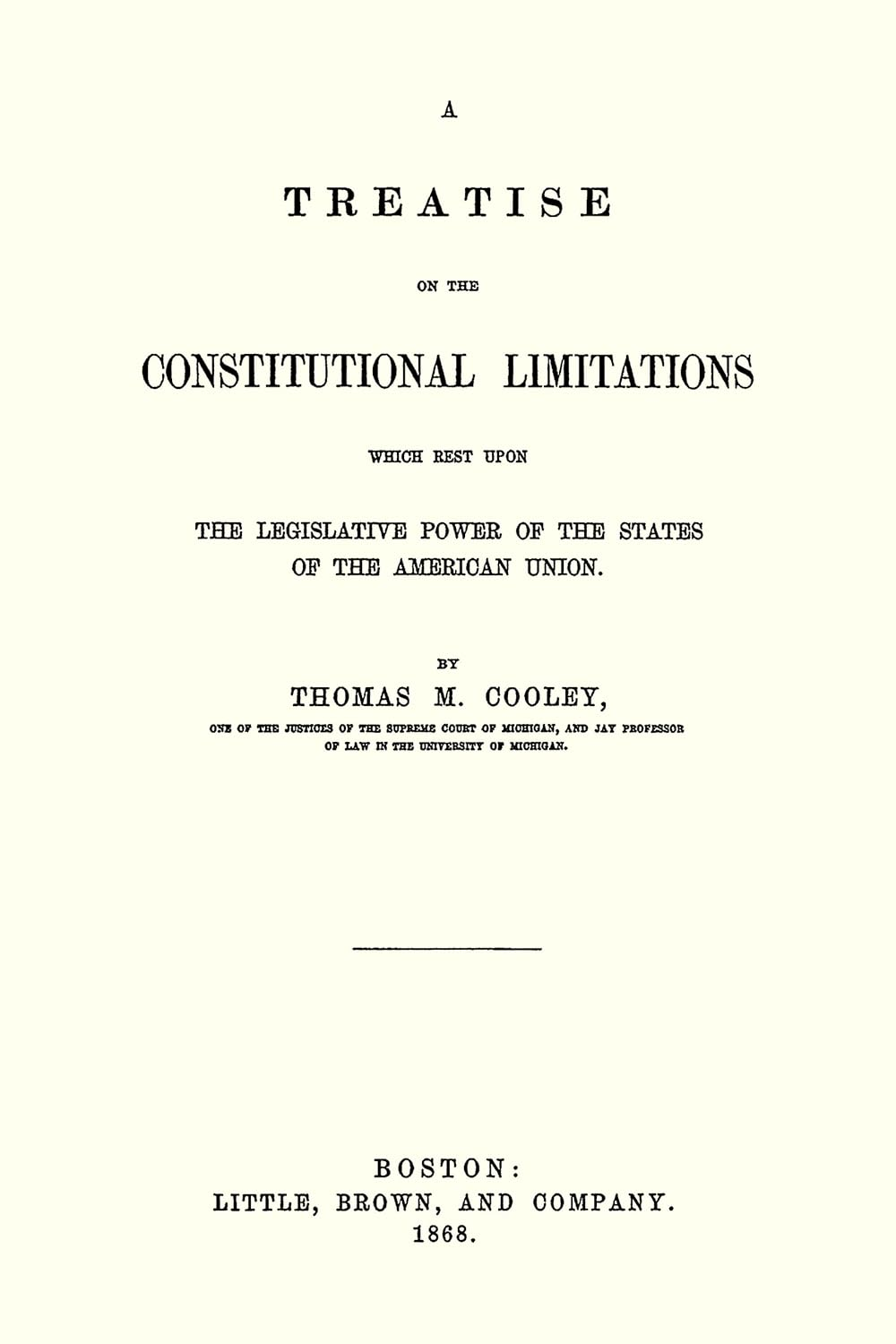
First edition cover of Cooley's A Treatise on the Constitutional Limitations (1885)

When the University of Michigan Law School's first three professors divided the curriculum between themselves, Cooley was assigned to constitutional law. Summarizing his lectures, Cooley published A Treatise on the Constitutional Limitations Which Rest Upon the Legislative Power of the States of the American Union (often shortened to Constitutional Limitations) in 1868. In this treatise, Cooley argued that while the Constitution of the United States delegated significant authority to state governments, George Washington and John Adams claimed greater federal authority in practice, while the Civil War further developed a national identity.

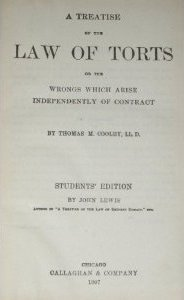
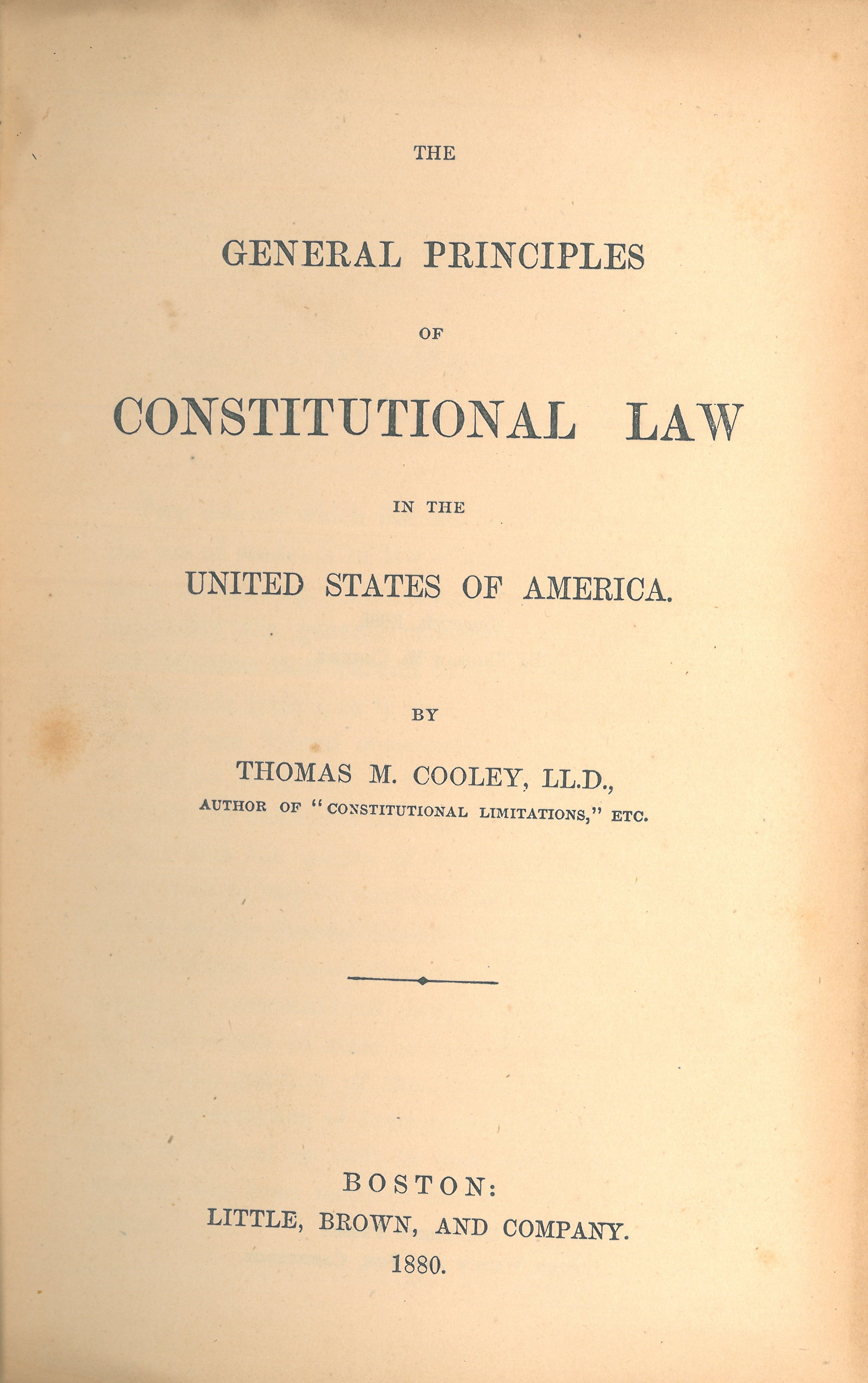
Title pages of Cooley's Treatise on the Law of Torts (1907) and General Principles of Constitutional Law (1880)

In 1870, Cooley published an edited edition of William Blackstone's Commentaries on the Laws of England, followed by an updated edition of Story's Commentaries on the Constitution of the United States in 1874 that addressed the Reconstruction Amendments. Returning to original works, Cooley published A Treatise on the Law of Taxation Including the Law of Local Assessments in 1876, A Treatise on the Law of Torts or the Wrongs Which Arise Independently of Contract in 1879, and The General Principles of Constitutional Law in the United States of America in 1880. His torts treatise was written as an update to judge Francis Hilliard's 1859 The Law of Torts or Private Wrongs, the first American treatise on tort law, in response to increasing tort litigation over occupational injury.

In 1893, Cooley published a widely-cited article in Forum entitled "Grave Obstacles to Hawaiian Annexation." This article argued against American imperialism as unconstitutional and racially divisive. Using his reputation as a constitutional law scholar, Cooley later opposed the Newlands Resolution, which annexed Hawaii, as exceeding Congress' treaty-making authority.

Aside from regularly writing in law reviews across the country, Cooley spoke before the American Bar Association and state bar associations of Georgia, New York, South Carolina, and Tennessee, producing widely published speeches. Beyond his legal writing, Cooley also published a book on the history of Michigan and an article on the Louisiana Purchase.

== Michigan Supreme Court ==
Cooley served on the Michigan Supreme Court from January 1865 to October 1885, succeeding Randolph Manning. James V. Campbell, Isaac P. Christiancy, Benjamin F. Graves, and Cooley have become known as the "Big Four" for the impact of their decisions on other states across all areas of law during their overlapping tenures. Ironically, all four were born in New York.

Cooley rejected the use of mandamus to force a governor into legal compliance, holding that the public could only address officials' illegal acts by persuading the legislature to pursue impeachment. His "Cooley Doctrine" recognizes an individual right to local government, as opposed to Dillon's Rule, which dictates that local governments only derive their authority from the state legislature. Cooley in 1871 stated, "local government is a matter of absolute right; and the state cannot take it away".

Espousing an early form of rational basis review, Cooley cautioned that laws should only be struck down where clearly unconstitutional. James Bradley Thayer later cited Cooley in favor of this standard, which Oliver Wendell Holmes Jr. and Louis Brandeis implemented in their United States Supreme Court's jurisprudence. In People v. Salem (Mich. 1870), Cooley held that it was unconstitutional for the state to tax the public to fund a privately operated railroad even if the business could boost the regional economy. In other cases, he similarly held that the state could not use eminent domain to transfer private property to private businesses.

In 1869, Cooley ended racial segregation of Detroit schools on statutory grounds, only alluding to the likely unconstitutionality of such discrimination. In 1881, he dissented in a newspaper libel case, advocating the actual malice standard ultimately adopted by the U.S. Supreme Court in New York Times Co. v. Sullivan (1964) for claims brought by public figures.

Cooley supported Michigan's practice of electing its judges, but he detested Thomas R. Sherwood for writing decisions that pandered to voters. In 1872, he considered running as a Liberal Republican for a seat in the House of Representatives but ultimately decided against it. In 1874, he was considered for the Senate seat vacated by Zachariah Chandler, but Isaac P. Christiancy was selected instead. In the 1884 United States elections, Cooley was a Mugwump who supported President Grover Cleveland, alienating his traditional base of Republican Party supporters. He further lost the support of both Detroit newspapers by countering one's opposition to University of Michigan President James Burrill Angell and ruling against the other in a libel case. While Cooley is often referred to as "resigning" his seat, he only did so as a lame duck after being voted out from the Michigan Supreme Court in favor of Allen B. Morse. After losing his seat, Cooley was unable to secure either party's support to be appointed to the U.S. Supreme Court, as he was considered insufficiently committed to both.

== Later career ==
Upon leaving the Michigan Supreme Court, Cooley expected to focus on his academic work, but Judge Walter Q. Gresham appointed him as receiver of the Wabash Railroad in December 1886. Cooley was seen as incorruptible, whereas his predecessors had acted on behalf of the railroad's owner, Jay Gould. In March 1887, Cooley left that position upon his appointment as the inaugural chair of the Interstate Commerce Commission by President Cleveland, who saw Cooley as balanced between the interests of workers and railroads. Following the Burlington railroad strike of 1888, Cooley forced each side to submit a written account of the events to dissuade both sides from further violence. His 1891 recommendation for a worker's compensation program in the rail sector was adopted in the Federal Employers Liability Acts of 1906 and 1908.

Cooley openly criticized the U.S. Supreme Court's holding in Chicago, Milwaukee & St. Paul Railway Co. v. Minnesota (1890) that the rate-making decisions of state agencies would be reviewed de novo by federal courts. Rather than treat such decisions as a question of law, Cooley felt they should be afforded judicial deference. Those criticisms prompted the 1906 Hepburn Act to expand the commission's jurisdiction and make its findings binding on jury determinations. In 1893, Cooley was elected as the 16th President of the American Bar Association.

In 1893, Cooley embraced the unconstitutional constitutional amendment doctrine. Specifically, Cooley argued that a constitutional amendment that transforms the democratic republican form of government of the United States or another country into an aristocracy or a monarchy would not be an amendment, but rather a revolution. Elaborating on this, Cooley wrote that "[t]he fruit grower does not forbid his servants engrafting the witch-hazel or the poisonous sumac on his apple trees; the process is forbidden by a higher and more imperative than any he could declare, and to which no additional force could possibly be given re-enactment under this orders."

== Personal life ==
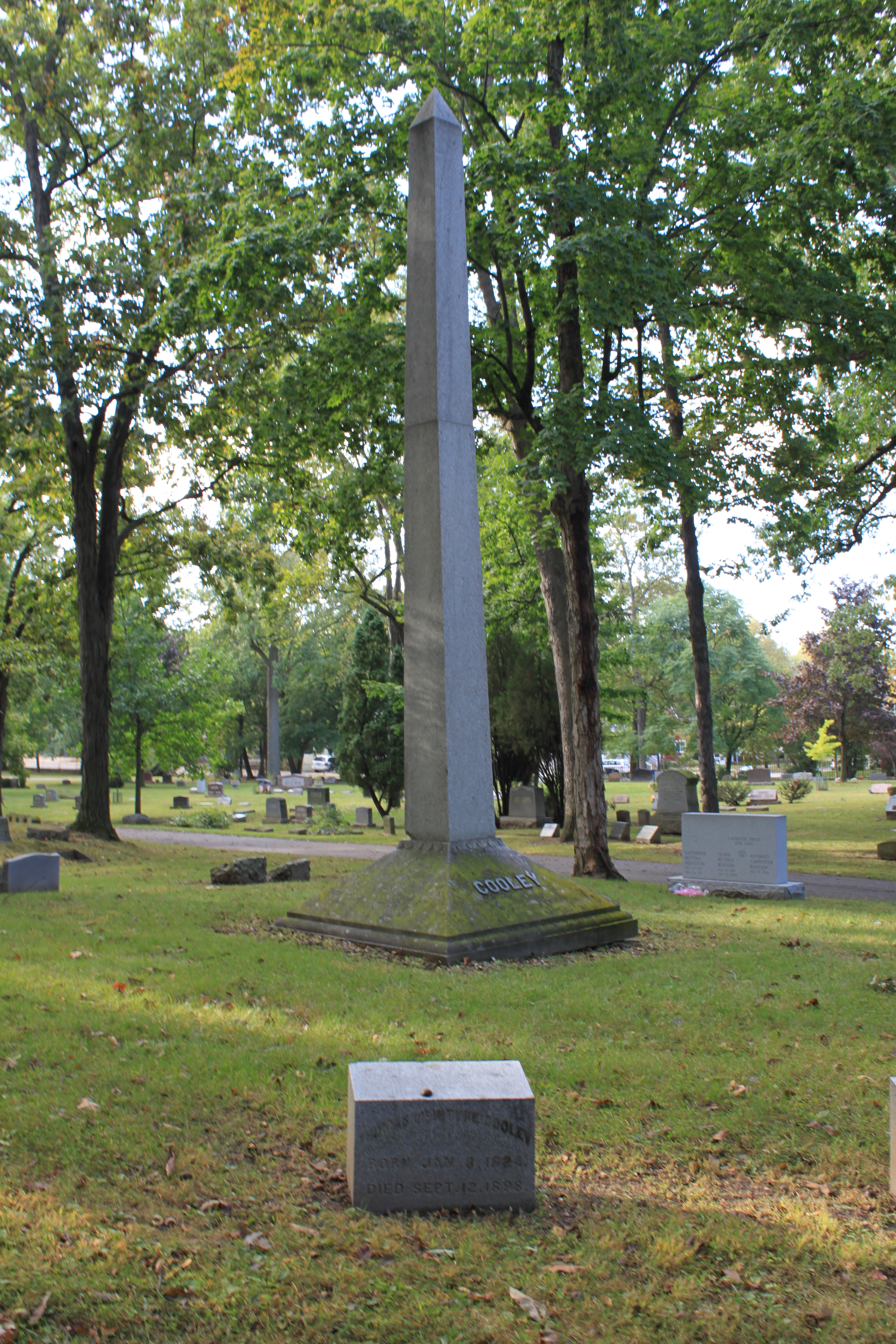
Cooley's grave in front of family obelisk

In December 1846, Cooley married Mary Elizabeth Horton. Together, they had four sons, including sociologist Charles Horton Cooley and pediatrician Thomas Benton Cooley, and two daughters. After the onset of his epilepsy in 1889 and death of his wife in 1890, Cooley began reducing his workload. On September 12, 1898, he died in his home in Ann Arbor, Michigan.

== Legacy ==
During Christopher Columbus Langdell's tenure as dean of Harvard Law School from 1870 to 1895, Langdell instituted the case method for teaching the law of contracts, property, torts, civil procedure, and criminal law. The constitutional law that Cooley had specialized in was excluded from the first-year curriculum because it could not be simplified into doctrine. While Harvard Law awarded Cooley an honorary doctorate during the university's 250th anniversary celebrations in November 1886, the school's rising reputation under Langdell left Cooley's work increasingly obscure.

Cooley's decisions have been further maligned as formalist, in comparison to the legal realism embraced by Holmes and Benjamin N. Cardozo during their tenures on state supreme courts and the U.S. Supreme Court. After the plaintiff in Lochner v. New York (1905) cited Cooley's Constitutional Limitations treatise before the U.S. Supreme Court, Cooley became associated with the Lochner era of courts using substantive due process to invalidate legislation held to infringe on economic liberties. However, political scientist Joseph Postell has rebutted that Cooley affirmed the government's regulatory power through his leadership of the Interstate Commerce Commission.

Established in 1972, Cooley Law School is named in his honor. In 1986, the State Bar of Michigan recognized Cooley's first law office on Maumee Street in Adrian, Michigan, as the state's third legal milestone. Cooley High School in Detroit and Cooley Elementary School in Waterford, Michigan, are named in Cooley's honor.

== Sources ==
- Michigan Supreme Court Historical Society: Thomas McIntyre Cooley
- University of Michigan Law School: History and Traditions: Thomas M. Cooley
- Carrington, Paul D. "The Constitutional Law Scholarship of Thomas McIntyre Cooley" 41 Am. J. Legal Hist. 368 (1997).
- Jones, Alan. "Thomas M. Cooley and the Michigan Supreme Court: 1865–1885", 10 Am. J. Legal Hist. 97 (1966).
