= Looking-glass self =

Sociological term

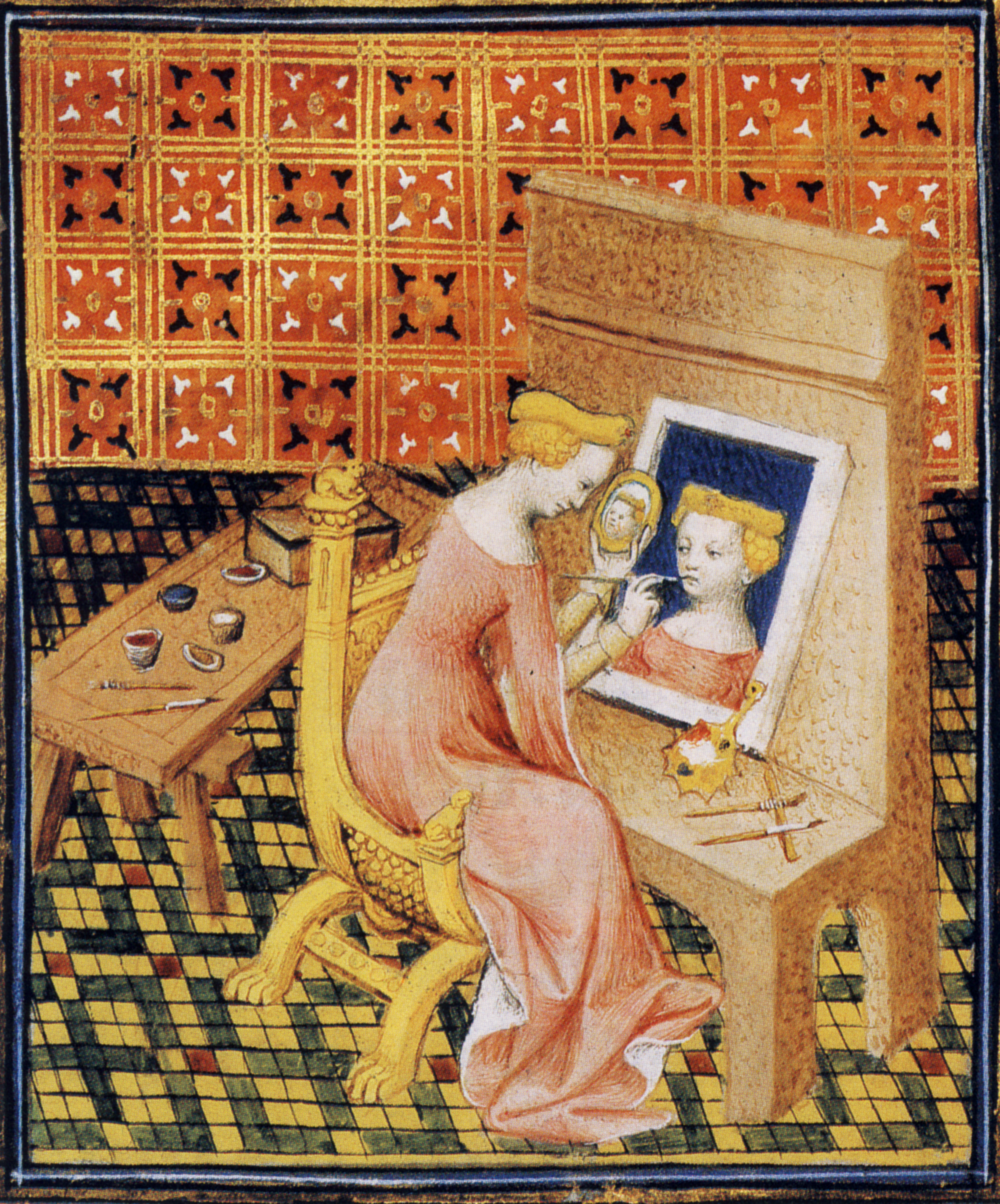
According to the concept of the looking-glass self, an individual's self-perception is shaped by their beliefs about how others perceive them.

The looking-glass self is a concept introduced by American sociologist Charles Horton Cooley in Human Nature and the Social Order (1902). The term describes the process by which individuals develop their self-concept based on their understanding of how others perceive them. According to Cooley, individuals form their self-image by imagining how they appear to others, interpreting others’ reactions, and internalizing these perceptions. This reflective process functions like a mirror, wherein individuals use social interactions to observe themselves indirectly. Over time, these imagined evaluations by others can influence and shape one's self-assessment. Sociologist Lisa McIntyre, in The Practical Skeptic: Core Concepts in Sociology, further elaborates that the looking-glass self encapsulates the tendency for individuals to interpret and understand their identities through the lens of others' perceived judgments.

== Cooley's three steps ==
Cooley takes into account three steps when defining "the looking glass self".

1) The imagination of our appearance from another person's perspective

2) The imagination of person's judgment of us.

3) An emotional reaction such as pride or shame, based on the judgment attributed to the other person.

As a result of the three-step process, individuals may change their behavior based on what they feel other people think about them. In this way, social interaction acts as a "mirror" or a "looking-glass", since one's sense of self and self-esteem is built off of others.

For example, an individual may walk into a job interview with confidence and attempt to display this confidence. A person in this situation most often examines the reactions of the interviewers, to see if they are positively or negatively reacting to it. If the individual notices positive reactions, such as nodding heads or smiles, this might further develop the individual's sense of self-confidence. If the individual notices negative reactions, such as a lack of interest, this confidence in self often becomes shaken and reformed in order to better oneself, even if the perceived judgments were not necessarily true.

== Role in social media ==
The aspects of social media and its relationship with the looking-glass self present a whole range of effects on social media users. Aiken notes that individuals, and particularly teenagers, who are increasingly involved in updating their online personas, risk damaging the development of their real-world self. She also notes that this effect may be even greater among users who display all different sorts of "cyber selves" among different platforms with different purposes, such as between X (previously Twitter), Instagram, and LinkedIn. A social media study also uncovered a host of positive effects of the use of social media and in developing oneself, with dozens of creators citing that producing content gave them a sense of self-confidence and self-worth, enhanced their creativity, increased their sense of professionality, and that their platforms offered a positive space to interact with others.

The negative effects of the looking-glass self can be harmful to the people's mentality. According to Zsolt Unoka and Gabriella Vizin's, To See In a Mirror Dimly. The Looking-Glass is Self-Shaming in Borderline Personality Disorder, shame is a large factor in the development of Borderline Personality Disorder. The feeling of shame and insufficient self-worth comes from traumatic experiences such as abuse, neglect, abandonment, shaming family situations, and harsh upbringing.

According to Susan Harter's, The Perceived Directionality of the Link Between Approval and Self-Worth: The Liabilities of a Looking Glass Self-Orientation Among Young Adolescents, self-worth in adolescents is based mainly on their peer's approval of them. In a world of social media, seeking attention and approval from others is how adolescents determine their self-worth. They create an image of themselves they think others will approve of. This is in close relation to the concept of the looking glass self. Adolescents experience anxiety and depression based on a low opinion of self-worth, and they base this self-worth on other's opinions of them.

=== Family study ===
In another study in the Journal of Family Psychology in 1998, researchers Cook and Douglas measured the validity of the looking glass self and symbolic interaction in the context of familial relationships. The study analyzed the accuracy of a college student's and an adolescent's perceptions of how they are perceived by their parents, surveying mothers, fathers, college students, and adolescents.

=== Social media study ===
In 2015, Julie Jones, a professor at the University of Oklahoma, asked a range of questions to 46 YouTube producers to evaluate how producing in media has positively or negatively affected them. As Jones explains, "digital media can serve as a mediated mirror and social media sites provide the space where others' judgments are clearly posted."

=== Emoji study ===
With the increasing prevalence of online communication in interpersonal relationships, scholarly attention has turned to the role of digital media in shaping self-perception. A systematic literature review by Huang, Hu, and Li (2022) suggested that the concept of the looking-glass self—a person's self-concept developed through interpersonal interactions—can be produced, reinforced, and reshaped through online media platforms.

Emojis and memes serve as visual tools that compensate for the lack of nonverbal cues in text-based digital communication. These elements convey emotional tone, attitude, and vocal nuance that are otherwise difficult to express through written text alone. The same study also reported survey results from 460 respondents, revealing that 30.6% of participants used emojis specifically to influence how they are perceived by others online. This finding indicates that users employ emojis and memes as strategic tools for self-expression and the construction of their online personas.

=== Adolescence study ===
In a longitudinal study in the International Journal of Behavioral Development in 2018, researchers investigated self-other agreement, which refers to the similarity between adolescents' perception of their own personality and their parents' perception. Building on the looking-glass self, researchers examined whether self-other agreement in personality between adolescents and their parents promoted self-esteem development from adolescence to adulthood. The researchers specifically examined whether the effect of self-other agreement prevailed after controlling for personality traits and whether the impact differed between boys and girls. It was hypothesized that when there is high agreement, adolescents may form a clearer and more confident self-view, thereby supporting positive development.

== Applications ==
=== Applications in child development and residential care ===
Studies provide robust empirical support for Cooley's theory, emphasizing the importance of significant others—whether parents or caregivers—as psychological "mirrors" in self-construction. They also illustrate the potential of supportive relational environments in mitigating the negative effects of adversity on identity development.

=== Applications in mental health and recovery ===
The authors emphasized that therapeutic relationships are not only sources of support, but also mirrors that reflect back identity possibilities. They call for practitioners to consciously model recovery-affirming beliefs, using Cooley's theory as a guiding framework for relational empowerment in social work and mental health care.

== Critical perspectives ==
It has been argued that the looking glass self conceptualization of the social self is critically incomplete in that it overlooks the divergent roles of ingroups and outgroups in self-definition. That is, it has been demonstrated that while individuals will converge upon the attitudes and behaviours of ingroup members, they will also diverge from the attitudes and behaviours of outgroup members. The neglect of the latter scenario is attributed to the looking glass approaches' implicit focus on ingroup member appraisals. This alternative perspective is derived from the self-categorization theory analysis of social influence. Indeed, it is further argued that the looking glass self metaphor fails to reflect the fact that influence derives from the self-categorization of other individuals as part of the self. In other words, people are not shaped by the reflections from 'others', but rather are shaped by the creation of a collective social identity that contrasts 'us' against relevant 'others'. Therefore, the concept of self-identity may be considered an example of a social construction.

== Related concepts ==
=== Sociometer hypothesis ===
The sociometer hypothesis was created by Mark R. Leary, Ellen S. Tambor, Sonja K. Terdal, Deborah L. Downs. Ultimately, the hypothesis aims to explain self-esteem as a measure of one's acceptance into society (i.e. their inclusionary status), to indicate whether one is at risk of being socially ostracized. This ability is speculated to have evolved from monitoring the expressions as a method to gauge group membership.

Furthermore, it theorizes parts of the self are constructed based on qualities that are thought to be highly valued by others (i.e. intelligence, athleticism, temperament, etc.). These values are reflected in how an individual weighs different domains of their self regarding desirability (i.e. traits that are perceived to be more socially sought out for hold greater significance). These values are then reflected in the evaluation of one's self-esteem; that is, the higher the self-esteem, the more an individual perceives them as socially accepted and vice versa. Hence why individuals with low self-esteem are thought to be sensitive to indicators of social acceptance, whereas those with high self-esteem are less susceptible.

Decreases in self-esteem are deemed a warning sign that one's interpersonal relationships may be at risk of being jeopardized. On the other hand, occasions that threaten one's ego signal a decline in one's bonds. Ergo, in response to observing a change in their self-esteem, it is predicted that the individual will engage in maintenance behaviours.

Affect is also thought to be closely intertwined with self-esteem. As a byproduct of self-esteem, fluctuations are predicted to produce feelings of social anxiety.

=== Symbolic interaction ===
In hypothesizing the framework, "the mind is mental" because "the human mind is social". From the time they are born, humans define themselves within the context of their social interactions. Children learn that the symbol of their crying will elicit a response from their caregivers, not only when they are in need of necessities such as food or a diaper change, but also when they are in need of attention. Cooley best explains this interaction in On Self and Social Organization, noting that "a growing solidarity between mother and child parallels the child's increasing competence in using significant symbols. This simultaneous development is itself a necessary prerequisite for the child's ability to adopt the perspectives of other participants in social relationships and, thus, for the child's capacity to develop a social self."

George Herbert Mead described the creation of the self as the outcome of "taking the role of the other", the premise for which the self is actualized. Through interaction with others, we begin to develop an identity of our own as well as developing a capacity to empathize with others. As stated by Cooley, "The thing that moves us to pride or shame is not the mere mechanical reflection of ourselves, but an imputed sentiment, the imagined effect of this reflection upon another's mind" (Cooley 1964).

== See also ==
- Expectancy effect
- Michelangelo phenomenon
