= People v. Salem =

1870 Michigan Supreme Court prohibiting public taxation to fund private business

Detroit & Howell R Co v Salem Township Board
- Court: Michigan Supreme Court
- Full case name: The People ex rel the Detroit and Howell R.R. Co. v. the Township Board of Salem
- Decided: May 26, 1870
- Citation: 20 Mich 452 (1870).

Court membership
- Judges sitting: Thomas M. Cooley, James V. Campbell, Isaac P. Christiancy, Benjamin F. Graves

Case opinions
- Opinion by Cooley; Joined by Campbell and Christiancy; Dissent by Graves

Detroit & Howell R Co v Salem Township Board, 20 Mich 452 (1870), is a legal case in which the Michigan Supreme Court held that the Michigan State Constitution of 1850 prohibited the use of public money to finance a privately owned railroad.

== Background ==
=== Mid-century railroading ===
Following a disastrous experiment with state-financed railroad construction in the 1830s and 1840s the people of Michigan had expressly outlawed the direct investment in or construction of "any work of internal improvement" in the state constitution of 1850. Out of that calamity had come two railroads which would dominate the Michigan landscape: the Michigan Central Railroad and the Michigan Southern Railroad (which would become the Lake Shore and Michigan Southern Railway). A second wave of construction came in the 1850s as federally sponsored land grants encouraged the development of new routes such as the north-south Grand Rapids and Indiana Railroad and the Flint and Pere Marquette Railroad, which traversed the lumber-rich region of northern Michigan.

The third wave developed during the 1860s as communities in southern Michigan sought railroad connections. Railroads were believed to spur economic growth and offered better transportation than plank roads; additionally, those communities which already possessed railroads desired additional lines to promote competitive rates between railroad companies. Private finance, however, proved lacking: "there seemed to be little chance that southern Michigan communities hoping for a railroad could get one without some form of public subsidy."

Seeking aid, local communities petitioned the state legislature for permission to loan money to railroads. Initially, this was done on an individual basis. A typical example was the city of Saginaw, which sought and obtained permission by an act of legislature to "issue bonds and loan up to $40,000 to the Amboy, Lansing and Traverse Bay Railroad," subject to approval by local voters. By 1867 there were dozens of such requests pending before the state legislature.

=== Detroit and Howell Railroad ===
The Detroit and Howell Railroad (D&H) was incorporated on June 17, 1864, at a meeting of Howell businessmen in New Hudson. (Note: This is the date given by Meints and Crittenden, who describes the proceedings in detail. A report by the Michigan legislature (1870) puts incorporation at September 21, 1864.) The D&H intended to construct a 48-mile (77 km) line from Detroit to Howell. Part of the proposed route passed through Salem Township, which is located in Washtenaw County, north of Ann Arbor. Under an act passed in 1864, the people of Salem Township voted to provide aid to the D&H in the form of bonds. The township authority, however, refused to issue the bonds, claiming the act was unconstitutional, prompting the railroad to apply for a writ of mandamus.

== Decision ==
Writing for the majority, Justice Thomas M. Cooley struck down the law on the grounds that railroads were a private enterprise and the public funding thereof violated the Michigan constitution. Cooley enunciated three principles which formed the basis of taxation:

1. It must be used for a public purpose.
2. It must be imposed "not arbitrarily or by caprice."
3. If imposed specifically on a locality (as opposed to a statewide tax), the tax must be of benefit for the locality itself.

Cooley rejected the notion that railroads were a "public highway," writing:

They are not, when in private hands, the people's highways; but they are private property, whose owners make it their business to transport persons and merchandize in their own carriages, over their own land, for such pecuniary compensation as may be stipulated. These owners carry on, for their own benefit, a business which has, indeed, its public aspect, inasmuch as it accommodates a public want, and its establishment is consequently, in a certain sense, a public purpose. But it is not such a purpose in any other or different sense than would be the opening of a hotel, the establishment of a line of stages, or the putting in operation of a grist mill ...

Reflecting on the state constitution's bar on the funding of internal improvements, Cooley stated that

what the state as a political community cannot do it cannot require the inferior municipalities to do. When the case is found to stand entirely outside the domain of taxation, state burdens and township burdens are alike precluded' no township vote and no township majority however large, can affect the principle.

== Impact ==
The immediate impact of the decision was to throw the development of railroads in the state of Michigan into chaos and to call into question the validity of all municipal bonds already issued. The latter question would eventually be taken up by the Supreme Court of the United States, which held in Taylor v. Ypsilanti (1881) that bonds issued prior to the Michigan court's ruling were valid and had to be honored:

... we are of opinion that the rights of the plaintiff, as the owner of bonds issued under a statute which, when passed, was valid by the laws of Michigan, as declared and acted upon by the several departments of its government, are not affected by decisions of the Supreme Court of the State rendered after the railroad company, to whose rights the plaintiff succeeded, has earned the bonds under contract with the city made in conformity with the statute.

Far from terminating local funding of railroads, the ruling forced municipalities and railroad companies to change their approach. In lieu of direct aid, railroads sought stock subscriptions from private citizens directly. So-called "promoters" roamed the state, drumming up support for various railroad schemes, many of which never came to fruition.

In the same year as People v. Salem, the D&H merged with the Howell and Lansing to form the Detroit, Howell and Lansing under James F. Joy. After this the D&H ceased to exist as an independent company.
