= Lowell Juilliard Carr =

Lowell Juilliard Carr (1885 – 1963) was an American sociologist, author, and long-time university professor. He is the author of the 1952 book Willow Run, which discusses the sociological conditions arising from the wartime increase in the worker population at the Willow Run bomber plant in Michigan during World War II. He was also a pioneer in the study of the underlying social causes for juvenile delinquency.

== Early life and education ==
Carr was born in Canton, Ohio in 1885. He was an editor at the Detroit Free Press before receiving his bachelor's degree from the University of Michigan.

== Career ==
Carr began teaching undergraduate courses at the University of Michigan in 1907. He was a sociology professor at the school for the next thirty years. In 1923, he wrote a musical comedy entitled "The Iron Age", which was performed on campus. He received his Ph.D in 1924, from the University of Michigan. Carr then traveled to Europe and studied for a year at the University of London before returning to Ann Arbor.

During his tenure as a professor, he co-wrote one of the leading early reference works discussing modern sociology with Charles Cooley and Robert Cooley Angell, a book that is still often quoted. He emphasized the educational process as a means for social improvement through the progressive building of a better society.

In recognition of his pioneering work on understanding and preventing delinquency in minors, Carr was named director of the Michigan Child Guidance Institute and was its spokesperson for several years in the 1940s. He also frequently wrote articles for the Michigan Juvenile Delinquency Information Service and edited and published the Delinquency News Letter for the Michigan State Welfare Dept, Bureau of Probation.

In the 1950s, Carr was appointed a professor of sociology at the University of Miami in Coral Gables, Florida.

== Carr's Works ==
- 1933: Introductory Sociology, with Charles Cooley and Robert C. Angell. New York: Charles Scribner's Sons
- 1936: Organizing to Reduce Delinquency: The Michigan Plan for Better Citizenship (ASIN B00086R4XC)
- 1936: What's Wrong with Juvenile Probation and Parole in Michigan: Report of a Survey of 230 Probationers and 120 Parolees in Six Counties (ASIN B0008AH8IE)
- 1939: Integrating the Camp, the Community and Social Work. New York: Association Press (ASIN B0006AOOIS)
- 1941: Delinquency Control. New York: Harper & Brothers (ASIN: B0007DFEFG)
- 1948: Analytical Sociology. New York: Harper & Brothers
- 1948: Situational Analysis: an Observational Approach to Introductory Sociology. New York: Harper & Brothers (ASIN B000L95LUY)
- 1952: Willow Run (Work, Its Rewards and Discontents): a Study of industrialization and Cultural Inadequacy, with James Edson Stermer. New York: Harper & Brothers (ISBN 978-0405101588)
