= Dating coach =

Person who offers training for dating and relationships

Dating coaches offer coaching and related products and services to improve their clients' success in dating and relationships. Through discussion, role-playing, behaviour modelling, and other forms of direction, a dating coach trains clients to meet and attract romantic partners. Dating coaches may focus on topics important to the art of dating: interpersonal skills, flirting, psychology, sociology, compatibility, fashion and recreational activities. As dating coaches are unlicensed, their methods vary widely.

== Technique ==
Dating coaches offer a wide range of services, such as electronic books and newsletters, personal coaching, small group seminars, and weekend workshops. One-on-one coaching can involve counselling and in-the-field coaching, which can involve practising flirting or going out with a coach of the sex the client is attracted to on a mock date and being critiqued throughout the date. They are distinct from matchmakers because they coach people on finding their own dates whereas matchmakers arrange dates for their clients. Coaching styles and programmes differ from provider to provider, and may include advice on the art of conversation, pickup lines, how to dress, appropriate forms of touch, the science of love, and anything else that may improve dating prospects. Others provide guidance on how to date multiple people simultaneously, without getting caught. Common elements of dating coaches' tips include the need to decide what you are looking for and remain positive.

Some dating coaches specialize in helping with online dating. Many coaches promote and monetize their activity on social networks, and offer to manage their clients' social profiles. Dating coaches may also be relationship coaches, helping their clients escalate a relationship up to an official marriage.

== Dating seminars ==
Dating seminars are taught by coaches working for commercial dating companies. In these seminars, coaches teach participants to meet romantic partners. Sometimes dating coaches take the clients out in public to help the clients approach and seduce women. This method of teaching is heavily linked to the seduction community and the companies which cater to it. Most times, dating coaches introduce dating techniques like approaching in the crowd, non-verbal body signal interpretation, and transparency in interpersonal communicative acts.

Different dating seminars can take vastly different approaches to the subject. Christian dating seminars, for example, may stress differences between love and lust and knowing one's own self-worth. Muslim dating seminars may also deal with how to find a mate without compromising religious principles.

== Stigma ==
Some feel that dating presents challenges unsuited to amateur intervention, and that chaotic dating norms and mixed social messages necessitate some form of instruction. Further, they feel that personal romantic barriers differ from other sorts of personal barriers so that coaching can be uniquely fruitful. Moreover, some argue that changing social norms have been particularly challenging for men. Because a number of economic and social obstacles to relationship dissolution have been eroded, sex appeal and relationship smarts may be necessary to compensate for devalued traditional traits, such as a strong work ethic or good and stable income.

There is evidence that the stigma against dating coaches is weakening.

== In the popular culture ==
- Chhoti Si Baat, a 1975 Hindi film about a dating coach
- Hitch, a 2005 Hollywood film about a dating coach
- Partner, a 2007 Hindi film about a dating coach influenced from Hitch (2005)

== See also ==
- Seduction community
- Group dating
- Life coaching
