= Charles Horton Cooley =

American sociologist (1864–1929)

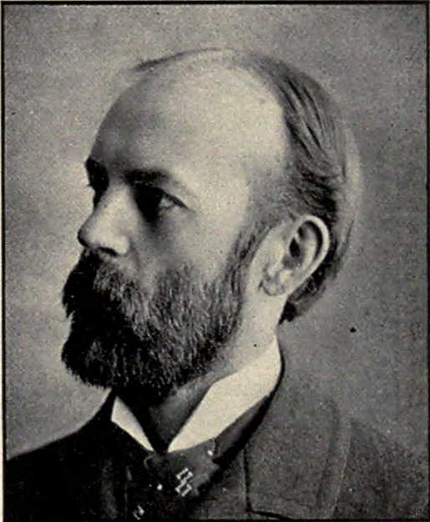
- Cooley from 1902 Michiganensian
- Born: August 17, 1864; Ann Arbor, Michigan, U.S.
- Died: May 7, 1929 (aged 65); Ann Arbor, Michigan, U.S.
- Spouse: Elsie Cooley (m. 1890)
- Parents: Mary Horton; Thomas M. Cooley

Academic background
- Education: University of Michigan
- Thesis: The Theory of Transportation (1894)
- Influences: James Mark Baldwin; Charles Darwin; John Dewey; Ralph Waldo Emerson; William James; George Herbert Mead; Charles A. Ellwood

Academic work
- Discipline: Sociology
- School or tradition: Pragmatism; symbolic interactionism
- Institutions: University of Michigan
- Notable works: Human Nature and the Social Order (1902); Social Organization (1909)
- Notable ideas: Looking-glass self
- Influenced: Harry Stack Sullivan

Charles Horton Cooley (August 17, 1864 – May 7, 1929) was an American sociologist. He was the son of Michigan Supreme Court Judge Thomas M. Cooley. He studied and went on to teach economics and sociology at the University of Michigan.

He was a founding member of the American Sociological Association in 1905 and became its eighth president in 1918. He is perhaps best known for his concept of the looking-glass self, which is the concept that a person's self grows out of society's interpersonal interactions and the perceptions of others.

== Biography ==
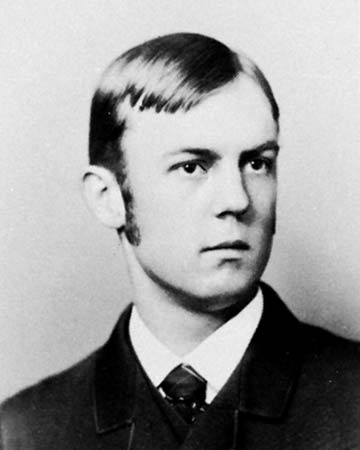
Cooley as a young man

Charles Horton Cooley was born in Ann Arbor, Michigan, on August 17, 1864, to Mary Elizabeth Horton and Thomas M. Cooley. Thomas Cooley was the Supreme Court Judge for the state of Michigan, and he was one of the first three faculty members to found the University of Michigan Law School in 1859. He served as dean of the law school from 1859 to 1884. Cooley's mother, Mary, took an active interest in public affairs and traveled with her husband to several cities around the United States in relation to the Interstate Commerce Commission. His father was a very successful political figure who stressed the importance of education to his six children. Nevertheless, Cooley had a difficult childhood, which exacerbated his feelings of detachment towards his father. Cooley was a daydreamer and much of his "dreaming-life" had a substantial influence to his sociological works. As a child, he dealt with feelings of isolation and loneliness, which led him to develop an interest in reading and writing.

=== Education ===
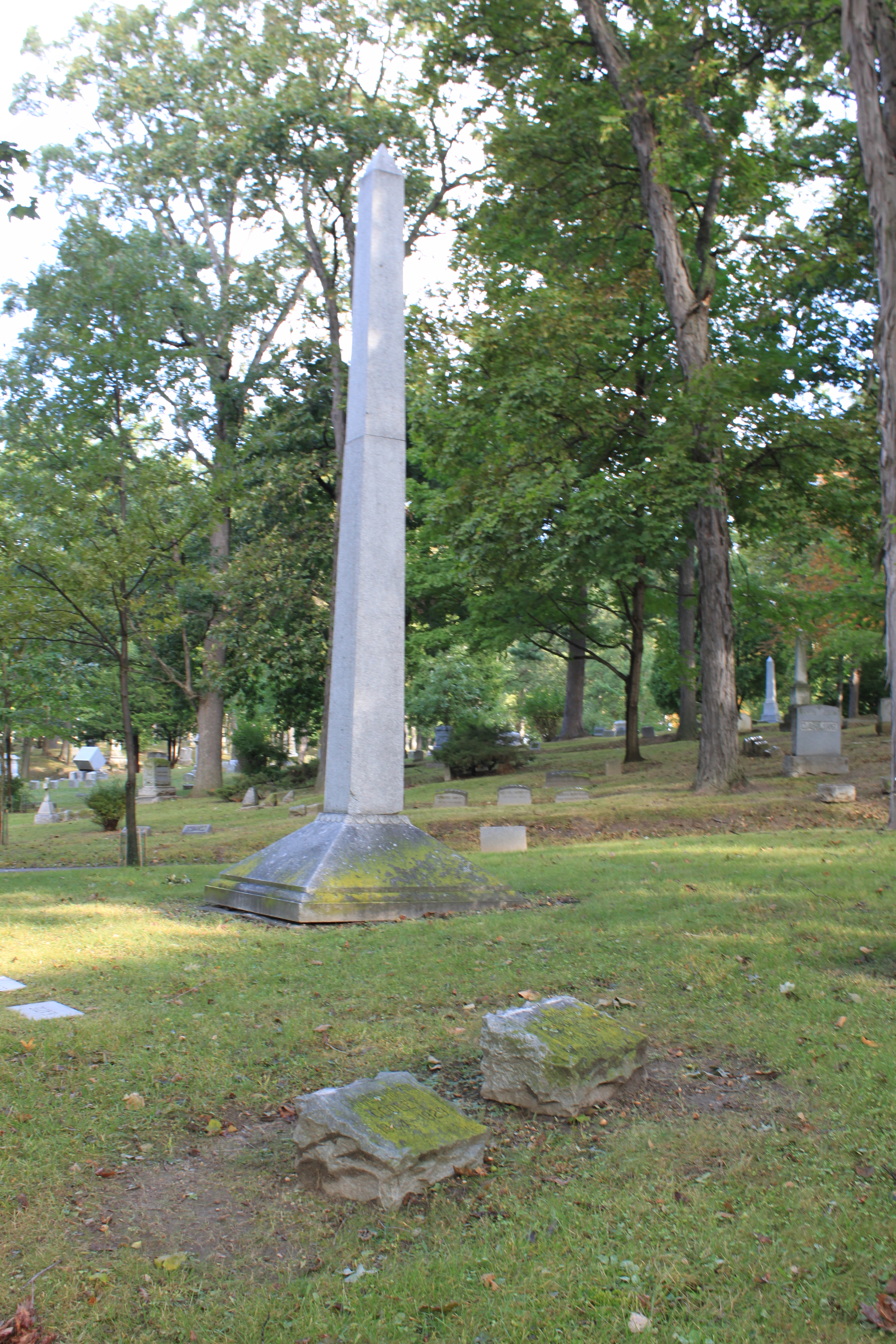
Cooley grave in front of Cooley family obelisk, Forest Hill Cemetery, Ann Arbor

At the age of sixteen, Cooley began attending the University of Michigan. Cooley graduated from the University of Michigan in 1887, and continued with a year's training in mechanical engineering. Cooley returned to pursue a master's degree in political science and sociology in 1890. Following completion, he began teaching economics and sociology at UMich in the fall of 1892. Cooley went on to receive a PhD in philosophy in 1894. At this time he was interested in the subject matter of sociology, but due to the University of Michigan not having a sociology department, he had to continue the examination of his PhD through Columbia University. There, Cooley worked closely alongside American sociologist and economist, Franklin Henry Giddings and developed his doctoral thesis, The Theory of Transportation in economics.

Since his father was honored nationwide, Cooley feared the idea of failure. He lacked direction in life and contemplated science, mathematics, social science, psychology or sociology as his field of study. He wished to write and think, and after reading philosopher Herbert Spencer's works, Cooley realized he had an interest in social problems. He shared his reflections of the works of Spencer in 1920, citing that while he brought many valuable viewpoints with the subject of Darwinian principles, he lacks sympathy and the appropriate usage of the sociological perspective.

Cooley decided that he wanted to study sociology because it gave him the ability to analyze social discrepancies. He taught the University of Michigan's very first sociology class in 1899. He also played a prominent role in the development of symbolic interactionism, in which he worked heavily with fellow University of Michigan faculty member, psychologist John Dewey.

== Theory ==
=== Cooley's methodology ===
Cooley is noted for his displeasure at the divisions within the sociological community over methodology. He preferred an empirical, observational approach. While he appreciated the use of statistics after working as a statistician in the Interstate Commerce Commission and Census Bureau, he preferred case studies: often using his own children as the subjects on his observation. He also encouraged sociologists to use the method of sympathetic introspection when attempting to understand the consciousness of an individual. Cooley thought that the only practical method is to study the actual situation "closely" and "kindly" with other people involved, then gradually work out the evil from the mixture and replace it with good. Basically, the only way to understand a grotesque human being is to identify how and why his human nature has come to work that way. He felt it was necessary in order to truly understand the activities taken from the actor, effectively separating Cooley from a majority of sociologists who preferred more traditional, scientific techniques.

=== Theory on transportation and the shift to sociology ===
Cooley's first major work, The Theory of Transportation (1894), was his doctoral dissertation on economic theory. In his thesis, he discussed industrial growth and expansion during the nineteenth century. This piece was notable for its conclusion that towns and cities tend to be located at the confluence of transportation routes—the so-called "break" in transportation. His debt to German sociologists, particularly Albert Schäffle, has remained largely underresearched. Cooley soon shifted to a broader analysis of the interplay of individual and social processes. In Human Nature and the Social Order (1902) he foreshadowed George Herbert Mead's discussion of the symbolic ground of the self by detailing the way in which an individual's active participation in society affects the emergence of normal social participation. Cooley greatly extended this conception of the "looking-glass self" (I am, who I think you think, that I am) in his next book, Social Organization (1909), in which he sketched a comprehensive approach to society and its major processes.

=== Social organization ===
The first sixty pages of Social Organization (1909) were a sociological antidote to Sigmund Freud. In that much-quoted segment, Cooley formulated the crucial role of primary groups (family, playgroups and community of elders) as the source of one's morals, sentiments, and ideals. Primary groups are the first groups of individuals one is introduced to and are also influenced in their ideas and beliefs. They are the result of intimate association and corporation, along with coinciding ideals and values. He argued that individuals have two different channels of life- one from heredity and the other from society. Heredity is biological and predisposed; it is the human nature that people are born with. Society is the human nature that is expressed in primary groups that we can find in all civilizations. But the impact of a primary group is so great that individuals cling to shared beliefs in more complex associations, and even create new primary groupings within formal organizations.

In the Social Organization, Cooley asks what makes up a society. He focuses on the relationship between the individual and the larger unity of the society. He viewed society and the individual as one since they cannot exist without one another: where society has a strong impact on individual behavior and vice versa. He also concluded that the more industrialized a society becomes, the more individualistic its inhabitants are. Cooley viewed society as a constant experiment in enlarging social experience and in coordinating variety. He, therefore, analyzed the operation of such complex social forms as formal institutions and social class systems and the subtle controls of public opinion. Class differences reflect different contributions to society, as well as the phenomena of aggrandizement (the increase of power or reputation of individuals and values) and exploitation.

=== Cooley and social subjectivity ===
Cooley's theories regarding social subjectivity were described in a threefold necessity that had developed within the realm of society. The first of which was the necessity to create an understanding of social phenomena that highlighted the subjective mental processes of individuals. Yet, Cooley realized that these subjective processes were both the causes and effects of society's processes. The second necessity examined the development of a social dynamic conception that portrayed states of chaos as natural occurrences which could provide opportunities for "adaptive innovation." Finally, a need to manifest publics that were capable of exerting some form of "informed moral control" over current problems and future directions.

In regards to these aforementioned dilemmas, Cooley responded by stating that society and individual denote not separable phenomena but different aspects of the same thing: "A separate individual is an abstraction unknown to experience, and so likewise is society when regarded as something apart from individuals." From this, he resolved to create a "Mental-Social" Complex of which he would term the "looking-glass self."

The looking-glass self is created through the imagination of how one's self might be viewed through the eyes of another individual. This would later be termed "empathic introspection." This theory not only applied to the individual, but to the macro-level economic issues of society and macro-sociological conditions that develop over time.

To the economy, Cooley presented a divergent view from the norm, stating that "...even economic institutions could [not] be understood solely as a result of impersonal market forces." With regard to the sociological perspective and its relevancy toward traditions he states that the dissolution of traditions may be positive, thus creating "the sort of virtues, as well as of vices, that we find on the frontier: plain dealing, love of character and force, kindness, hope, hospitality and courage." He believed that sociology continues to contribute to the "growing efficiency of the intellectual processes that would enlighten the larger public will."

=== The "looking-glass self" ===
The "looking-glass self" is undoubtedly Cooley's most famous concept, and is widely known and accepted by psychologists and sociologists today. It expanded William James's idea of self to include the capacity of reflection on its own behavior. Other people's views build, change and maintain our self-image; thus, there is an interaction between how we see ourselves and how others see us. Through these interactions, human beings develop an idea of who they are. He argued that when we feel shame or pride, it is due to what we think others view us as. He also mentions that we do not always perceive someone's impressions correctly. For example, if a student incorrectly answers a question in class, they might later question their own intelligence or capacity to prepare sufficiently. The notion of the looking-glass self applies throughout an individual's life: interactions with new people time and again encourage self-evaluation based on a presumed impression given off. In other words, one's self-identity can be socially constructed.

In his 1902 work, Human Nature and the Social Order, Cooley defined this concept as:

"... a somewhat definite imagination of how one's self—that is, any idea he appropriates—appears in a particular mind, and the kind of self-feeling one has is determined by the attitude toward this attributed to that other mind... So in imagination, we perceive in another's mind some thought of our appearance, manners, aims, deeds, character, friends, and so on, and are variously affected by it."

Thus, the three stages observed in the looking-glass self are outlines as:

- You imagine how you appear to the other person.
- You imagine the judgment of the other person.
- You feel some sense of pride, happiness, guilt, or shame.

In line with William James's thoughts, the concept of the looking glass self-contributed to an increasing abandonment of the so-called Cartesian disjunction between the human mind and the external social world. Cooley sought to break down the barrier Cartesian thought had erected between the individual and its social context.

"A self-idea of this sort seems to have three principal elements: the imagination of our appearance to the other person; the imagination of his judgment of that appearance, and some sort of self-feeling, such as pride or mortification."

=== Social process ===
Cooley's Social Process (1918) emphasized the non-rational, tentative nature of social organization and the significance of social competition. Social Process was an essay-based work that expressed Cooley's social theories. It was more philosophical than sociological. He interpreted modern difficulties as the clash of primary group values (love, ambition, loyalty) and institutional values (impersonal ideologies such as progress or Protestantism) (See also The Protestant Ethic and the Spirit of Capitalism). As societies try to cope with their difficulties, they adjust these two kinds of values to one another as best they can. Cooley also mentions the idea of heroes and hero worship. He believed that heroes were an aide or a servant to the internalization of social norms because they represent and serve as an example to reinforce social values. The Social Process was Cooley's last major work, heavily influenced by Darwinian principles of natural selection and adaptation to collective (social) existence.

== Personal life ==
Cooley married Elsie Jones in 1890, who was the daughter of a professor of medicine at the University of Michigan. Mrs. Cooley differed from her husband in that she was outgoing, energetic, and capable of ordering their common lives in such a manner that mundane cares were not to weigh heavily on her husband. The couple had three children, a boy and two girls, and lived quietly and fairly withdrawn in a house close to the campus. The children served Cooley as his own domestic laboratory subjects for his study of genesis and growth of the self. He would observe imitation behavior in his three children and analyzed their reactions based on age. Even when he was not engaged in the observation of his own self and wished to observe others, he did not need to leave the domestic circle. Cooley also found pleasure in amateur botany and bird-watching in spare time away from his research.

Cooley's health began to deteriorate in 1928. He was diagnosed with an unidentified form of cancer in March 1929 and died two months later.

== Cooley's works ==
- 1891: The Social Significance of Street Railways, Publications of the American Economic Association 6, 71–73
- 1894: Competition and Organization, Publications of the Michigan Political Science Association 1, 33–45
- 1894: The Theory of Transportation, Baltimore: Publications of the American Economic Association 9
- 1896: Nature versus Nurture' in the Making of Social Careers, Proceedings of the 23rd Conference of Charities and Corrections: 399–405
- 1897: Genius, Fame and the Comparison of Races, Philadelphia: Annals of the American Academy of Political and Social Science 9, 1–42
- 1897: The Process of Social Change, Political Science Quarterly 12, 63–81
- 1899: Personal Competition: Its Place in the Social Order and the Effect upon Individuals; with Some Considerations on Success, Economic Studies 4,
- 1902: Human Nature and the Social Order, New York: Charles Scribner's Sons (online), revised edn 1922

(online)

- 1902: The Decrease of Rural Population in the Southern Peninsula of Michigan, Publications of the Michigan Political Science Association 4, 28–37
- 1904: Discussion of Franklin H. Giddings', A Theory of Social Causation, Publications of the American Economic Association, Third Series, 5, 426–431
- 1907: Social Consciousness, Publications of the American Sociological Society 1, 97–109
- 1907: Social Consciousness, American Journal of Sociology 12, 675–687 Previously published as above.
- 1908: A Study of the Early Use of Self-Words by a Child, Psychological Review 15, 339–357
- 1909: Social Organization: a Study of the Larger Mind, New York: Charles Scribner's Sons (online)
- 1909: Builder of Democracy, Survey, 210–213
- 1912: Discussion of Simon Patten's The Background of Economic Theories, Publications of the American Sociological Society 7, 132
- 1912: Valuation as a Social Process, Psychological Bulletin 9, Also published as part of Social Process
- 1913: The Institutional Character of Pecuniary Valuation, American Journal of Sociology 18, 543–555. Also published as part of Social Process
- 1913: The Sphere of Pecuniary Valuation, American Journal of Sociology 19, 188–203. Also published as part of Social Process
- 1915: The Progress of Pecuniary Valuation, The Quarterly Journal of Economics 30, 1–21. Also published as part of Social Process
- 1916: Builder of Democracy, Survey 36, 116
- 1917: Social Control in International Relations, Publications of the American Sociological Society 12, 207–216
- 1918: Social Process, New York: Charles Scribner's Sons (online)
- 1918: A Primary Culture for Democracy, Publications of the American Sociological Society 13, 1–10
- 1918: Political Economy and Social Process, Journal of Political Economy 25, 366–374
- 1921: Reflections Upon the Sociology of Herbert Spencer, American Journal of Sociology 26, 129–145
- 1924: Now and Then, Journal of Applied Sociology 8, 259–262.
- 1926: The Roots of Social Knowledge, American Journal of Sociology 32, 59–79.
- 1926: Heredity or Environment, Journal of Applied Sociology 10, 303–307
- 1927: Life and the Student, NY: Charles Scribner's Sons
- 1928: Case Study of Small Institutions as a Method of Research, Publications of the American Sociological Society 22, 123–132
- 1928: Sumner and Methodology, Sociology and Social Research 12, 303–306
- 1929: The Life-Study Method as Applied to Rural Social Research, Publications of the American Sociological Society 23, 248–254
- 1930: The Development of Sociology at Michigan. pp. 3–14 in Sociological Theory and Research, being Selected papers of Charles Horton Cooley, edited by Robert Cooley Angell, New York: Henry Holt
- 1930: Sociological Theory and Social Research, New York: Henry Holt
- 1933: Introductory Sociology, with Robert C Angell and Lowell J Carr, NY: Charles Scribner's Sons

== See also ==
- Cartesian doubt
