= Alcohol and Native Americans =

Use of alcoholic beverages by Native Americans

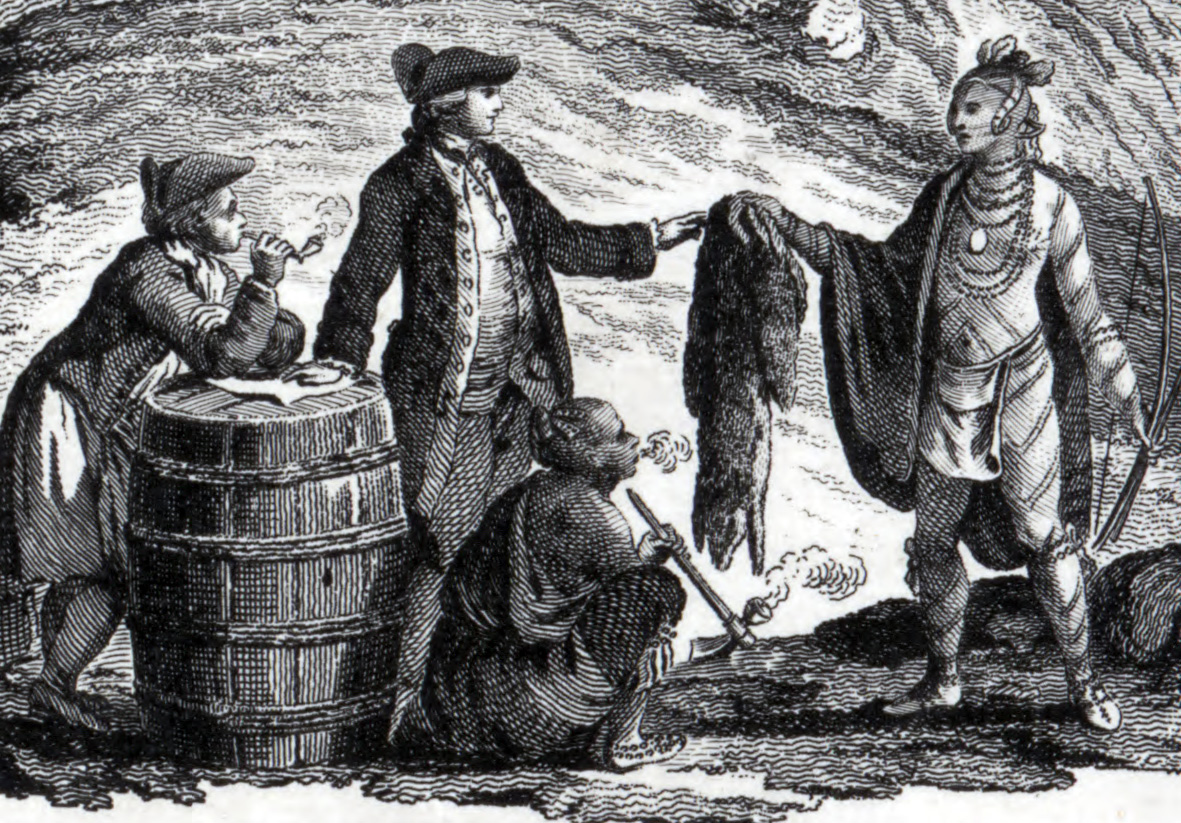
European fur traders doing business with Native Americans in 1777, with a barrel of rum to the left

Many Native Americans in the United States have been harmed by, or become addicted to, drinking alcohol. Among contemporary Native Americans and Alaska Natives, 11.7% of all deaths are related to alcohol. By comparison, about 5.9% of global deaths are attributable to alcohol consumption. Because of negative stereotypes and biases based on race and social class, generalizations and popular misconceptions abound around the topic of Native American alcohol misuse.

A survey of death certificates from 2006 to 2010 showed that deaths among Native Americans due to alcohol are about four times as common as in the general U.S. population. They are often due to traffic collisions and liver disease, with homicide, suicide, and falls also contributing. Deaths related to alcohol among Native Americans are more common in men and among northern Plains Indians. Alaska Natives showed the lowest incidence of alcohol-related death. Alcohol misuse amongst Native Americans has been shown to be associated with development of disease, including hearing and vision problems, kidney and bladder problems, head injuries, pneumonia, tuberculosis, dental problems, liver problems, and pancreatitis. In some tribes, the rate of fetal alcohol spectrum disorder is as high as 1.5 to 2.5 per 1,000 live births, more than seven times the national average. Among Alaska Natives, the rate of fetal alcohol spectrum disorder is 5.6 per 1,000 live births.

Native American and Native Alaskan youth are far more likely to experiment with alcohol at a younger age than non-Native youth. Low self-esteem and transgenerational trauma have been associated with substance use disorders among Native American teens in the U.S. and Canada. Alcohol education and prevention programs have focused on raising self-esteem, emphasizing traditional values, and recruiting Native youth to advocate for abstinence and healthy substitution.

Historically, those Native American tribes who manufactured alcoholic drinks used them and other mind-altering substances in ritual settings and rarely for personal enjoyment. Liquor was unknown until introduced by Europeans, therefore alcohol dependence was largely unknown when European contact was made. The use of alcohol as a trade item and the practice of intoxication for fun, or to alleviate stress, gradually undermined traditional Native American culture until by the late 18th century, alcoholism was recognized as a serious problem in many Native American communities. Native American leaders campaigned with limited success to educate Native Americans about the dangers of drinking and intoxication. Legislation prohibiting the sale of alcohol to Native Americans generally failed to prevent alcohol-related social and health problems, and discriminatory legislation was abandoned in the 1950s in favor of laws passed in Native American communities by Native Americans. Modern treatment focuses on culturally appropriate strategies that emphasize traditional activities designed to promote spiritual harmony and group solidarity.

== History ==
Pre-Columbian Native Americans fermented starchy seeds and roots as well as fruits from both wild and domesticated plants. Among the most common are drinks made from fermented corn, agave, and manioc. Aboriginal use of alcohol generally took place in shared spiritual experiences that often arose out of the shamanistic tradition and was invested with expectations of improved well-being, as opposed to individual enjoyment or entertainment.

Before contact, Native Americans used mind-altering substances to communicate with the spirit world, and intoxication was "associated with a quest for enlightenment, powers of healing, and the facilitation of war-making. [They related] the new phenomenon of intoxication ... to the old concepts of dreaming, communion with the spirit world, and the acquisition of power." Aberrant behavior while intoxicated was frequently forgiven (for example, among the Catawba and the Lakota Sioux) as though the drinker had been possessed by powers beyond their control.

=== Influence of Mesoamerica ===
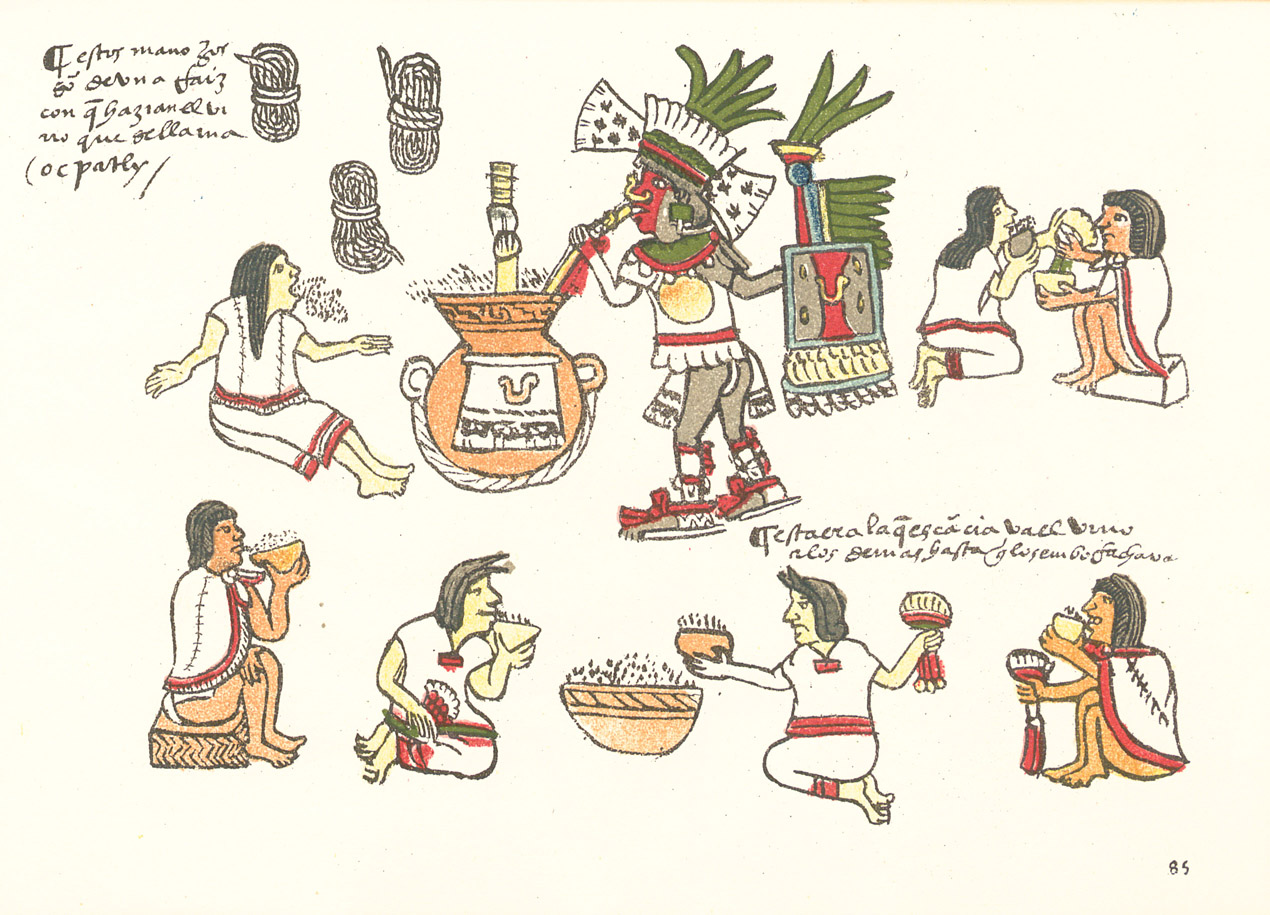
Aztecs depicted in the Codex Magliabechiano (folio 85r) drinking pulque on the feast of Quecholli. In the center, the god Mixcoatl drinks from a jug using a straw. To the left, a woman vomits.

Pre-Columbian Mesoamericans in Mexico and Central America prepared over forty different alcoholic beverages from a variety of plants and plant extracts. Traditional Mayan beverages have included:

- Balché, made from the bark of Lonchocarpus violaceus soaked in honey and water and fermented.
- Xtabentún, made from honey produced from the nectar of a species of morning glory (Turbina corymbosa).
- Coyol wine or chicha de coyol, made from the sap of coyol palms.
- Colonche, made with the fruits of Opuntia streptacantha (prickly pear).
- Tepache, made from the peel and rind of pineapples.
- Tesgüino and sotol made by the Huichol Indians from Dasylirion wheeleri (commonly known as Desert Spoon or sotol), guavas, and corn stalks.

Traditional drinks made from fermented corn or corn flour include tejuino, pozol, chicha or chicha de jora, and pox.

==== Fermented cacao beverage ====
Evidence from Puerto Escondido dating to the formative stage of the Olmec Culture (1100-900 BC) indicates that a weak alcoholic cacao beverage was made from fermented cacao pulp and stored in pottery containers. Fermentation is an early step in the process also used to produce the nonalcoholic chocolate beverage widely consumed in Mesoamerica.

==== Pulque or octli ====
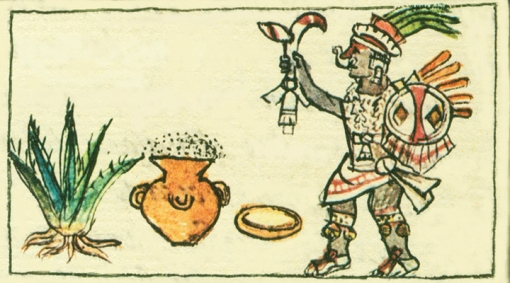
The making of pulque, as illustrated in the Florentine Codex (Book 1 Appendix, fo.40)

For at least 1,800 years the indigenous peoples of the Central Highlands of Mexico have brewed pulque (Nahuatl: ometochtli or octli) from the fermented sap of the maguey (agave) plant. Gas chromatographic analysis of ceramic vessels in Teotihuacan, dated to AD 200–550, found evidence that they once contained pulque. For the Aztecs, the imbibing of pulque was done only by certain people, under certain conditions. It was a ritual drink, consumed during festivals such as that of the goddess Mayahuel, and the god Mixcoatl. Bernardino de Sahagún records the Aztec ceremony associated with drinking:

Libation was done in this manner: when octli was drunk, when they tasted the new octli, when someone had just made octli ... he summoned people. He set it out in a vessel before the hearth, along with small cups for drinking. Before having anyone drink, he took up octli with a cup and then poured it before the hearth; he poured the octli in the four directions. And when he had poured the octli then everyone drank it.

Pulque was drunk by Aztec priests and their sacrificial victims, to increase the priests' enthusiasm and to ease the suffering of the victim. Among commoners, it was permitted only to the elderly and pregnant or lactating women due to the association between pulque and fertility, purification and renewal. Production of pulque was ritualized and the brewers would abstain from sex during the fermentation period. During most festivals, participants were not permitted to drink more than four cups of pulque, and Aztec folklore describes the likely fate of people who drank too much, including death by disease or accident. Exaggerated tales of the Huastec people characterized them as habitual drunkards and detailed their shameful behavior under the influence of alcohol, in an effort to discourage drunkenness among the Aztecs. Elderly Aztecs who had reached the age of 70 and had raised families could drink as much as they wanted, as long as their children carried them home safely, keeping them covered up and "restraining and guiding" them so they would avoid "committing excesses and transgressions," and not fall "into a river or a hole." Drunkenness was also viewed as a means of establishing communication between humans and the gods, and was therefore not considered appropriate for commoners. Alcoholic intoxication was seen as an act of transcending the boundaries of human, divine and natural forces, one that should only be done by accomplished, brave and important members of society so as to avoid offending the supernatural world. Among the Maya, pulque was referred to as chih and was flavored with honey and spices.

=== Pre-colonial North America ===
Prior to contact with colonists, alcohol use and production were mainly concentrated in the territory that today comprises the southwestern United States. In 2007, archaeologist Glenna Dean conducted studies to show that, between AD 828 and 1126, Pueblos in Chaco Canyon were brewing a weak beer made by fermenting kernels of corn. Gas chromatography analysis of 800-year-old potsherds found at Pueblo Bonito in 2006 contained residues consistent with fermented corn products.

Some Native American tribes produced weak beers, wine, and other fermented beverages, but the alcohol was naturally limited to 8–14% ABV, and they were used only for ceremonial purposes. The still, required to make stronger alcoholic beverages, was unknown. The Tohono O'odham, Piman, Apache, and Maricopa people all used the saguaro cactus to produce a wine, sometimes called tiswin or haren a pitahaya. The Chiricahua prepared a kind of corn beer called tula-pah using sprouted corn kernels, dried and ground, flavored with locoweed or lignum vitae roots, placed in water and allowed to ferment. The Coahuiltecan in Texas combined mountain laurel with agave sap to create an alcoholic drink similar to pulque, and the Zunis are believed to have made fermented beverages from aloe, maguey, corn, prickly pear, pitaya, and even grapes.

In eastern North America the Creek of Georgia and Cherokee of the Carolinas used berries and other fruits to make alcoholic beverages, and there is some evidence that the Huron made a mild beer by soaking corn in water to produce a fermented gruel to be consumed at tribal feasts. In the northwest, the Kwakiutl of Vancouver Island produced a mildly alcoholic drink using elderberry juice, black chitons, and tobacco. Despite the fact that they had little to no agriculture, both the Aleuts and Yuit of Kodiak Island in Alaska were observed making alcoholic drinks from fermented raspberries.

=== European colonization ===
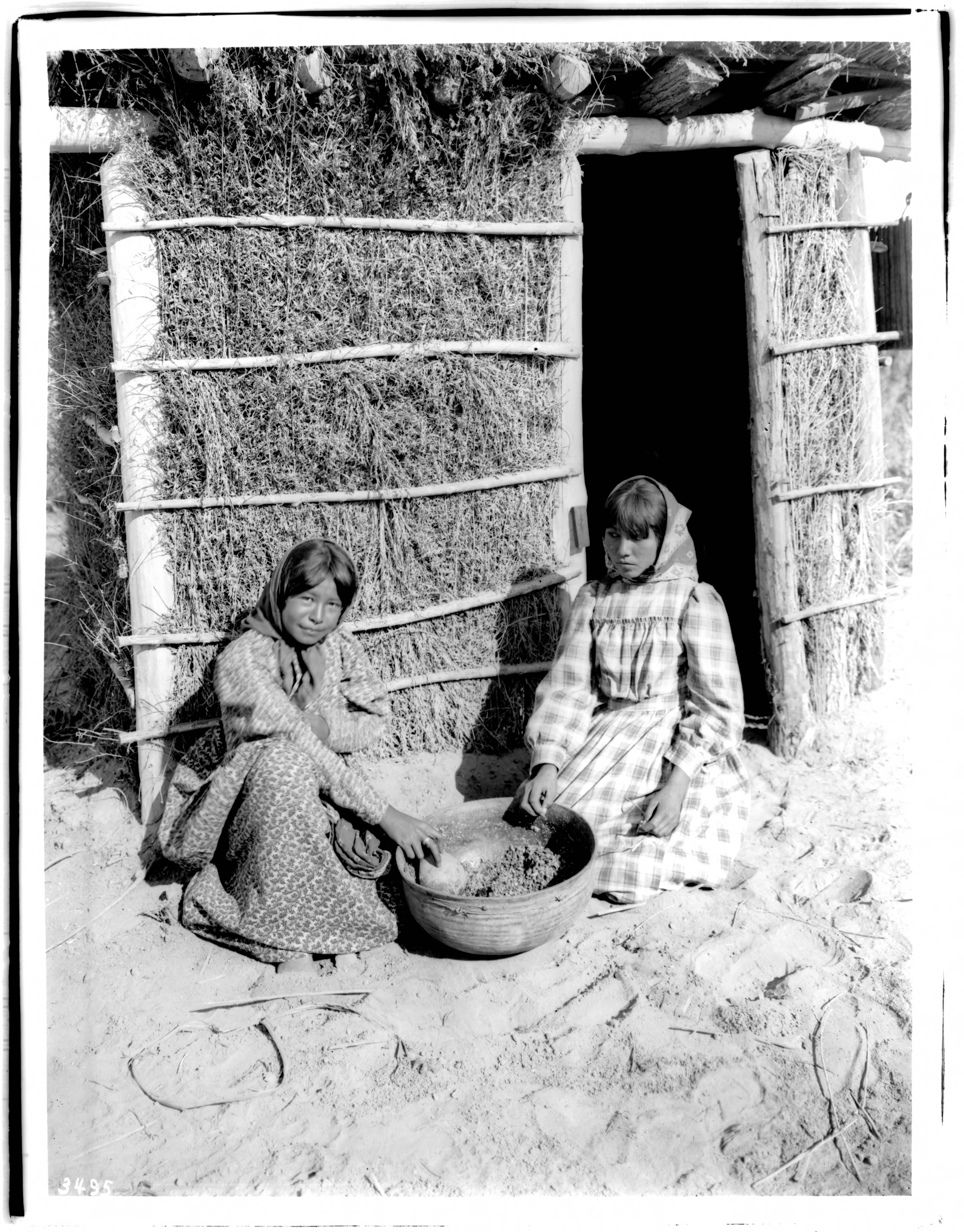
Two young Chemehuevi Native girls making an alcoholic drink from mesquite beans, taken by Charles C. Pierce, ca. 1900

A number of early accounts report that many Native Americans had no tradition of making alcoholic beverages, and did not know the effects of alcohol. Rather than approval, most Native peoples initially responded to alcohol with distaste and suspicion. They considered drunkenness "degrading to free men" and questioned the motives of those who would offer a substance that was so offensive to the senses and that made men foolish. Most Native people who did drink alcohol were reported to show "remarkable restraint while in their cups." Most drank alcohol only during social or trading contact with whites.

When Europeans began making a large quantity of distilled spirits and wine available to Native Americans, the tribes had very little time to adapt and develop social, legal, or moral guidelines to regulate alcohol use. Early traders exchanged alcohol for highly sought-after animal skins and other materials and resources. Traders discovered that giving free alcohol to Native Americans during trading sessions provided a distinct advantage during negotiations. Extreme intoxication was common among the colonists, contrary to the inexperienced native populations.

By the early 1700s the effects of alcohol use disorder were damaging Native American communities. Rum as well as brandy and other distilled beverages had become important trade items and essential elements in diplomatic councils, treaty negotiations, and political transactions, and had become part of Native American gift-giving rituals. The result was the erosion of civility, an increase in violence, and widespread health problems. Alcohol made men less reliable hunters and allies, destabilized village economics, and contributed to a rise in poverty. The minutes of the Provincial Council of Pennsylvania for 16 May 1704 record a complaint submitted by Chief Ortiagh of the Conestoga Indians:

Great quantities of rum [are] continually brought to their town, insomuch as they [are] ruined by it, having nothing left but have laid out all, even their clothes, for rum, and may now, when threatened with war, be surprised by their enemies when beside themselves with drink, and so be utterly destroyed.

John Lawson described the effects of alcohol on the tribes of North Carolina, which he observed during his travels there in 1700-1708:

Most of the Savages are much addicted to Drunkenness, a Vice they never were acquainted with, till the Christians came amongst them. Some of them refrain drinking strong Liquors, but very few of that sort are found amongst them. Their chief Liquor is Rum, without any Mixture. This the English bring amongst them, and buy Skins, Furs, Slaves and other of their Commodities therewith. They never are contented with a little, but when once begun, they must make themselves quite drunk; otherwise they will never rest, but sell all they have in the World, rather than not have their full Dose. In these drunken Frolicks, (which are always carried on in the Night) they sometimes murder one another, fall into the Fire, fall down Precipices, and break their Necks, with several other Misfortunes which this drinking of Rum brings upon them; and tho' they are sensible of it, yet they have no Power to refrain this Enemy. About five years ago, when Landgrave Daniel was Governor, he summon'd in all the Indian Kings and Rulers to meet, and in a full Meeting of the Government and Council, with those Indians, they agreed upon a firm Peace, and the Indian Rulers desired no Rum might be sold to them, which was granted, and a Law made, that inflicted a Penalty on those that sold Rum to the Heathens; but it was never strictly observ'd, and besides, the young Indians were so disgusted at that Article, that they threatened to kill the Indians that made it, unless it was laid aside, and they might have Rum sold them, when they went to the Englishmen's Houses to buy it.

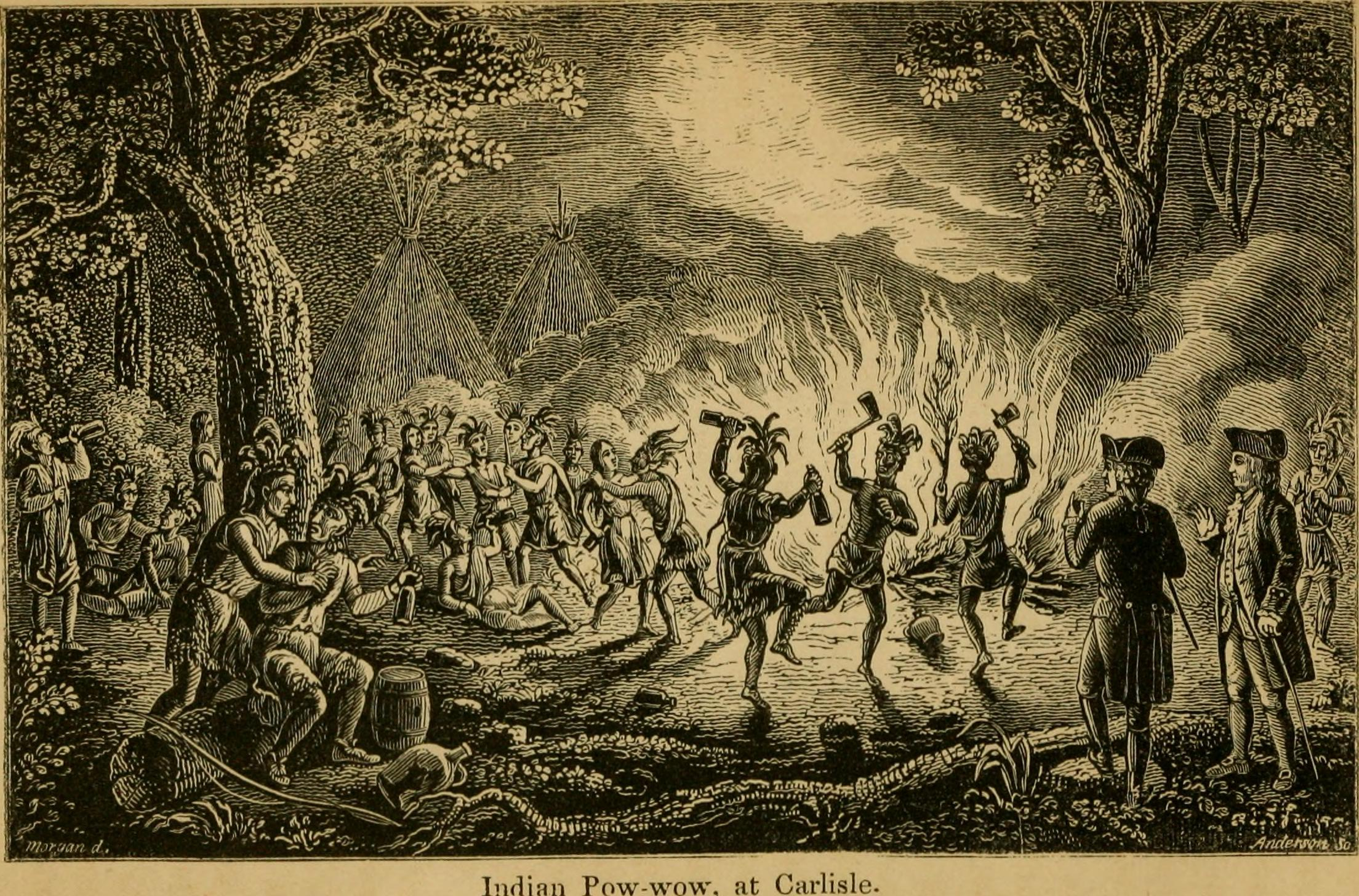
Dr. Thomas Bond with Benjamin Franklin (right) observing Iroquois dancing at the Carlisle conference.

European-American settlers often viewed immoderate drinking as a sign that Native American culture was decaying and was unable to cope with the modern world. The obliteration of indigenous cultures was often regarded as an inevitable consequence of "progress." In 1753, Benjamin Franklin witnessed a drunken brawl in Carlisle, Pennsylvania, after providing rum to a party of Iroquois in exchange for their cooperation during treaty discussions, and wrote in his autobiography:

[They] are extremely apt to get drunk, and when so are very quarrelsome & disorderly ... indeed if it be the Design of Providence to extirpate these Savages in order to make room for Cultivators of the Earth, it seems not improbable that Rum may be the appointed Means. It has already annihilated all the Tribes who formerly inhabited the Sea-coast.

At the same treaty conference, the Oneida leader Scarouady complained:

Your Traders now bring scarce any Thing but Rum and Flour. ... The Rum ruins us. We beg you would prevent its coming in such Quantities, by regulating the Traders ... We desire it may be forbidden, and none sold in the Indian Country. ... When these Whiskey Traders come, they bring thirty or forty Cags, and put them down before us, and make us drink; and get all the Skins that should go to pay the Debts we have contracted for Goods bought of the Fair Traders; and by this Means, we not only ruin ourselves, but them too. These wicked Whiskey Sellers, when they have once got the Indians in Liquor, make them sell their very Clothes from their Backs. In short, if this Practice be continued, we must be inevitably ruined: We most earnestly therefore beseech you to remedy it.

In 1773 the missionary David Zeisberger was preaching in Shawnee communities in Ohio when he encountered Chief Gischenatsi, who told the missionary that the sale of alcohol was a deliberate attempt to undermine indigenous culture:

As the white people understand the weakness and incapacity of the Indians, they have a certain power over us, while pretending that, with all their deception, they mean well by the Indians. They come and bring rum into our towns, offer it to the Indians and say, drink; this they will do until they become quite beside themselves and act as though they were out of their heads. [Then] the white people stand, and point at them with their fingers, laugh at them and say, see what great fools the Shawanose are. But who makes them so foolish, who is at fault?

=== Alcohol and cultural genocide ===
In his research for the Genocide Convention, Raphael Lemkin proposed that distribution of alcohol was one of several tools (such as forced relocations, destruction of cultural symbols, and "re-education" of children) by which European-American colonists committed cultural genocide in North America. Lemkin theorized that the availability of alcohol undermined social integrity, promoted violence, impeded organized resistance, and contributed to the assumption that Native Americans were culturally inferior. Lemkin argued that once a people becomes dependent on alcohol "the desire for cheap individual pleasure [would] be substituted for the desire for collective feelings and ideals based on a higher morality."

=== The effects of Indian removal and relocation ===
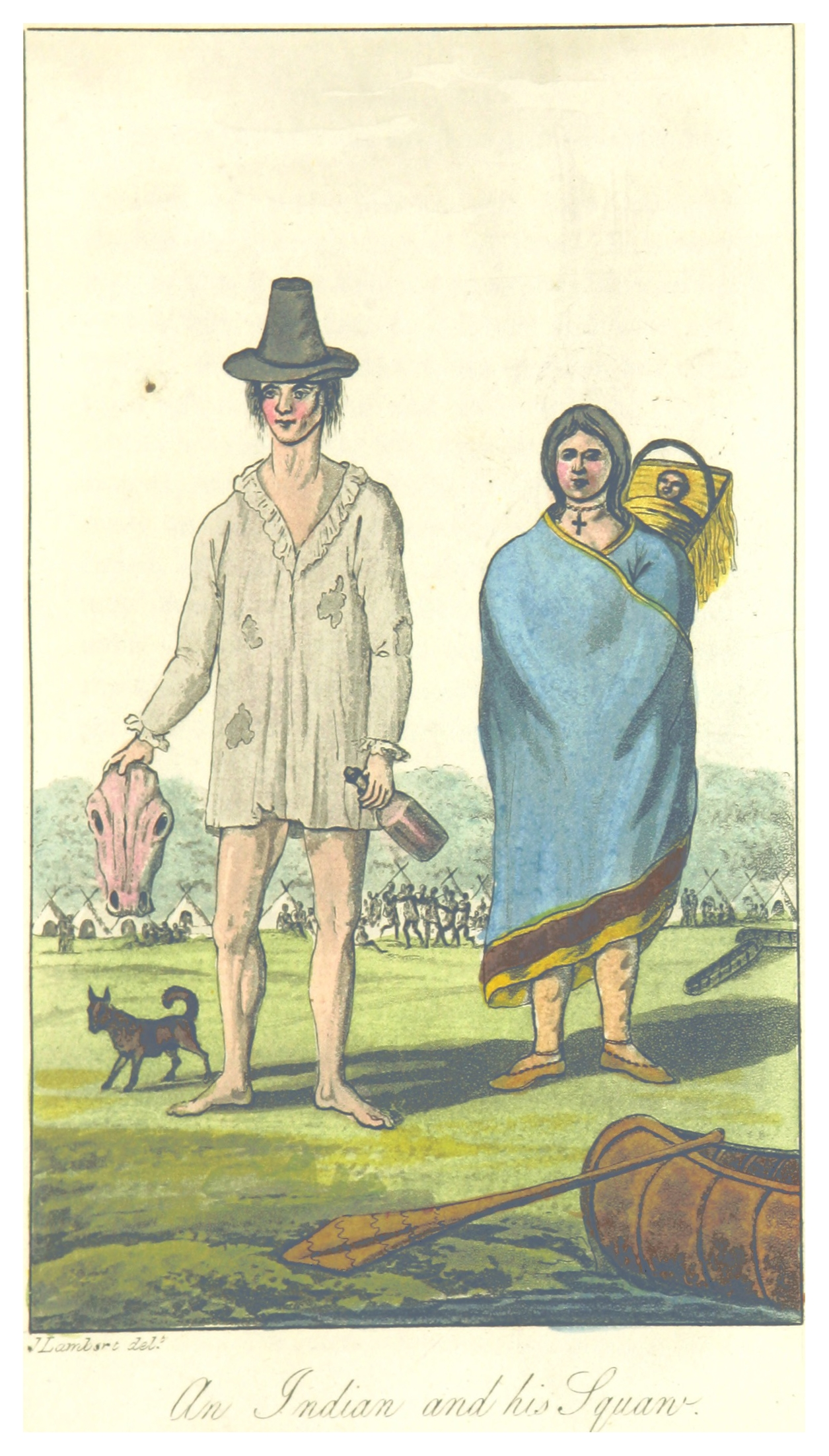
An Indian and His Squaw, 1816 drawing by John Lambert

Following the passage of the Indian Removal Act in 1830, large numbers of Native Americans were forcibly relocated to designated lands west of the Mississippi River. This created concentrated populations of displaced, demoralized, and often traumatized Indians, frequently resettled in desolate, barren country where hunting and farming were difficult. In this environment of an already-disrupted, fragmented society, the demand for alcohol was high, and white businessmen quickly discovered that bison hunters would trade hides for alcohol at a fraction of their commercial value. Hundreds of new businesses were established to take advantage of the growing market for buffalo hide, used for machinery belts, army boots, robes and rugs. On his wagon trip from the Arkansas to the South Platte in the winter of 1839–1840, Indian trader James Beckwourth bartered twenty gallons of whiskey for sixteen horses and over two hundred buffalo robes from the Indians. Beckwourth reported that "one pint of alcohol, costing no more than six cents [in Missouri], was [diluted] into five times the quantity of whiskey, usually one pint for one buffalo robe," which would sell for more than ten dollars in St. Louis. By 1841, businessman William Bent was shipping over 27,000 buffalo hides annually to St. Louis, most of them traded from Cheyenne, Arapahoe and Kiowa hunters in exchange for whiskey. To evade federal laws prohibiting whites from selling alcohol to Indians, many traders (including Bent) married Native American women and were formally inducted into their tribes.

During subsequent years alcohol further destabilized Native American communities. The Sauk warrior Black Hawk (1767-1838) wrote in his autobiography of the mistreatment of his people due to alcohol:

"The white people brought whisky to our village, made our people drink, and cheated them out of their homes, guns and traps. This fraudulent system was carried to such an extent that I apprehended serious difficulties might occur, unless a stop was put to it. Consequently, I visited all the whites and begged them not to sell my people whisky."

Indian Agent Richard Cummins at Fort Leavenworth wrote: "it is ardent spirits that causes many of them to steal one from another, to kill one another in combats when drunk, [and] to neglect all kinds of business." By the 1850s, tribal populations entered a steep decline. In 1857 the Kansa numbered 1,237, and by 1862 there were only 802. By 1872 tribal population was down to 700, with no males over the age of fifty-five. Other tribes shrank at a similar rate. The problem of alcohol use disorder worsened when in 1872 the Nonintercourse Act was amended to allow Indians to sell and trade alcohol among themselves.

The Indian Relocation Act of 1956 financed the relocation of over six thousand Native Americans from reservations to cities, and funded the establishment of job training centers. The program had devastating long-term effects. Many of the Native Americans relocated to urban areas found themselves homeless, unemployed, in poverty, without a strong cultural base or community and unable to achieve economic stability. Native Americans living in urban areas typically experience higher rates of alcohol use compared to other ethnicities as a result of acculturative stress directly and indirectly associated with historical trauma.

=== Legislation controlling access to alcohol ===
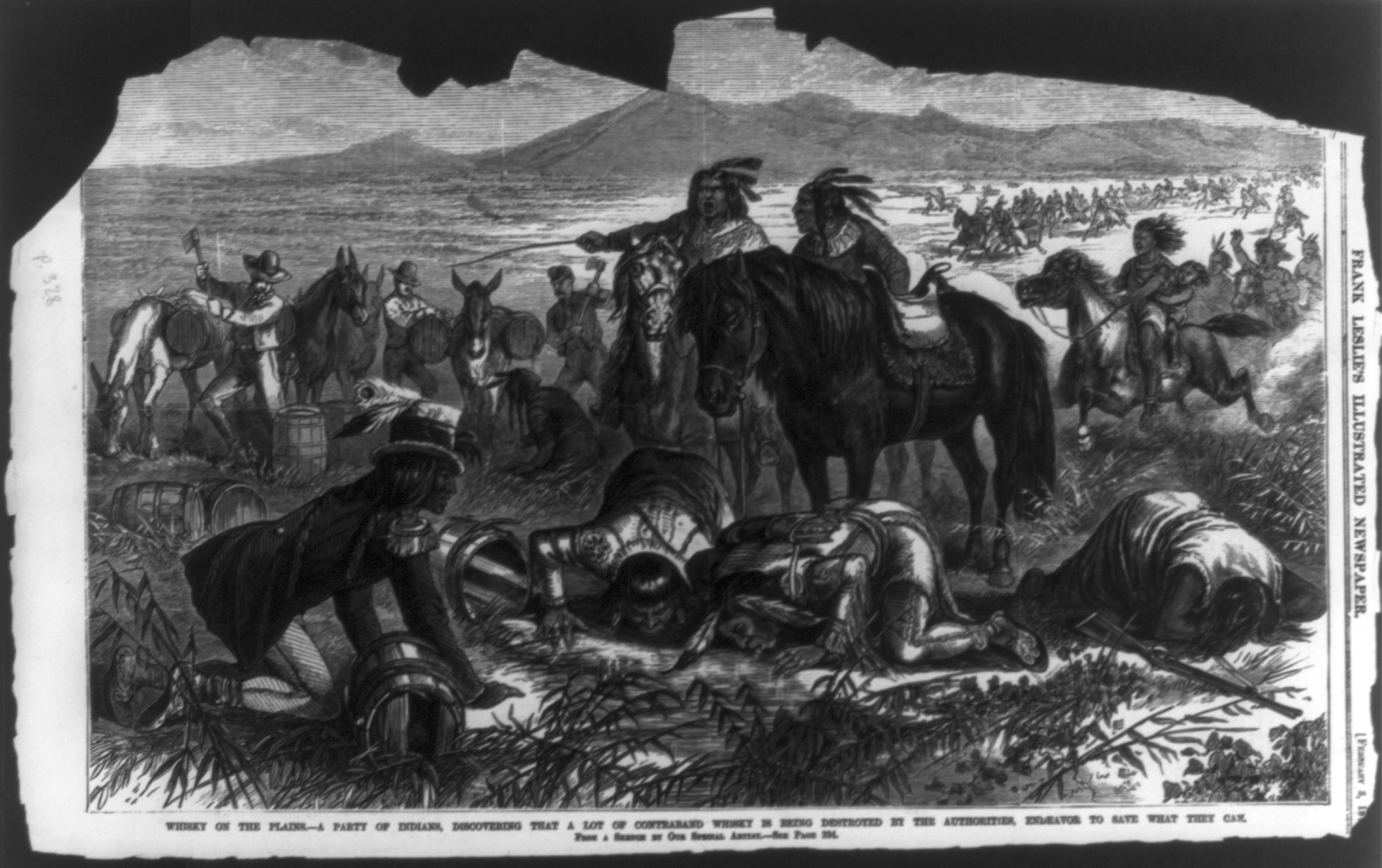
Indians drinking whiskey spilled as authorities destroy a contraband shipment. Caricature from Frank Leslie's Illustrated Newspaper, February 3, 1879.

By the early eighteenth century it had become clear that alcohol was harming Native American society and health. A series of local regulations were passed beginning as early as October 1701, when the Pennsylvania Assembly prohibited the sale of rum to the Indians, however as the law was poorly enforced and the penalty was light—a fine of ten pounds and confiscation of any illegal supplies—rum continued to be used to barter for furs. In 1745, partly due to the complaints of Shawnee chief Peter Chartier, the fine was doubled and the Shawnees were authorized to destroy any supplies of rum brought illegally into their communities. In 1767, regulations adopted at the Augusta Conference in the Province of Georgia attempted to limit the amount of alcohol brought into Native American communities to no more than fifteen gallons of rum, although this referred mainly to the Creek, Cherokee and Catawba Indians.

==== The Indian Nonintercourse Act ====
On 30 March 1802, federal action was taken to restrict the transport of alcohol into indigenous communities, when Congress (at the urging of Chief Little Turtle) passed the revised Indian Nonintercourse Act. The act authorized the president "to take such measures, from time to time, as to him may appear expedient to prevent or restrain the vending or distributing of spirituous liquors among all or any Indian tribes." But beyond giving the president responsibility for monitoring alcohol sold to Native Americans, the law made little difference to the expanding commercial sales of rum and whiskey along the frontier. No other conclusive action was taken until 1832, when the Office of Commissioner of Indian Affairs was created, primarily to settle land disputes, but also to restrict the sale of alcohol on Indian lands: "No ardent spirits shall be hereafter introduced, under any pretense, into the Indian country," stated the act which created this office.

Recognizing that penalties and exceptions needed to be written into law, Congress passed 25 U.S.C. § 177, "Act to regulate trade and intercourse with the Indian tribes, and to preserve peace on the frontiers" on 30 June 1834. Superseding the old Nonintercourse Act of 1802, it imposed a fine of $500 against anyone who "shall sell, exchange, or give, barter, or dispose of, any spirituous liquor or wine to an Indian, (in Indian country)." The law provided exceptions for alcohol intended for US government troops, and stipulated that any supplies of illegal alcohol could be confiscated and destroyed. An additional provision mandated a "$1,000 fine for setting up and operating a distillery in Indian Country for manufacturing ardent spirits" to prevent entrepreneurs from making alcohol rather than importing it. Immediate results were encouraging: by 1835 the first Commissioner of Indian Affairs, Elbert Herring, declared, "The exclusion of ardent spirits, where it could be effected, has done much good." This act was amended multiple times but remained in force until 1953.

==== Prohibition on Indian land ====
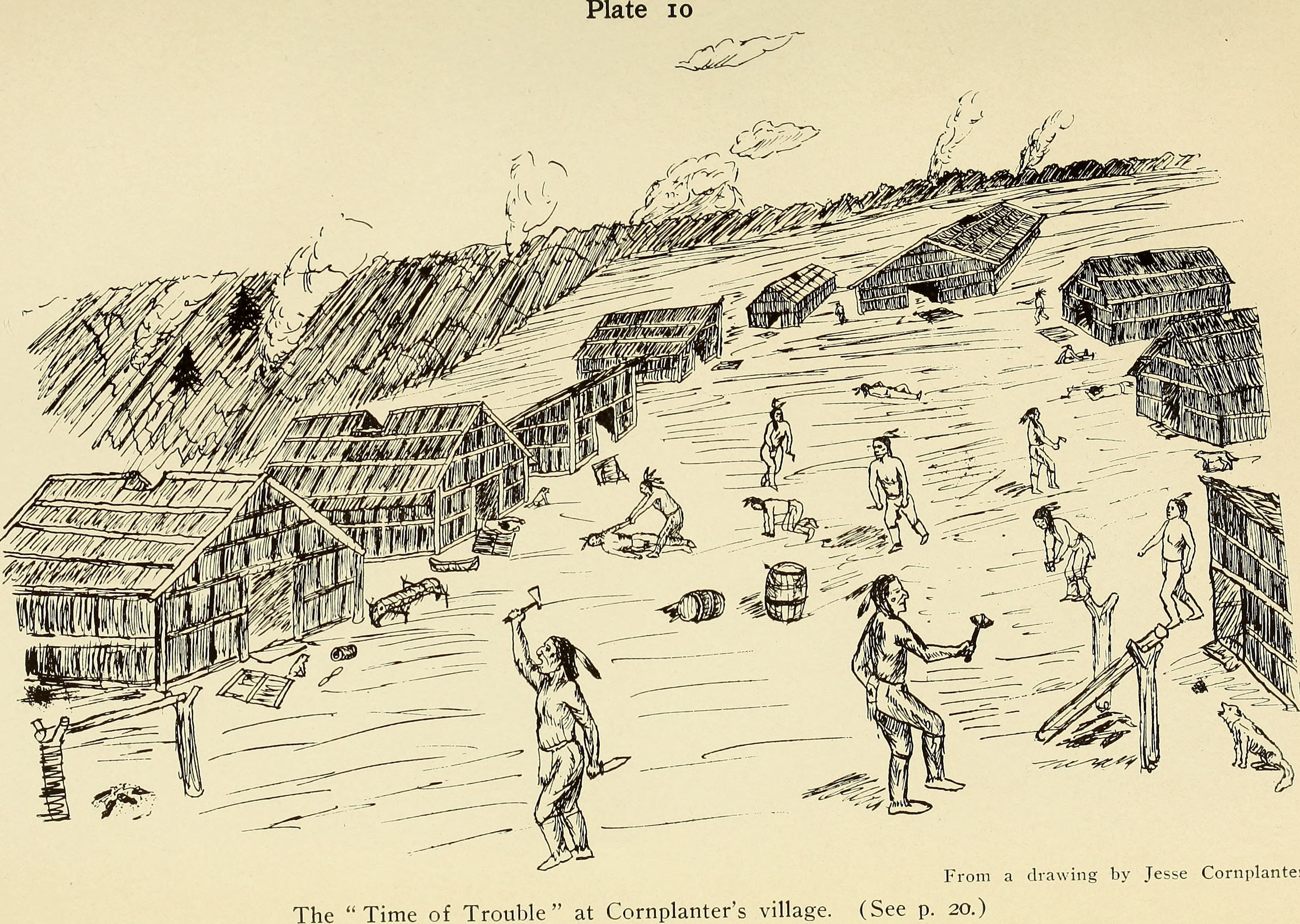
Illustration from the Code of Handsome Lake (1912): "Now that the party is home, the men revel in strong drink and are very quarrelsome. Because of this the families become frightened and move away for safety...The drunken men run yelling through the village." From a drawing by Jesse Cornplanter.

An 1847 amendment introduced prison terms for those convicted of selling or attempting to sell alcohol "in Indian country." It also prohibited the distribution of goods or annuities to Indians under the influence of liquor, or when there was ready access to liquor. Goods and annuities could not be distributed until chiefs "have pledged themselves to use all their influence, and to make all proper exertions, to prevent the introduction and sale of such liquor in their country." The problem with this law was that it did not prevent the sale of alcohol to Native Americans, but only that which occurred on Indian land. Alcohol could still be legally purchased in white communities by Native Americans, and taken home. In 1861 Commissioner William P. Dole reported: "Unprincipled traders, debarred by law from going upon the reservations, gather upon their borders, and by means of this traffic ... they filch from the Indian his little all, often reducing him to a state of utter want and destitution."

On 15 March 1864 an amendment was passed making it illegal to "sell, exchange, give, barter, or dispose of any spirituous liquors or wine to any Indian under the charge of any Indian superintendent or Indian agent appointed by the United States." In the decades following the US Civil War, it was illegal to sell alcohol to Indians, but it was not illegal for Native Americans themselves to buy alcohol. By 1891 most Native Americans living in the United States were confined to Indian reservations, but enforcing the prohibition of alcohol was difficult. Indians refused to testify against whites who sold them alcohol and juries were reluctant to convict businessmen, who were often reputable members of the community, based on the testimony of an Indian, usually a known alcoholic. Judges frequently imposed less than the maximum penalty on convicted offenders, sometimes ordering fines of $1 and prison terms of one day. In at least one case, the defendant was acquitted by a lenient judge even after pleading guilty.

In 1876 the US Supreme Court recommended that Congress take action to restrict the sale of alcohol near reservations. In United States v. Forty-Three Gallons of Whiskey, Associate Justice David Davis wrote the opinion of the court that

If liquor is injurious to them inside of a reservation, it is equally so outside of it; and why cannot Congress forbid its introduction into a place near by, which they would be likely to frequent? It is easy to see that the love of liquor would tempt them to stray beyond their borders to obtain it; and that bad white men, knowing this, would carry on the traffic in adjoining localities.

Such action has been taken locally in several states, including in 2017 when the Nebraska Liquor Control Commission voted to deny license renewals to the four liquor stores in Whiteclay, Nebraska, on the edge of the Pine Ridge Indian Reservation.

==== The problem of beer ====
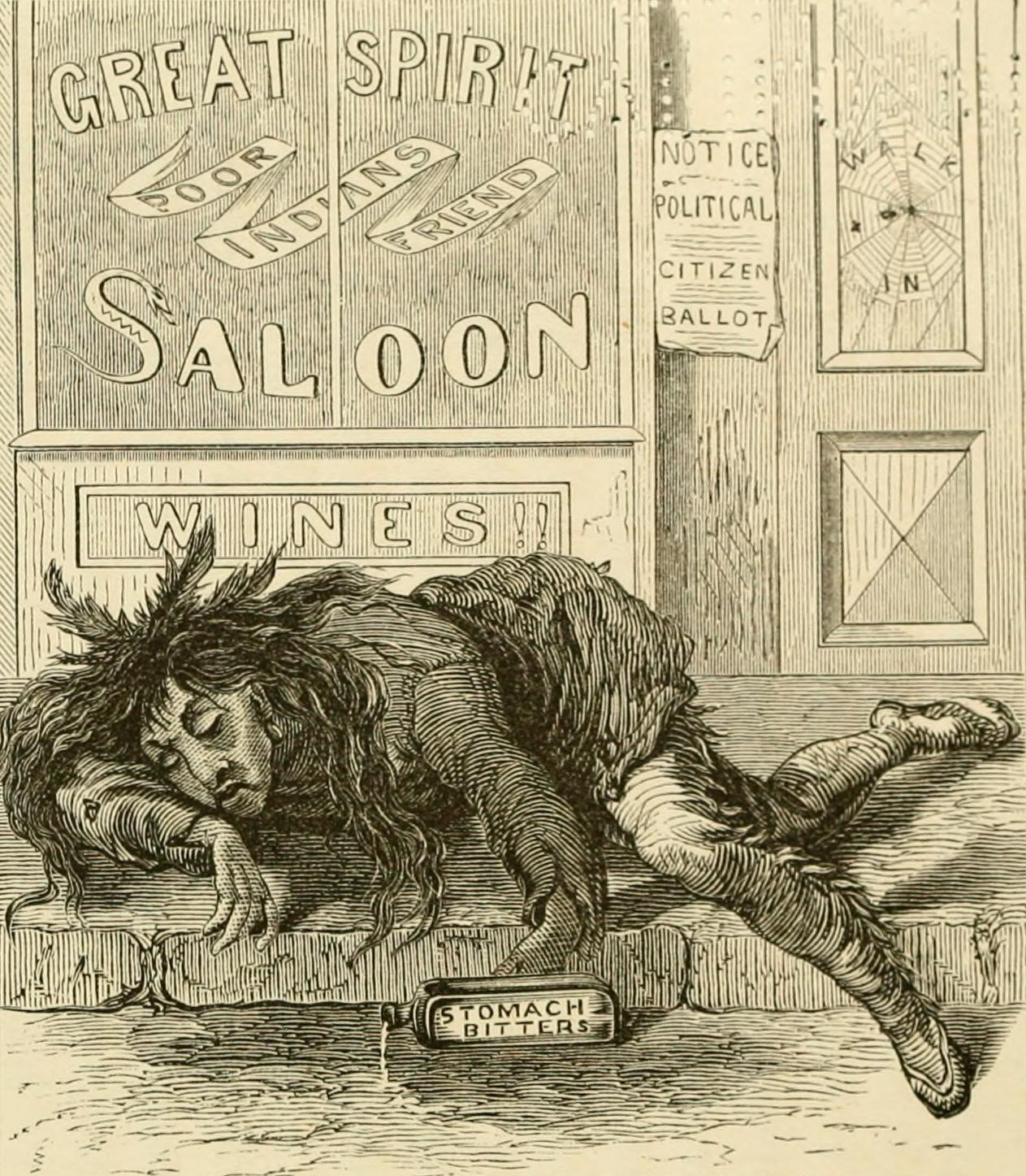
Patent medicines such as "Stomach Bitters" with a high alcohol content were often sold to Native Americans while the sale of alcoholic beverages was prohibited. Illustration from Buffalo Land by W. E. Webb, 1874.

In 1892 the United States District Court for the District of Montana found that beer was not included in the law's specification that "spirituous liquors" (which had included wine since 1834) were not to be sold or given to Indians. The result was a sudden introduction of beer saloons into reservations across the west. The agent in Muskegee, Indian Territory (Arkansas), reported "the opening of beer saloons in every village in the agency, almost without exception. The Indian and Federal laws were openly, flagrantly, and defiantly violated, drunkenness and its train of evils held full sway." Patent medicines such as Jamaica ginger and cooking flavors such as lemon extract with high alcohol content were sold in large quantities on reservations. The 1893 amendment to the law prohibited "ardent spirits, ale, beer, wine or intoxicating liquors or liquors of whatever kind," punishable with imprisonment for not more than two years and fines of not more than $300 for each offense. An 1897 amendment to the Indian Appropriations Act (29 Stat. at L. 506, chap. 109), provides:

That any person who shall sell, give away, dispose of, exchange, or barter any malt, spirituous, or vinous liquor, including beer, ale, and wine, or any ardent or other intoxicating liquor of any kind whatsoever, or any essence, extract, bitters, preparation, compound, composition, or any article whatsoever ... which produces intoxication, to any Indian ... shall be punished by imprisonment for not less than sixty days, and by a fine of not less than one hundred dollars."

==== The Heff decision ====
In 1905 the US Supreme Court overturned the 1904 conviction in Kansas of Albert Heff, who had been fined $200 and sentenced to four months in jail for selling two quarts of beer to an Indian. The Supreme Court ruled that a Native American granted citizenship through the 1887 Dawes Act is immediately a citizen of the US and his state, and that the 1897 amendment to the federal Indian Appropriations Act, which banned the sale of alcohol to Indians, would not apply, as "regulation of liquor was a state police power and not subject to federal legislation." The result was an immediate increase in the sale and consumption of alcohol in Native American communities. Lewis St. John, writing about the tribes of Washington State, says:

The year following the Heff decision saw an increase of the liquor traffic among the Indians of Puget Sound undreamed-of before. It spelled almost absolute ruin and prostration for the Puyallup Indians. Other agencies report a similar striking increase in the amount of drunkenness, crime, and death and a marked lowering of moral standards and civilization.

Congress attempted to remedy this situation by passing the Burke Act in 1906, and in 1916 the Supreme Court overruled the Heff decision in United States v. Nice (241 U.S. 591), which declared that Congress still retains plenary power to protect Native American interests when Native Americans are granted citizenship.

==== Repeal of discriminatory legislation ====
By this time, the Temperance movement in the United States had gained widespread support and National Prohibition was enacted in 1919 with the passage of the Eighteenth Amendment. In 1924 all Native Americans living in the United States became US citizens by passage of the Indian Citizenship Act, but even after Prohibition was ended in 1933 with the Twenty-First Amendment alcohol was still illegal on Indian reservations. In 1945 the Commissioner of Indian Affairs reported:

Indians feel that the prohibition, which singles them out as a racial group, is discriminating and brands them as inferior. Veterans of World War II, who were able to obtain liquor with no difficulty while in the armed forces, have made many protests against the existence of the law. Various Indian tribes passed resolutions urging that sale of liquor be permitted to Indians off the reservations."

During the next seven years Congress engaged in a heated debate over the dangers and benefits of repealing the "Indian liquor laws." An attempt to repeal laws in Wisconsin and Minnesota was defeated, but in 1953 a law to repeal the laws in Arizona was amended to include all Indian country within the US. The record noted:

The Indians for many years have complained that the liquor laws are most discriminatory in nature. ... Inasmuch as Indians are expected to assume the responsibilities of citizenship and serve in the Armed Forces on an equal basis with other Americans, the committee sees no reason for continuing legislation that is applicable only to Indians.

Within a few years, most tribes passed their own prohibition laws, but they were adopted by Indians for Indians, not imposed on them by the federal government. Discriminatory liquor legislation was never passed in Hawaii, where alcohol laws applied both to Native islanders and whites. In Alaska, liquor sales have been regulated by individual communities since 1986 as long as they conform to state laws.

It is now largely recognized that prohibition has been unsuccessful. As of 2007, 63 percent of the federally recognized tribes in the lower 48 states had legalized alcohol sales on their reservations. Tribes decided to retain revenues that previously would go to state governments through retail sales taxes on beer, wine and liquor. Legalizing sales enables the tribes to keep more money within their reservation economies and support new businesses and services, as well as to directly regulate, police and control alcohol sales. The retained revenues also provide funds for health care services and facilities to treat alcohol use disorder. In some cases, legalization of alcohol sales has also supported the development of resorts and casinos, to generate revenues for other economic enterprises.

== Native American temperance activists ==
A number of prominent Native Americans protested against the social and cultural damage inflicted by alcohol on indigenous communities, and encouraged others to avoid drinking. Initially, activists such as Peter Chartier, King Hagler and Little Turtle resisted the use of rum and brandy as trade items, in an effort to protect Native Americans from cultural changes they viewed as destructive. Later activists (William Apess and Samson Occom) framed temperance in terms of Christianity, conforming to a broader temperance movement in the United States. Others such as Neolin, Kennekuk, Handsome Lake, Quanah Parker, and Wovoka led revitalization movements to restore Native American dignity by reverting to traditional customs and ceremonies. Tenskwatawa, Yonaguska, and George Copway sought to achieve this by establishing alcohol-free communities. Religious movements such as the Indian Shaker Church and the Native American Church combined tradition with Christianity to attract a wider following. Modern-day addiction specialists like Don Coyhis integrate the psychology of substance use disorder treatment with traditional rituals and symbolism and with community rehabilitation to reduce stressors and help recovering alcoholics maintain a healthy lifestyle.

== Patterns ==
The 2012–2013 National Epidemiologic Survey on Alcohol and Related Conditions III (NESARC-III) found that 19.2% of Native Americans surveyed had had an alcohol use disorder during the previous twelve months, and 43.4% had had an alcohol use disorder at some time during their lives (compared to 14.0% and 32.6% of whites, respectively). This contrasts sharply with the 2015 National Survey on Drug Use and Health and National Survey of Substance Abuse Treatment Services, which surveyed adolescents and adults receiving treatment and found that 9.7% of Native Americans surveyed had had an alcohol use disorder during the previous twelve months (compared to 6.1% of whites). An analysis of surveys conducted between 2002 and 2016 determined that 34.4% of Native American adults used alcohol in 2016 (down from 44.7% in 2002), 21.6% engaged in binge drinking and 7.6% described their alcohol use as "heavy."

=== Gender differences ===
In her classic study on alcohol use among the Lakota Sioux, anthropologist Beatrice Medicine found that as Native Americans were crowded onto reservations, men lost their traditional social role as providers and started drinking to alleviate their feelings of powerlessness. She observed that Lakota women abstain from alcohol more frequently than men, or quit drinking once they bear children, due to strong cultural values associated with responsible motherhood. In many families women become caretakers, assisting alcoholic men when they are sick or in legal trouble. Within Lakota society there are few social controls on alcohol misuse, nor is there pressure to stay sober. Drunken behavior is excusable, and the family does not ostracize people with an alcohol use disorder but often provides them with shelter and food. She notes that there is constant peer pressure among men to join others in drinking as a social activity. Quitting alcohol then becomes a personal endeavor that requires substantial will power, introspection and sacrifice. Modern therapies attempt to connect treatment to traditional rituals emphasizing the individual's search for spiritual strength and guidance, such as the sun dance or vision quest.

A 2002 study looked at alcohol dependence and treatment in 172 Native American and Alaskan Native women who were in treatment at nine substance use disorder treatment centers in the west, southwest, northern plains, the midwestern US and Alaska. As part of the study, participants' records were examined to confirm self-reported information. Fifty-two staff members employed at the treatment centers were also interviewed. Among the participants, 81% had been emotionally, physically and/or sexually abused as children and 78% had been abused as adults. Over half had been abandoned by one or both parents, raised by relatives, sent to a boarding school, or had run away from home as a child. Seventy-two percent had been arrested at least once for an alcohol-related reason. The mean age of first alcohol use was 14, with some participants reporting first use as young as age 6. Many of the participants had been introduced to alcohol by a parent or an older sibling. Close to 100% of the study participants described using alcohol to suppress grief, self-pity and loneliness. Most of the women said that the death of a close family member, a divorce, or the end of an important relationship motivated them to drink regularly and heavily. Seventy-three percent reported drinking during pregnancy.

The leading obstacles preventing women from starting treatment were lack of child care and lack of affordable transportation. This was especially true for women living in isolated rural areas, but also pertained to women in cities with inadequate public transportation systems. Women also had to contend with resistance from partners who did not want them to start treatment. Many women cited confidentiality concerns as a reason for delaying treatment.

A primary motivation for Native American women to enter and complete treatment included maintaining or regaining custody of their children. Forty percent entered treatment due to a court order to avoid incarceration because of repeated criminal offenses such as driving while intoxicated. Twenty percent of participants were referred by a medical professional, sometimes because of pregnancy, with pressure or encouragement from family or friends as an important secondary motivation.

=== Tribal differences ===
There is considerable variation in the level of alcohol use and patterns of intake between tribes. This may be related to differing social tolerance of aberrant behavior when intoxicated, and certainly the socioeconomic conditions of different Native American communities play a role in alcohol misuse. Although drinking behavior has increased exponentially since colonization, since 1975 alcohol use patterns among Native Americans have remained constant. A 2003 study found that lifetime rates of alcohol dependence varied from 21 to 56 percent for men and 17 to 30 percent for women across seven geographically diverse American Indian tribes.

Beals et al. compared 1446 Native Americans living on a Southwest reservation with 1638 residents of a Northern Plains reservation, and examined their characteristics in relation to the US National Comorbidity Survey (NCS) conducted in 1990–1992. They found that alcohol dependence was more common in the Northern Plains sample (13.0%) than in the Southwest sample (12.2%), and both were higher than in the US sample (10.7%). Northern Plains women had a rate of alcohol dependence more than twice that of either US or Southwest women. The authors speculate that "Southwest women, as the carriers of tradition in this matrilineal culture, may have greater ties to their Native ways and thus be at less risk for the development of alcohol use disorders." Of those individuals in the Native American samples who sought professional help for a substance use disorder, 26.3% of the Southwest Indians went to a traditional or spiritual healer as compared to only 17.4% of those in Northern Plains sample.

Phillip A. May's in-depth examination of the epidemiology of alcohol use disorder and alcohol dependence among Native Americans (1994) found that tribes with a higher level of traditional social integration and less pressure to modernize had fewer alcohol-related problems. Tribes in which social interactions and family structure were disrupted by modernization and acculturative stress (i.e., young people leaving the community to find work) had higher rates of alcohol use and misuse. Native Americans living in urban areas have higher rates of alcohol use than those living in rural areas or on reservations, and more Native Americans living on reservations (where cultural cohesion tends to be stronger) abstain altogether from alcohol. May draws parallels to other societies affected by cultural change. Alaska Natives who follow a more traditional lifestyle have reported greater happiness and less frequent alcohol use for coping with stress.

Studies on drinking behavior among the Navajo and White Mountain Apache suggest that binge drinking occurs more commonly in communities that are more culturally distinct from white mainstream culture, as measured by education level, employment, and engagement in religious activities, and that alcohol is typically consumed intensively in intermittent, public social gatherings that attract the attention of law enforcement. The visibility of this behavior may have contributed to the idea that alcoholism is a serious problem in these communities, although contemporaneous studies also show that alcohol use among the Hopi leads to higher rates of alcoholic cirrhosis. The Hopi tend to drink in the privacy of their homes, on a daily basis, and many people report drinking alone. A comparison of the Navajo drinking patterns in 1969 with patterns of the same individuals in 1994 showed a transition towards solitary, daily drinking, although many Navajos quit drinking as they reached middle age, citing health concerns and religious beliefs.

=== Underage drinking ===
Surveys have shown that Native American youth are more likely to start drinking at a younger age, more likely to drink heavily, and more likely to suffer negative consequences of drinking than their non-Native counterparts. Among Native American adolescents, alcohol and drug use are statistically associated with living on a reservation, dropping out of school, legal problems, antisocial behavior, and socializing with alcohol-using peers. A 2012 study by researchers at Colorado State University surveyed 1399 students in 33 schools in 11 US states and found that 52.8% of all Native American 8th-graders and 67.5% of all Native American 12th-graders had experimented with alcohol, compared with 13.8% and 41.1% of non-Native students in the same schools. Researchers have seen higher rates of academic failure, delinquency, violent criminal behavior, suicidality, and alcohol-related mortality among Native American youth than in the rest of the United States population.

Psychosocial stressors play a significant role in alcohol use among Native adolescents. Of 89 Native American adolescents admitted to a residential substance use treatment facility, only 25.3% came from a family with both biological parents present; 73% had been victims of physical or sexual abuse, 22.9% were not in school prior to their admission to this program, and 32.3% were referred by a judge or a court.

Native American youth become socialized into the culture of alcohol at an early age, and this pattern of testing alcohol limits persists until early adulthood. Approximately 20 percent of Native American youth between 7th and 12th grade belong in this category. Other youth exhibit an experimental pattern of drinking through adolescence and this is noted as one of the biggest identifiers of binge drinking later in life.

=== Binge drinking ===
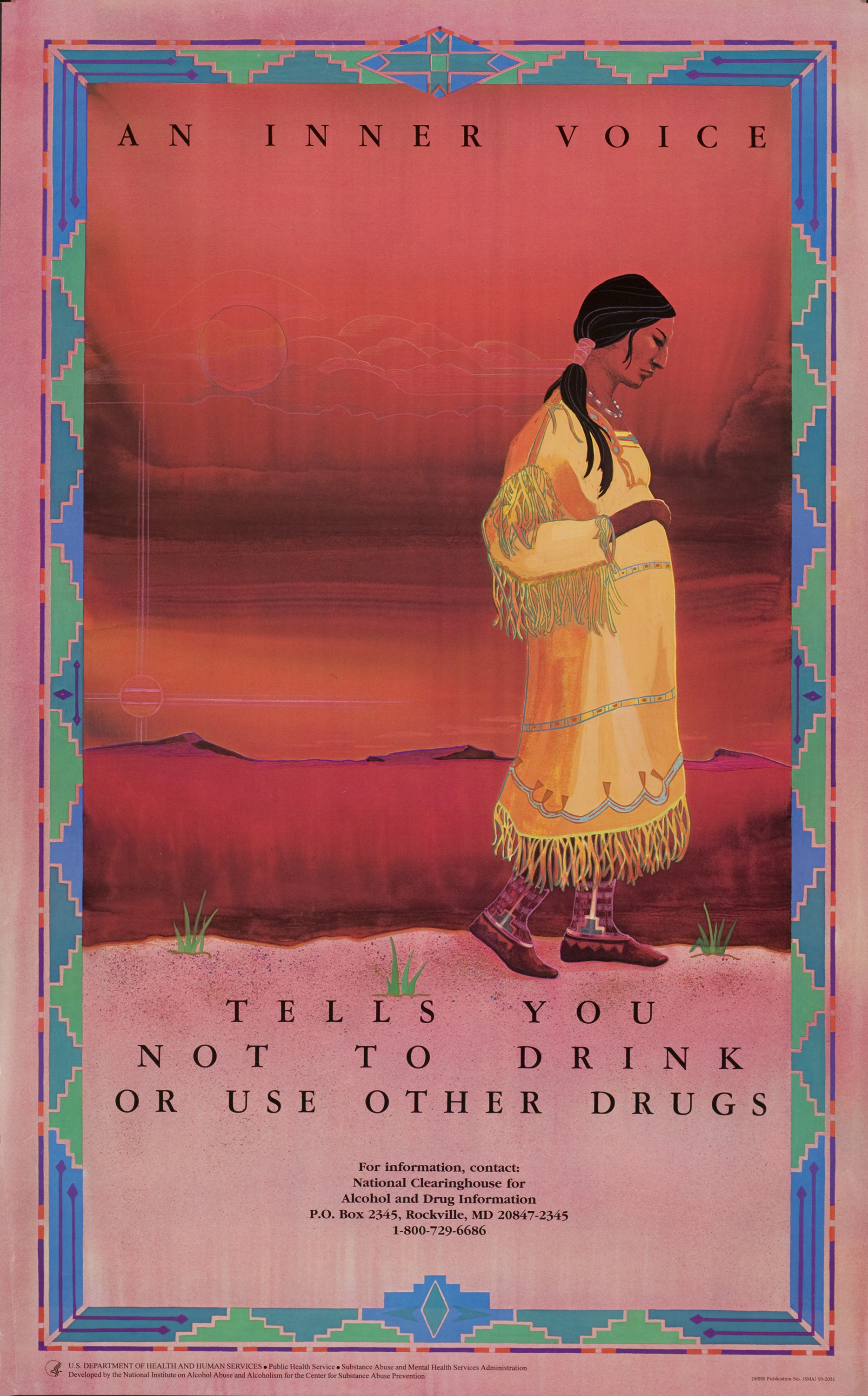
Poster directed at Native Americans, published by the National Institute on Alcohol Abuse and Alcoholism Center for Substance Abuse Prevention

The National Institute on Alcohol Abuse and Alcoholism, or NIAAA, defines binge drinking as a pattern of drinking that brings blood alcohol concentration (BAC) levels to 0.08 g/dL. This typically occurs after 4 drinks for women and 5 drinks for men, in about 2 hours. However, as Silk-Walker et al. point out, Native American drinking often does not conform to standard measurements as, for example, when a group shares one or more bottles. Binge drinking has less impact on health if enough time elapses between binges, however binge drinkers have a higher risk of death by accident, violence or alcohol poisoning as they are less accustomed to intoxication.

Anastasia M. Shkilnyk conducted an observational study of the Asubpeeschoseewagong First Nation of Northwestern Ontario in the late 1970s, when they were demoralized by Ontario Minamata disease, and observed that heavy Native American drinkers may not be physiologically dependent on alcohol, but they misuse it by engaging in binge drinking, a practice associated with child neglect, violence, and impoverishment.

Philip May (1996) found that the recreational drinking pattern of sporadic bingeing persists among many Native American drinkers throughout the early years that they drink, but that males often reach a turning point in their 30s and 40s when they quit drinking completely, for health reasons (42%), because they had joined the Native American Church (20%), because their responsibilities forced them to quit (18%), because they found drinking unrewarding (9%), or because they had joined an established Protestant church (4%).

A 2006 study found that 29.6% of Native Americans reported regular binge drinking as compared to 25.9% of Whites, 25.6% of Hispanics and 21.4% of African-Americans. The 2015 National Survey on Drug Use and Health and National Survey of Substance Abuse Treatment Services, which surveyed adolescents and adults receiving treatment, found that 3.0% of Native Americans aged 12 to 17 reported binge drinking during the previous twelve months (compared to 6.6% of Whites). Nonetheless, the overall rates of binge drinking appear to fluctuate: A National Center for Health Statistics survey showed 32.8% of Native Americans over age 12 reporting binge drinking in 2005, which fell to 18.2% in 2011 and rose to 22.7% in 2016.

At least one recent study refutes the presumption that Native Americans binge drink more than White Americans. Data from the National Survey on Drug Use and Health (NSDUH) from 2009 to 2013 showed that Native Americans compared to whites had lower or comparable rates of binge drinking. The survey included responses from 171,858 Whites compared to 4,201 Native Americans. Native American and White binge drinking (defined as 5+ drinks on an occasion 1–4 days during the past month) estimates were similar: 17.3% and 16.7%, respectively.

== Contributing factors ==
=== Genetic predisposition to alcoholism ===
The incidence of alcohol use disorder varies with gender, age, and tribal culture and history. While little detailed genetic research has been done, it has been shown that alcoholism tends to run in families with possible involvement of differences in alcohol metabolism and the genotype of the alcohol-metabolizing enzymes alcohol dehydrogenase and aldehyde dehydrogenase. Evidence that these genetic factors are more prevalent in Native Americans than other ethnic groups has been a subject of debate. According to one 2013 review of academic literature on the issue, there is a "substantial genetic component in Native Americans" and "most Native Americans lack protective variants seen in other populations." Another review of genetic studies from 2017 noted that few genetic studies of alcoholism in Native Americans had been done due to many Native American tribes' mistrust of scientists but stated that, in what few studies had been done, "the results are largely similar to findings in European-ancestry individuals indicating that [American Indians and Alaska Natives] do not have increased genetic risk for" alcoholism. Many scientists have provided evidence of the genetic component of alcoholism by the biopsychosocial model of alcoholism, but the molecular genetics research currently has not found one specific gene that is responsible for the rates of alcoholism among Native Americans, implying the phenomenon may be due to an interplay of multiple genes and environmental factors. Research on alcoholism in family systems suggests that learned behavior augments genetic factors in increasing the probability that children of alcoholics will themselves have problems with alcohol.

=== Firewater Narrative ===
After European contact, white drunkenness was often interpreted by other whites as the misbehavior of an individual. Native drunkenness was interpreted in terms of the inferiority of a race. What emerged was a set of ideas known as firewater myths that misrepresented the history, nature, sources and potential solutions to Native alcohol problems. These narratives claim that:

- American Indians have an inborn, insatiable appetite for alcohol.
- American Indians are hypersensitive to alcohol (cannot "hold their liquor").
- American Indians are inordinately vulnerable to addiction to alcohol.
- American Indians are inordinately prone to violence when intoxicated.
- These very traits produced immediate, devastating effects when alcohol was introduced to Native tribes via European contact.
- The solutions to alcohol problems in Native communities lie in resources outside these communities.

Don Coyhis and William L. White argue that these firewater narratives portrayed Native Americans as genetically inferior (inherently vulnerable to alcoholism) thus providing ideological support for the decimation and colonization of Native tribes, and that they continue to serve that function today. The scientific literature has refuted the claims to many of these narratives by documenting the wide variability of alcohol problems across and within Native tribes and the very different response that certain individuals have to alcohol as opposed to others. Research has not conclusively identified any genetic or biological anomalies that render Native peoples particularly vulnerable to alcoholism.

Assent to the firewater narrative is prevalent among Native American youth and many adults, and often leads to greater frequency and intensity of alcohol use. Such ideas can also prevent young people from seeking treatment for alcoholism due to a lack of confidence in their own ability to recover.

=== Historical trauma response ===
Historical trauma is psychological trauma resulting from physically and emotionally harmful or threatening experiences shared by a group over the lifespan and across generations. Maria Yellow Horse Brave Heart has argued that historical trauma plays a significant role in motivating substance misuse as a pathological coping strategy to deal with "low self-esteem, loss of cultural identity, lack of positive role models, history of abuse and neglect, self-medication due to feelings of hopelessness, and loss of family and tribal connections." Brave Heart has argued that there is a significant correlation between alcohol misuse, depression and suicide and the emotional responses to historical trauma such as disenfranchised grief and internalized oppression. Other research has also found that historical trauma is associated with substance use problems in Native American communities, and that treating this trauma in tandem with alcohol use disorder is more effective than substance use treatment without supplemental treatment of historical trauma.

=== Traumatic experiences and PTSD ===
Several studies have found higher-than-average rates of PTSD among Native Americans. At least one study found the prevalence of PTSD was as high as 21.9%. This rate is comparable to rates for groups experiencing severe and extreme events, such as mass shootings, major burns, and combat. Statistically, the incidence of alcohol misuse among survivors of trauma is significantly elevated, and survivors of physical, emotional and sexual abuse in childhood have among the highest rates of alcohol misuse.

== Consequences of alcohol misuse ==
=== Violence ===
Several studies indicate that Native Americans are at greater risk for alcohol-related domestic violence, rape, and assault compared with other U.S. ethnic groups. Alcohol and drug use is associated with higher rates of domestic violence among Native Americans compared to many other demographics. Over two-thirds (68%) of Native American and Native Alaskan sexual assault victims attribute their attacker's actions to drinking and/or taking drugs before the offense.

Certain risk factors have a high correlation with levels of domestic violence, including the offender and victim both being under the age of 40, presence of a substance use disorder, receiving public assistance, and the offender and/or the victim witnessing domestic violence between their parents as a child. For Native American abuse victims, the health care setting offers a critical opportunity for early identification and even primary prevention of abuse.

Alcohol consumption among Native Americans has also been linked to targeted hate crimes, such as Indian rolling, the Anchorage paintball attacks, the Saskatoon freezing deaths, and cases of missing and murdered Indigenous women.

=== Disease and death ===
Compared with the United States population in general, the Native American population is much more susceptible to alcoholism and related diseases and deaths. From 2006 to 2010, alcohol-attributed deaths accounted for 11.7 percent of all Native American deaths, more than twice the rates of the general U.S. population. The median alcohol-attributed death rate for Native Americans (60.6 per 100,000) was twice as high as the rate for any other racial or ethnic group. Males are affected disproportionately more by alcohol-related conditions than females. The highest risk of alcohol-related deaths is between 45 and 64 years of age. Chronic liver disease and cirrhosis are 3.9 times as prevalent in the Native American population than the general US population. Of all alcohol-attributable deaths, motor vehicle accidents account for 27.5% and alcoholic liver disease accounts for 25.2%. Alcohol-related fatal car accidents are three times more prevalent among Native Americans than in other ethnicities.

Alcohol was shown to be a factor in 69% of all suicides of Native Americans between 1980 and 1998. From 2003 to 2014, Native American suicide rates in the 18 states participating in the National Violent Death Reporting System were 21.5 per 100,000, more than 3.5 times higher than among other ethnicities in the US. Compared with whites, successful Native American suicides had 2.1 times the odds of a positive alcohol toxicology result and 1.8 times the odds of having had a reported alcohol abuse problem prior to suicide.

=== Fetal alcohol syndrome (FAS) ===
Native Americans have one of the highest rates of fetal alcohol syndrome recorded for any specific racial or ethnic subgroup in the US. According to the Centers for Disease Control and Prevention, from 1981 to 1991, the prevalence of FAS in the overall U.S. population per 10,000 births was 2.1. Among Native Americans, that number was 31.0. A CDC survey conducted from 2015 to 2017 found that 18.1% of Native American women drink during pregnancy (compared to 8.6% of Hispanic and 10.7% of white women) and that 5.1% engage in binge drinking. The significant difference between the FAS rates of the U.S. population and Native Americans has been attributed to a lack of healthcare, high poverty levels, and a young average population. Healthcare spending for an average American on Medicare is about $11,762 whereas average spending on healthcare for a Native American is $2,782. In a 2007 document, "Fetal Alcohol Spectrum Disorders among Native Americans," the U.S. Department of Health and Human Services reported that the prevalence of fetal alcohol syndrome in Alaska was 1.5 per 1,000 live births but, among American Indians and Alaska Natives, the rate was 5.6. The rate of FAS among different tribal groups varies widely. Among the Navajo and Pueblo tribes, the rate of FAS is more similar to the overall rate for the United States, while among the Southwest Plains Native Americans there is a much higher rate of one per every 102 live births.

=== Protective dietary practices ===
Dietary practices in Mesoamerica differ from those of Native North American peoples, and some foods commonly consumed in Latin America may prevent some of the effects of chronic alcohol misuse. High concentrations of thiamine found in beans may prevent alcohol-induced Beri-beri. Soaking maize in alkaline "limewater," as in the traditional preparation of corn tortillas, frees niacin and folate for human biological use, (a process known as Nixtamalization) thus preventing alcohol-induced pellagra and macrocytic anemia.

== Treatment programs ==
=== Treatment models ===
Treatment for alcohol use disorder among Native Americans is usually based on one of the five common treatment models:

- the medical model, based on the disease theory of alcoholism, which holds that it can be treated with coerced abstinence and medications in a clinical setting, the general approach of most US treatment facilities.
- the psychosocial model, which assumes that drinking is a maladaptive response to psychological trauma, social pressures and family dynamics, and that it can be managed 1) by educating the drinker to use other behavior patterns to cope with stress, and 2) by developing strong peer support and social support networks. This is the approach favored by Alcoholics Anonymous.
- the assimilative model, in which standard treatments are employed in a Native American setting operated by Native American practitioners.
- the culture-sensitive model, in which Native American counselors facilitate group therapy sessions with emphasis on Native American cultural and historical themes.
- the syncretic model, which has primarily a Native American orientation, including the use of traditional modalities such as the medicine wheel, talking circles, the sweat lodge, and traditional healers. The Red Road is one example of a specifically Native American treatment approach.

Treatment for alcohol dependence usually relies on a combination of:

- Alcohol detoxification and medically managed withdrawal from the physical dependence induced by chronic alcohol misuse, usually implemented during a brief hospital stay.
- Partial hospitalization where the patient continues to reside at home, but commutes to a treatment center up to seven days a week.
- Residential treatment, either long-term (6–12 months) or short-term (3–6 weeks), commonly referred to as rehabilitation.
- Outpatient treatment programs, including Intensive outpatient programs (IOPs).
- Individualized counseling
- Group counseling

=== SAMHSA's Office of Tribal Affairs and Policy ===
The Office of Tribal Affairs and Policy (OTAP) serves as primary point of contact between the Substance Abuse and Mental Health Services Administration (SAMHSA) and tribal governments, tribal organizations, and federal agencies on behavioral health issues that impact tribal communities. OTAP supports SAMHSA's efforts to implement the Tribal Law and Order Act (TLOA) of 2010 and the National Tribal Behavioral Health Agenda. The Office of Indian Alcohol and Substance Abuse (OIASA), an organizational component of OTAP, coordinates federal partners and provides tribes with technical assistance and resources to develop and enhance prevention and treatment programs for substance use disorders, including alcohol.

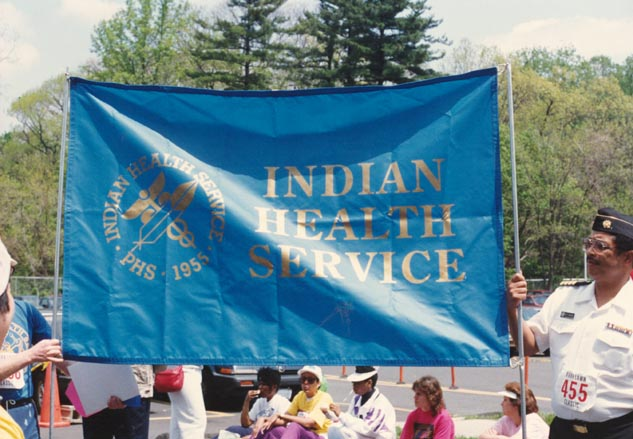
1992 photograph featuring the banner of the Indian Health Service

=== Indian Health Services ===
The Alcohol and Substance Abuse Program (ASAP) is a program for American Indian and Alaska Native individuals to reduce the incidence and prevalence of alcohol and substance use disorders. These programs are administered in tribal communities, including emergency, inpatient and outpatient treatment and rehabilitation services for individuals covered under Indian Health Services. It addresses and treats alcoholism from a disease model perspective.

=== Tribal Action Plan ===
The Indian Alcohol and Substance Abuse Prevention and Treatment Act of 1986 was updated in 2010 to make requirements that the Office of Indian Alcohol and Substance Abuse (OIASA), a subdivision of SAMHSA, is to work with federal agencies to assist Native American communities in developing a Tribal Action Plan (TAP). The TAP coordinates resources and funding required to help mitigate levels of alcohol and substance use disorders among the Native American population, as specified in the Indian Alcohol and Substance Abuse Memorandum of Agreement of August 2011, and executed by OIASA.

=== Organizations ===
- National Indian Health Board: Tribal Behavioral Health Agenda
- Youth Regional Treatment Centers (YRTC) funded by the Indian Health Service, provide clinical evaluation, substance use disorder education, psychotherapy, art therapy, adventure-based counseling, life skills, medication management, evidence-based treatment, aftercare relapse prevention, and post-treatment follow-up services.
- Native American Connections: Behavioral Health Services
- White Bison Recovery Resources
- Native American Indian General Service Office of Alcoholics Anonymous
- American Indian Committee on Alcohol and Substance Abuse, as of 2017, was over 4 decades old and was included in the 2-volume Encyclopedia of American Indian Issues Today, published 2013.
- SAMHSA's Tribal Training and Technical Assistance Center provides Native American communities with tools for preventing mental illness, substance use disorders and suicide.
- Native American Health Center's focus is the San Francisco Bay Area.
- Native American Indian Alcoholics Anonymous
- The Wellbriety Movement is an interconnected web carrying the message of cultural knowledge about recovery for individuals, families, and communities.
- One Sky Center, a National Resource Center for American Indian and Alaska Native Health, Education and Research dedicated to quality health care across Indian Country.
- Indian Country Child Trauma Center (ICCTC) develops trauma-related treatment protocols, outreach materials, and service delivery guidelines specifically designed for American Indian and Alaska Native (AI/AN) children and their families.
- First Nations Behavioral Health Association
- Society of TRUTH (Tribal Families, Rural and Urban, Together Healing), a coalition of American Indian/Alaskan Native organizations providing information and resources to support indigenous ways of life, healing and wellness.
- The National Council of Urban Indian Health (NCUIH), a national organization devoted to the support and development of quality, accessible, and culturally-competent health services for American Indians and Alaska Natives (AI/ANs) living in urban settings.

=== Issues in the treatment of Native Americans ===
Although Alcoholics Anonymous grew out of an explicitly European-American theistic tradition, studies show that some Native Americans prefer treatments that combine tribal practices with traditional AA therapy. Many Native American clients find AA's model objectionable, however, due to the confessional nature of meetings, the encouragement of a critical attitude towards drinkers, and an emphasis on a Judeo-Christian conceptualization of God. Among the Lakota Sioux and some other Northern Plains tribes, the repetitive identification of oneself as an alcoholic is considered to be a hindrance to recovery. In addition to a preference for treatment oriented towards traditional Native American values and customs, most Native clients prefer tribal-specific practices, rather than a Pan-Native approach. Therapy can be an opportunity for Native Americans to reaffirm their cultural heritage.

Alcohol treatment facilities that cater specifically to Native Americans can be difficult to find outside of rural areas or reservations because Native Americans account for less than 1.7% of the United States population. Coyhis and White make five recommendations in regard to the treatment of Native Americans for alcohol problems:

- In order to create a firm and effective relationship between the treatment agency and the tribal community, counselors and clinicians should understand the cultural and historical context that has provoked alcohol misuse, and be familiar with the organization, histories, values, ceremonies and cultures of Native Americans with whom they work. Counselors should be aware of the enormous diversity in personal experiences, personalities, spiritual beliefs, and acculturation, as well as the differing patterns of alcohol misuse and the multiple treatment modalities available.
- Counselors should take the time to master the cultural etiquette appropriate for each client in terms of verbal communication (greetings, humor, establishing rapport) and non-verbal signals (eye contact, touch, paralanguage, boundaries of personal space). Such etiquette varies between and within tribes.
- Family and community play an essential role in any individual's motivation to stay in recovery. Family members, tribal elders, and traditional healers should be encouraged to participate in designing and delivering treatment. Transgenerational trauma can be a significant factor in young people's substance use disorder patterns.
- Treatment can be made more effective by combining Native and Western healing practices. Group therapy may incorporate ceremonial activities such as the Spirit Dance, the Sun Dance and the Gourd Dance. Treatments should make clear reference to traditional Native values such as patience, generosity, cooperation, and humility, and to teaching metaphors like the medicine wheel. Therapeutic activities may make use of symbols including the sacred pipe and eagle feathers, rituals such as the sweat lodge, drum circles or smudging ceremonies, and to traditional arts like woodcarving, beadwork and silversmithing. Traditional Native legends can be used as a framework for therapeutic storytelling.
- Alcohol treatment and recovery services should focus on broader goals related to Native communities rather than limiting themselves to individual therapy. Throughout history, religious and cultural revitalization movements have played a crucial role in mitigating the impact of alcohol on Native communities. Addiction treatment agencies and counselors can become actively involved in communities by emphasizing the connection between personal health and community health, so as to build a culture of abstinence, healthy substitution, or conscientious moderation.

=== Alcohol education and prevention programs ===
A variety of substance use disorder prevention efforts, both face-to-face and web-based, have been implemented to build self-esteem and combat alcoholism among Native American and Native Alaskan youth. Researchers have found that standard substance misuse prevention programs are less effective among Native Americans because of the poor understanding of the unique historical and sociopolitical context of each tribe. One program used motivational interviewing with Native American adolescents aged 14 to 18 living in urban communities in California. Focus groups were designed to help participants explore and resolve their ambivalence about drug and alcohol use. A systematic review of programs in which both students and parents participated revealed that restrictive disciplinary measures used by parents often have a counterproductive effect, and that drug and alcohol use by family members was a stronger influence on early use by adolescents than such behavior among non-family peers. The use of a Native American Talking Circle Intervention among Cherokee adolescents in an Oklahoma school promoted self-efficacy and reduced substance misuse by 45% over the course of 8.5 weeks.

From January 1994 until May 31, 2002, the Robert Wood Johnson Foundation funded the Healthy Nations Initiative to help Native Americans reduce the demand for and use of alcohol and illegal drugs. Healthy Nations provided funds for public education, substance misuse treatment, post-treatment follow-up, and supporting services for 14 Native American tribes, incorporating traditional Native American cultural values to encourage youth to avoid drinking, drug use and smoking.

Prevention programs have used innovative strategies to promote healthy substitution and alternatives to drinking in Native American communities. With the help of Bernie Whitebear, the Seattle Indian Health Board developed technology-focused youth mentoring projects in partnership with the American Indian Science and Engineering Society. The Cherokee Nation of Oklahoma actively engaged up to 1,000 members in increasing physical activity and healthy lifestyles, initiating cultural heritage projects and a school-based health promotion curriculum which included alcohol education. Norton Sound Health Corporation, based in Nome, Alaska, instituted a Village-Based Counselor program to provide much-needed behavioral health services to its more remote villages. Lechner et al. have analyzed the responses to psychological and historical trauma among Native American youth and developed a series of interventions, including life skills development, suicide prevention training, talking circle paradigms, and "Healing the Canoe," a substance abuse prevention program based on promoting a sense of belonging and cultural identity.

== See also ==
- Alcohol in New France
- Contemporary Native American issues in the United States
- Indian rolling
- Methamphetamine and Native Americans
- Missing and Murdered Indigenous Women in Utah
- Modern social statistics of Native Americans
- Native American health
- Navajo reservations and domestic abuse
- New World syndrome
- Peter Chartier
- Reservation poverty
- Whiteclay, Nebraska
