= Anchorage paintball attacks =

2001 drive-by shootings in Alaska

The Anchorage paintball attacks of January 14, 2001, were a series of pre-meditated and racially motivated drive-by shootings targeted at Alaska Natives in downtown Anchorage that night. These attacks, described by the news media and by Alaska legislators as hate crimes, and by Anchorage mayor George Wuerch as "racism at its worst", sparked a broader debate about race relations in Alaska.

== Incident ==
On Sunday, January 14, 2001, the three individuals—19-year-old Charles Deane Wiseman and two juveniles whose names were not released, all of whom were residents of Eagle River—entered Anchorage in a 1999 Subaru Impreza registered to Wiseman's parents. With them they carried a video camera, a paintball gun, and paintball ammunition which allegedly had been frozen solid.

According to statements captured by their video-recording during the 15-mile (24 km) drive prior to the shootings, the three boys had traveled into Anchorage for the specific purpose of locating "Eskimo" pedestrians, particularly those whom they believed to be walking about drunk, and paintballing them. One of the unnamed minors drove the car and fired only one paintball. Wiseman himself filmed the escapade from the back seat. The third perpetrator, also 17, rode in the front passenger seat and fired all the remaining paintball shots.

In one part of the videotape the assailants are seen posing as tourists from California and asking a 52-year-old Nome man, whether he was drunk. Satisfied by the pedestrian's frank admission that he was "always drunk" and had struggled with alcoholism since age 14, they promptly shot him in the face. In another segment they are seen sparing a pedestrian whom they had intended to shoot, embarrassed upon realizing that their would-be victim was in fact Chinese.

Several victims and witnesses contacted the Anchorage police to report the shootings. One man informed a patrol officer that he had been shot, but was subsequently arrested for disorderly conduct due to his intoxicated state and lack of obvious wounds.

Several of the victims correctly reported the license plate number of the attackers, leading police back to Eagle River, where they confiscated the paintball gun and the videotape. Despite knowing the identity of all three suspects, and having watched the videotape, they made no arrests until March 20, citing lack of evidence. Wiseman was charged with seven counts of misdemeanor assault for his alleged role of videotaping the attacks and luring victims closer to the car. Prosecutors declined to indicate whether charges would be filed against the shooter and the driver, but Chugiak High School did suspend both juveniles.

== Reaction of Alaska legislature ==
On March 22, the Alaska House of Representatives announced that they had unanimously passed Joint Resolution No. 22 which condemned the incident as a hate crime, urged "swift prosecution and punishment of the perpetrators", and asked the Alaska Commission on Civil Rights to investigate the attacks. The resolution was amended by the Alaska Senate—to only condemn "unlawful" discrimination—by a vote of 16–2. The Alaska congress also began drafting Alaska's first "misdemeanor hate crime" legislation, making otherwise similar offenses more serious if they are motivated by personal bias.

== Aftermath ==
Charles Deane Wiseman changed his plea to that of no contest on July 23, 2001, and was sentenced August 31 to six months imprisonment, plus a $6,000 fine, plus 300 hours community service. Wiseman was being held in solitary confinement, reportedly to protect him from other inmates, but forty days into Wiseman's sentence his attorney Robert Herz argued that this was too severe for a first-time offender, and requested that the remainder of Wiseman's sentence be downgraded to an electronically monitored house arrest (ankle bracelet). This was denied. It remains unclear what penalties the two juveniles may have received.

The incident inspired governor Tony Knowles to appoint a 14-member "Commission on Tolerance" which reported back to him with over 100 recommendations for improving race relations in the state of Alaska. This list included more new hate crime laws, increased funding for schools in rural villages, and even adding new verses to "Alaska's Flag" (the state song) to recognize contributions of aboriginal natives.
