= National Violent Death Reporting System =

American active surveillance system

The National Violent Death Reporting System (abbreviated NVDRS) is an active surveillance system initiated by the Centers for Disease Control for collecting data regarding violent deaths in the United States. It does not collect any of its own data, but rather relies on data collected by other systems. It provides a unique advantage over other violent death reporting systems, as it creates a centralized database of relevant information. The initiative involves collaboration between state agencies and local police, coroners, and medical examiners, with the goal of creating a more complete and up-to-date database of violent deaths and their circumstances in the United States.

== History ==
In 1999, six foundations pooled their resources to create the National Violent Injury Statistics System (NVISS), which also collected data regarding violent deaths and developed many of the techniques necessary to do so at multiple locations. In 2000, a group of experts recommended that the Centers for Disease Control create a publicly funded system similar to the NVISS. In 2002, US Congress appropriated funding for the system for the first time. and the system was established that year.

The NVDRS began collecting data in 2003 from six states, a number that increased to 17 by 2006 and 32 by 2016. In November 2008, the system and its accompanying data became freely accessible online. In 2013, the NVDRS moved to an online system that made accessing its data easier. As of 2023, 48 states, the District of Columbia, and Puerto Rico participated in NNVDRS.
