= Native American Health Center =

The Native American Health Center (NAHC) is a non-profit organization serving California's San Francisco Bay Area Native Population and other under-served populations in the Bay Area since 1972.

The Native American Health Center, Inc. was founded in 1972 as the Urban Indian Health Board, Inc. NAHC operates two sites in San Francisco, two sites in Oakland, one site in Richmond, and eight school based health centers. NAHC provides medical, dental and family services to Native Americans and the residents of the surrounding communities. Services include primary care, pediatrics, women's health, nutrition and fitness, case management, HIV/HCV prevention and care coordination, behavioral health including but not limited to substance abuse prevention and recovery, family counseling, youth counseling and trauma-based services, and support for families with young children including women infants and children (WIC).

== Patients ==
The Native American Health Center serves a wide range of communities in the Bay Area. The organization offers healthcare services to anyone regardless of any tribal affiliations. There are no requirements on ethnicity or residency. The organization's patients are on average 37% Latinx, 21% Native American, 20% African American, 12% Euro American, 9% Asian/Pacific Islander, and 1% unknown. Based on an average taken in 2011, the Native American Health Center serves roughly 11,265 patients in the Bay Area per year. While healthcare services are provided to everyone regardless of their relationship to any native communities, the center does have specialized services and events specifically for native people. As stated in their mission, their goal is to "provide comprehensive services to improve the health and wellbeing of American Indians, Alaska Natives, and residents of the surrounding communities, with respect for cultural and linguistic differences."

== Staff ==
The Native American Health Center has roughly 225 employees ranging from HR administrators to practicing dentists. The majority of employees at the organization are Native American at roughly 36.9%. The rest of the organization's employees are 20.4% white, 16.5% Hispanic/Latinx, 18% Asian/Pacific Islander, 9.3% African American, and 1.6% Unknown/Other. Staff work to serve the community in a holistic way in ten different departments: Administration, Human Resources, Nutrition + Fitness, School Based Health Centers, Women/Infant/Children or WIC, Community Wellness Department, Medical, Dental, Youth Services, and Behavioral Health.

== Events and groups ==
While the Native American Health Center is a fully functioning center for healthcare, they also have many social events to specifically serve the indigenous and native communities in cultural and community ways as opposed to medical. Events and groups are frequently held at the Sage Center located on 3124 International Blvd. in Oakland, California, the Circle of Healing located on 160 Capp Street in San Francisco, California, and the Native Wellness Center on 2566 Macdonald Avenue in Richmond, California. Groups and events are for youth all the way to elders and include:

- Beading Circleo
- Cross Stitching Circle
- Men's Drum Circle
- Memoir in Collage
- Healthy Living Circle
- Talking Circle
- Flicker Feather
- All Nations Red Road
- Elder Group
- White Bison
- Tribal Athletics
- Traditional Arts
- Educational Support
- Cultural Activities and Events
- Young Warriors Society and Young Women's Group
- Chae-Mal Wilderness Program
- Family Nights and Outings
- Drop-in Center
- Case Management & Referrals
- Leadership Development
- Summer Program
- Youth Fellowship
- Youth Council
- Media Classes

The Native American Health Center also hosts the Indigenous Red Market, a free community event promoting native vendors, artists, music, resources, and more. The market takes place the first Sunday of every month in Fruitvale.

== History ==
There are many people native to the San Francisco Bay Area. The Ohlone People, the Coast Miwok, and the Pomo People are the original inhabitants of the area. The arrival of the Europeans in the 1500s disrupted their traditional way of life and resulted in a steady decline of the Native American population. The decline continued until the 1950s, when the Federal Bureau of Indian Affairs' relocation program moved tens of thousands of Native Americans from reservations across the country to urban centers like San Francisco and Oakland. Although the relocation program was voluntary, many felt coerced by the promise of jobs, housing, health care, and a better life. Many of these promises were kept by the Bureau of Indian Affairs who send relocated Native Americans to training schools, assisted them with a housing subsidy and provided job search and placement. However, many of these services were substandard and inconsistent, resulting in a disenfranchised community. While some of those relocated eventually returned to reservations, many stayed and formed their own community in the Bay Area.

During the late 1960s and early 1970s, the Bay Area Native American community responded to the challenges of urban lifestyle and the broader cultural shifts taking place in society. New Native American run organizations were formed to address the needs for self-determinations and self-sufficiency.

Today, the Bay Area is home to one of the largest concentrations of Native Americans in the country with a diversity of over 240 nations represented. According to 2010 Census Data, there are 66,443 Native American individuals living in the five counties of the San Francisco Bay Area.

As a direct result of the Indian Relocation Act of 1956, there were many Native Americans in the Bay area without resources or knowledge about the urban area. This need for resources and community is what led to the creation of the Native American Health Center in 1972 with its first location in San Francisco. This first location quickly expanded to help further meet the need of Native Americans in the Bay area.
