= Homicide =

Killing of a human by another human

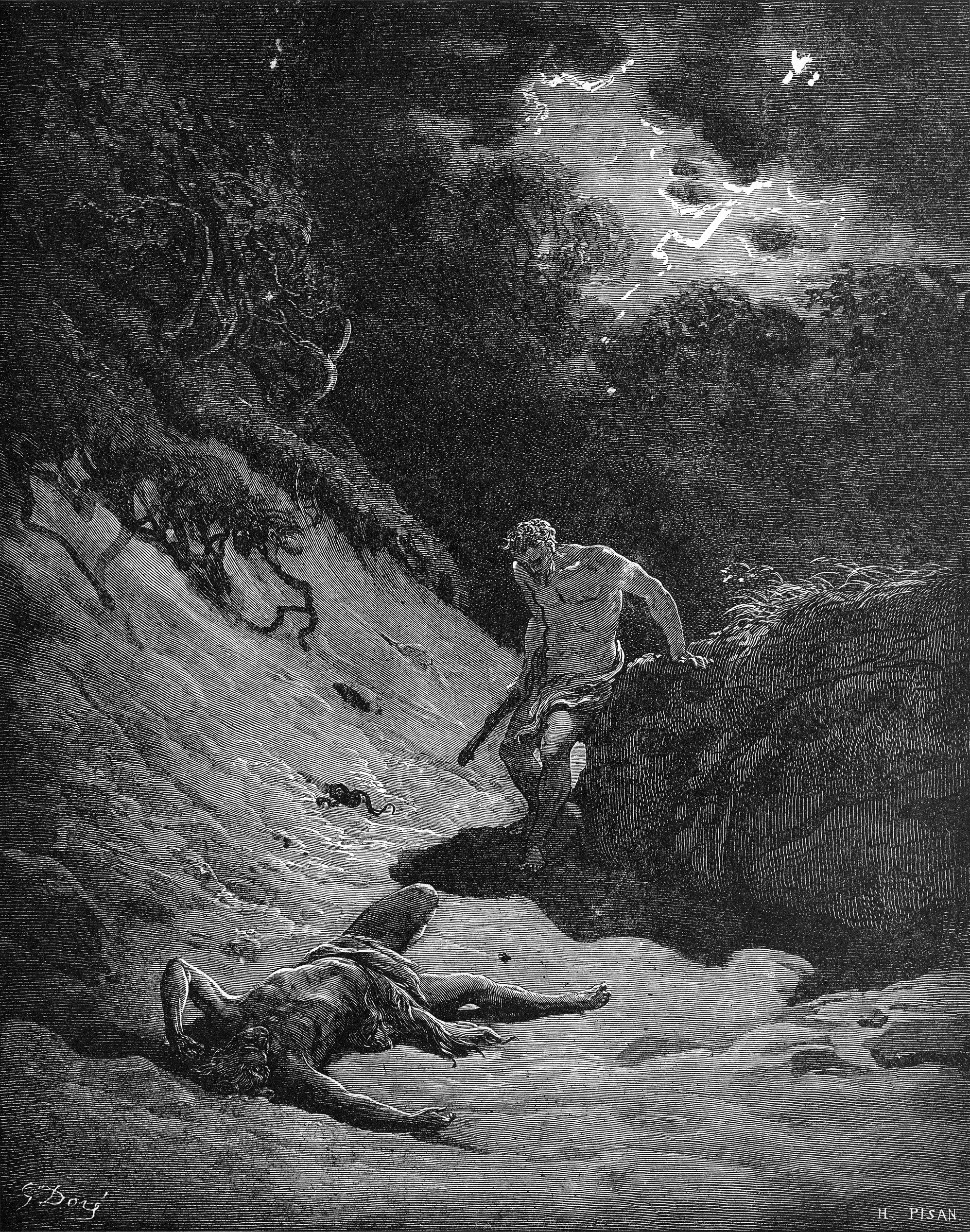
Cain Slays Abel by Gustave Doré

Homicide is an act in which a person causes the death of another person. A homicide requires only a volitional act, or an omission, that causes the death of another, and thus a homicide may result from accidental, reckless, or negligent acts even if there is no intent to cause harm.

Homicides can be divided into many overlapping legal categories, such as murder, manslaughter, justifiable homicide, assassination, killing in war (either following the laws of war or as a war crime), euthanasia, and capital punishment, depending on the circumstances of the death. These different types of homicides are often treated very differently in human societies; some are considered crimes, while others are permitted or even ordered by the legal system.

== Criminality ==
Criminal homicide takes many forms, including accidental killing and murder. Criminal homicide is divided into two broad categories—murder and manslaughter—based upon the state of mind and intent of the person who commits the homicide.

A report issued by the United Nations Office on Drugs and Crime in July 2019 documented that nearly 464,000 people around the world were killed in homicides in 2017, a number significantly in excess of the 89,000 killed in armed conflicts during the same period.

=== Murder ===
Murder is the most serious crime that can be charged following a homicide. In many jurisdictions, murder may be punished by life in prison or even capital punishment. Although categories of murder can vary by jurisdiction, murder charges fall under two broad categories, or degrees:

- First degree: The premeditated, unlawful, intentional killing of another person.
- Second degree: The intentional, unlawful killing of another person, but without any premeditation.

In some jurisdictions, a homicide that occurs during the commission of a dangerous crime may constitute murder, regardless of the actor's intent to commit homicide. In the United States, this is known as the felony murder rule. In simple terms, under the felony murder rule a person who commits a felony may be guilty of murder if someone dies as a result of the commission of the crime, including the victim of the felony, a bystander or a co-felon, regardless their intent—or lack thereof—to kill, and even when the death results from the actions of a co-defendant or third party who is reacting to the crime.

==== Preterintentional killing ====
The preterintentional killing occurs when a person, with actions aimed at hitting or harming, unintentionally causes the death of a person: the agent will be liable for objective responsibility (or fault, for the laws that require it) for the death event.

=== Manslaughter ===
Manslaughter is a form of homicide in which the person who commits the homicide either does not intend to kill the victim, or kills the victim as the result of circumstances that would cause a reasonable person to become emotionally or mentally disturbed to the point of potentially losing control of their actions. The distinction between murder and manslaughter is sometimes said to have first been made by the ancient Athenian lawmaker Draco in the 7th century BC. The penalty for manslaughter is normally less than the penalty for murder. The two broad categories of manslaughter are:

- Voluntary manslaughter: the intentional, unpremeditated killing of another person as the result of a disturbed state of mind, or heat of passion.
- Involuntary manslaughter: the unintentional killing of another person through an act of recklessness that shows indifference to the lives and safety of others, or an act of negligence that could reasonably be foreseen to result in death. The act that results in death may be intentional, such as pushing somebody in anger, but their death (such as by their subsequently falling, striking their head, and suffering a lethal head injury) is not.

Another form of manslaughter in some jurisdictions is constructive manslaughter, which may be charged if a person causes a death without intention but as the result of violating an important safety law or regulation.

=== Lawful excuse ===
Not all homicides are crimes, or subject to criminal prosecution. Some are legally privileged, meaning that they are not criminal acts at all. Others may occur under circumstances that provide the defendant with a full or partial defense to criminal prosecution. Common defenses include:

- Self-defense: while most homicides by civilians are criminally prosecutable, a right of self-defense (often including the right to defend others) is widely recognized, including, in dire circumstances, the use of deadly force.
- Mental incapacity: A defendant may attempt to prove that they are not criminally responsible for a homicide due to a mental disorder. In some jurisdictions, mentally incompetent killers may be involuntarily committed in lieu of criminal trial. Mental health and development are often taken into account during sentencing. For example, in the United States, the death penalty cannot be applied to convicted murderers with intellectual disabilities.
- Defense of infancy – Small children are not held criminally liable before the age of criminal responsibility. A juvenile court may handle defendants above this age but below the legal age of majority, though because homicide is a serious crime some older minors are charged in an adult justice system. Age is sometimes also taken into account during sentencing even if the perpetrator is old enough to have criminal responsibility.
- Justifiable homicide or privilege: Due to the circumstances, although a homicide occurs, the act of killing is not unlawful. For example, a killing on the battlefield during war is normally lawful, or a police officer may shoot a dangerous suspect in order to protect the officer's own life or the lives and safety of others.

The availability of defenses to a criminal charge following a homicide may affect the homicide rate. For example, it has been suggested that the availability of "stand your ground" defense has resulted in an increase in the homicide rate in U.S. jurisdictions that recognize the defense, including Florida.

== By state actors ==
Homicides committed by state actors may be considered lawful or unlawful according to:

- Municipal law
- International law to which the state has agreed to via treaty
- Peremptory norms which are de facto enforced as obligatory on all states, such as prohibitions against genocide, piracy and slavery

Types of state killings include:

- Capital punishment, where a judicial system of a state authorizes the death penalty as punishments for certain crime, though many countries have abolished it completely
- Lawful killings during war, such as the killing of enemy combatants
- Lawful use of deadly force by security forces (such as law enforcement officers or military personnel) to maintain public safety in emergency situations
- Extrajudicial killings, where state actors kill people (typically individuals or small groups) without judicial court proceedings
- War crimes that involve killing (war crimes not authorized by the state may also be committed by individuals who are then subject to domestic military justice)
- Widespread, systematic killing of a particular group of people by the state, which depending on the target, could be called genocide, politicide or classicide. In some cases these events may also meet the definition of a crime against humanity.

The term mass killing has been proposed by genocide scholars as a concept to define certain large-scale killings of non-combatants by state actors. Some medium- and large-scale mass killings by state actors have been termed massacres, though not all such killings have been so named. The term "democide" was coined by American political scientist Rudolph Rummel to describe "murder by government" in general, which included both extrajudicial killings and widespread systematic acts of homicide. Killings committed by state actors might be called "murder" or "mass murder" in general usage, especially if seen by the commentator as unethical, but the domestic legal definitions of murder, manslaughter, etc., usually exclude killings carried out by lawful government action.

Dartmouth College professor Benjamin Valentino outlines two major categories of mass killings: dispossessive mass killing and coercive mass killing. The first category includes four subcategories: communist, fascist, ethnic and territorial mass killings, while second category includes counterinsurgency, terrorist and imperialist mass killings. Valentino included several prominent examples of dispossessive mass killing to include his arguments, including the Holodomor, Great Leap Forward and Cambodian genocide for communist mass killings, the White Terror, the Holocaust and Dirty War for fascist mass killings, the Armenian and Rwandan genocides for ethnic mass killings and the American Indian Wars and Herero and Nama genocide for territorial mass killings. He also included examples of coercive mass killings, including counterinsurgency killings during the Algerian War and Soviet–Afghan War, terrorist mass killings such as strategic bombing during World War II and the blockade of Biafra, and German and Japanese imperialism during World War II as examples of imperialist mass killings.

== Rates ==
=== Global ===
A map of countries by their intentional homicide rate per 100,000 people. Latest available year up to year on map. From Our World in Data. Data: United Nations Office on Drugs and Crime.

National homicide rates are generally lower in high-income countries.

The countries with the most homicides per unit population, 2021. Countries with high rates are generally those with small populations (shown by very narrow rectangles).

A 2011 study by the United Nations Office on Drugs and Crime brought together a wide variety of data sources to create a worldwide picture of trends and developments. Sources included multiple agencies and field offices of the United Nations, the World Health Organization, and national and international sources from 207 countries.

The report estimated that in 2010, the total number of homicides globally was 468,000. More than a third (36%) occurred in Africa, 31 percent in the Americas, 27 percent in Asia, five percent in Europe and one percent in Oceania. Since 1995, the homicide rate has been falling in Europe, North America, and Asia, but has risen to a near "crisis point" in Central America and the Caribbean. Of all homicides worldwide, 82 percent of the victims were men, and 18 percent were women. On a per-capita scaled level, "the homicide rate in Africa and the Americas (at 17 and 16 per 100,000 population, respectively) is more than double the global average (6.9 per 100,000), whereas in Asia, Europe and Oceania (between 3 and 4 per 100,000) it is roughly half".

In its 2013 global report, UNODC estimated the total number of homicides worldwide had dropped to 437,000 in 2012. The Americas accounted for 36 percent of all homicides globally, Africa 21 percent, Asia 38 percent, Europe five percent and Oceania 0.3%. The world's average homicide rate stood at 6.2 per 100,000 population in 2012, but the Southern Africa region and Central America had intentional homicide rates four times higher than the world average. They were the most violent regions globally, outside of regions experiencing wars and religious or sociopolitical terrorism. Asia exclusive of West Asia and Central Asia, Western Europe, Northern Europe, as well as Oceania had the lowest homicide rates in the world. About 41 percent of the homicides worldwide occurred in 2012 with the use of guns, 24 percent by stabbing with sharp objects such as knife, and 35 percent by other means such as poison. The global conviction rate for the crime of intentional homicide in 2012 was 43 percent.

The 2011 Global Study on Homicide reported that "[W]here homicide rates are high and firearms and organized crime in the form of drug trafficking play a substantial role, 1 in 50 men aged 20 will be murdered before they reach the age of 31. At the other, the probability of such an occurrence is up to 400 times lower. [H]omicide is much more common in countries with low levels of human development, high levels of income inequality and weak rule of law than in more equitable societies, where socioeconomic stability seems to be something of an antidote to homicide. In cases of intimate partner and family-related homicide cases, women murdered by their past or present male partner make up the vast majority of homicide victims worldwide."

=== Historic European ===
Estimated homicide rates in Europe	Deaths per year per 100,000 population
13th–14th centuries	32
15th century	41
16th century	19
17th century	11
18th century	3.2
19th century	2.6
20th century	1.4

In the mid-second millennium, local levels of violence in Europe were extremely high by the standards of modern developed countries. Typically, small groups of people would battle their neighbors using the farm tools at hand, such as knives, sickles, hammers, and axes. Mayhem and death were deliberate. The vast majority of Europeans lived in rural areas till 1800. Cities were few, and small in size, but their concentration of population was conducive to violence and their trends resembled those in rural areas. Across Europe, homicide trends show a steady long-term decline. Regional differences were small, except that Italy's decline was later and slower. From about 1200 AD through 1800 AD, homicide rates from violent local episodes, not including military actions, declined by a factor of ten, from approximately 32 deaths per 100,000 people to 3.2 per 100,000. In the 20th century, the homicide rate fell to 1.4 per 100,000. Police forces seldom existed outside the cities; prisons only became common after 1800. Before then, harsh penalties were imposed for homicide (severe whipping or execution) but they proved ineffective at controlling or reducing the insults to honor that precipitated most of the violence. The long-term decline over centuries does not correlate with economics or measures of state control. Most historians attribute the trend in homicides to a steady increase in self-control of the sort promoted by Protestantism, and necessitated by schools and factories. Eisner argues that macro-level indicators for societal efforts to promote civility, self-discipline, and long-sightedness are strongly associated with fluctuations in homicide rates over the past six centuries. At the same time, Eisner (following the institutional legitimacy theory of Gary LaFree elaborated on the US data) suggests that changes in political legitimacy and generalized trust in institutions can explain a big proportion of short-term variations in homicide dynamics.

=== United States ===
Homicide rates by U.S. state per 100,000 residents

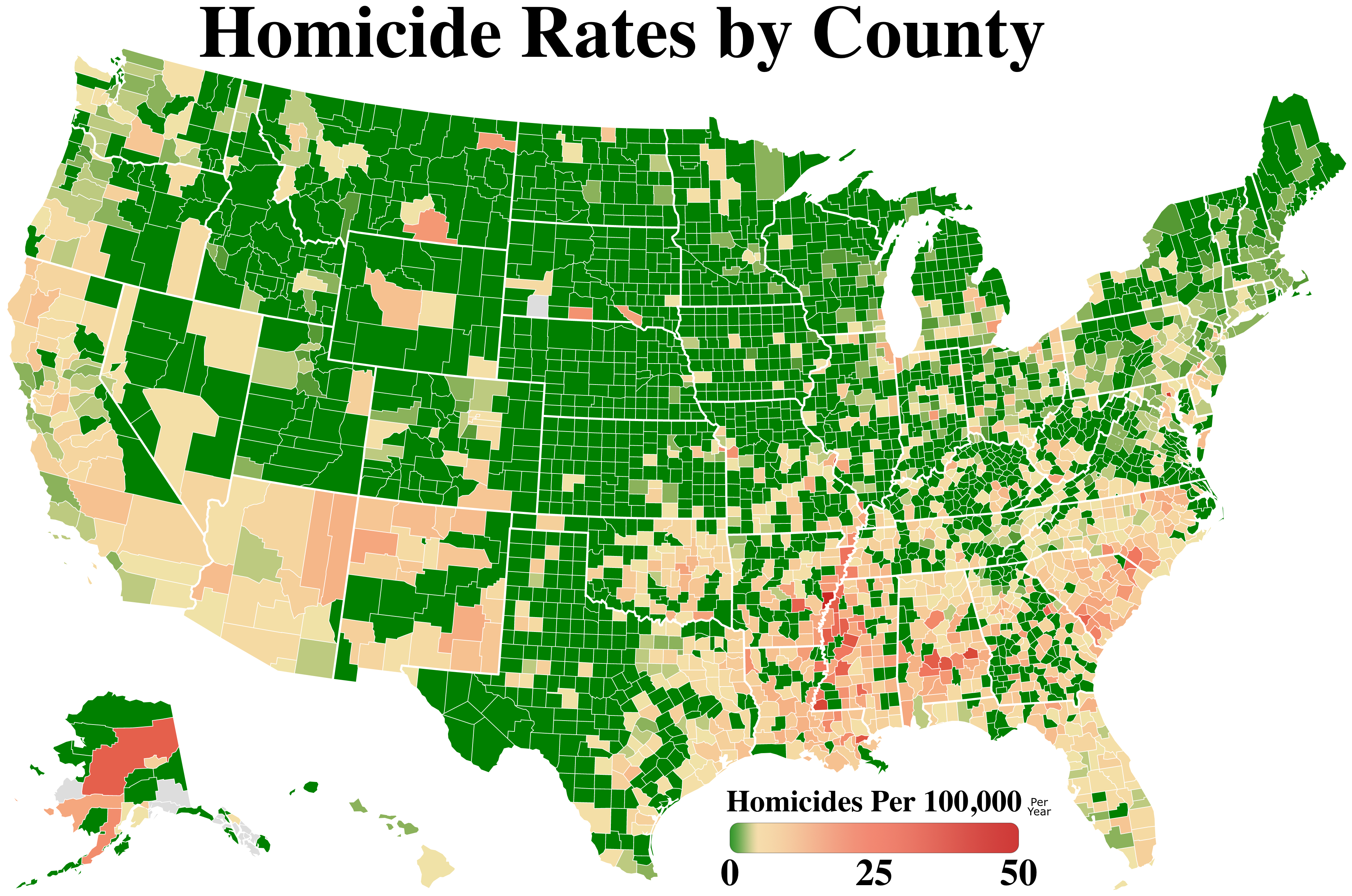
Homicide rate by county

Since 1900, US homicide rates have varied by a factor of more than 2.

Among 15 high-income countries, the U.S. has both the highest homicide rate, and the largest number of homicides.

Fetal homicide laws in the United States "Homicide" or "murder" Other crime against fetus Depends on age of fetus Assaulting mother No law on feticide

In the US, the National Violent Death Reporting System is a centralized database of relevant information from death certificates, coroner and medical examiner records, and law enforcement reports, which emerged from the National Violent Injury Statistics System. This public health surveillance tool began collecting data in 2003 and is analyzed by the National Center for Injury Prevention and Control at the CDC to provide nationally representative data.

In 2020, there were 18,439 cases of single homicide (28.6% of all violent deaths) in the 48 states and DC, a rate of 6.7 per 100,000 inhabitants. There were 695 cases of multiple homicide (1%) and 571 cases (<1%) of homicide followed by suicide with an overall homicide rate of 7.5 per 100,000 population. The weapons most commonly used in homicides were firearms, used in 76.7% of homicides overall; followed by a sharp instrument (9%); a blunt instrument (3%); personal weapons (e.g., hands, feet, or fists; 2.5%); and hanging, strangulation, or suffocation (1.5%). Among all homicide victims, a house or apartment was the most common location of homicide (41%); followed by a street or highway (22%); a motor vehicle (10%); and a parking lot, public garage, or public transport (4.5%). Precipitating circumstances were identified in 69% of homicides. One-third of homicides with known circumstances were precipitated by an argument or conflict (34%), and 15% of homicides with known circumstances were related to intimate partner violence. Homicides also were commonly precipitated by another crime (23%); in 66% of those cases, the crime was in progress at the time of the incident like assault or homicide (38.9%), robbery (32.9%), drug trade (14.5%), burglary (11%), motor vehicle theft (5%), rape or sexual assault (2%). A larger proportion of homicides of females than males resulted from caregiver abuse or neglect (9.0% versus 2.7%) or were perpetrated by a suspect with a mental health problem (e.g., schizophrenia or other psychotic conditions, depression, or posttraumatic stress disorder) (6.3% versus 1.7%). Homicide rates are known to be higher in males and in communities with concentrated poverty, stressed economies, residential instability, neighborhood disorganization, low community cohesion, and informal controls. The overall firearm homicide rate in 2020 was higher than in the last 20 years, disproportionately borne by Native Americans and Black persons. It is thought that the COVID-19 pandemic increased social and economic stress.

== See also ==
- Homicide clearance rate
- Homicide in world cities
- List of cities by homicide rate
- List of countries with annual rates and counts for killings by law enforcement officers
- List of types of killing
- List of U.S. states and territories by intentional homicide rate
