= Trade item =

Item that is the subject of trade

A trade item is an item that is the subject of trade. It is a term used primarily by people in supply chain management and logistic engineering. An often used term in the Journals of the Lewis and Clark Expedition.

== See also ==
- Goods
