= Anastasia M. Shkilnyk =

German-born Ukrainian-Canadian anthropologist

- Born: Anastasia Maria Shkilnyk; August 22, 1945; Wassenberg, Rhine Province, Germany
- Died: May 13, 2014 (aged 68)
- Education: University of Toronto; Yale University; Massachusetts Institute of Technology (PhD)
- Occupation: Anthropologist

Anastasia Maria Shkilnyk (August 22, 1945 – May 13, 2014) was a German-born Ukrainian-Canadian anthropologist.

== Life ==
Anastasia Shkilnyk was born in a Displaced Persons camp near Wassenberg on August 22, 1945. She was the daughter of Ukrainian judge Mikhialo Shkilnyk and Maria Salamon. At the age of two the family moved to Winnipeg. Shkilnyk studied Eastern European studies at the University of Toronto, graduating in 1966. She then gained a Masters at Yale University and a PhD in Urban Planning from Massachusetts Institute of Technology.

Shkilnyk's doctoral thesis was published as A Poison Stronger Than Love (1985). It documented the mercury poisoning of the Grassy Narrows community, and the resultant social disintegration of the community.

== Death ==
Shkilnyk died on 13 May 2014 from oesophageal cancer.

== Works ==
- A Poison Stronger Than Love: The Destruction of an Ojibwa Community, 1985
