= Larry Echo Hawk =

Attorney and legal scholar

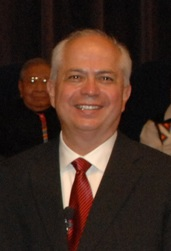
- Echo Hawk in 2009

11th Assistant Secretary of the Interior for Indian Affairs
- In office May 22, 2009 – April 27, 2012
- President: Barack Obama
- Preceded by: Carl Artman
- Succeeded by: Kevin Washburn

30th Attorney General of Idaho
- In office January 7, 1991 – January 2, 1995
- Governor: Cecil Andrus
- Preceded by: Jim Jones
- Succeeded by: Al Lance

Member of the Idaho House of Representatives from the Bannock County district
- In office 1982–1986

Personal details
- Born: August 2, 1948 (age 78) Cody, Wyoming, U.S.
- Citizenship: American; Pawnee Nation
- Party: Democratic
- Spouse: Terry Echo Hawk
- Children: 6
- Education: Brigham Young University (BS); University of Utah (JD); Stanford University (MBA)

Military service
- Branch/service: United States Marine Corps

Larry J. Echo Hawk (born August 2, 1948) is an Pawnee attorney, legal scholar, and politician. A member of the Democratic Party, Echo Hawk served under U.S. President Barack Obama as the United States assistant secretary of the interior for Indian affairs from 2009 to 2012. He previously served as the attorney general of Idaho from 1991 to 1995, the first Native American elected to the position, and spent two terms in the Idaho House of Representatives. In 2012, he was called as a general authority of the Church of Jesus Christ of Latter-day Saints (LDS Church). As of 2026, Echo Hawk is the last Democrat to have served as attorney general of Idaho.

== Early life and education ==
Echo Hawk was born into the federally recognized Pawnee Nation in Cody, Wyoming, in 1948 to Ernest and Emma Jane Echo Hawk, where his father worked with the oil and gas industry. He is enrolled as a member of the tribe, whose reservation is in Oklahoma. Before Echo Hawk started first grade, his family moved to Farmington, New Mexico. His family joined the LDS Church when he was 14.

Echo Hawk attended Brigham Young University on a football scholarship. After earning a degree in physical education and zoology, Echo Hawk served for two years in the United States Marine Corps.

He earned his JD in 1973 from the University of Utah. He then earned an MBA from the Stanford Graduate School of Business.

== Career ==
Echo Hawk began his legal career working with California Indian Legal Services. In 1975, he started his own law practice in Salt Lake City, Utah. In 1977, he became general legal counsel for the Fort Hall, Idaho-based Shoshone-Bannock Tribes. He also served as a special prosecutor for the Navajo Nation in 1985.

He later settled in Idaho, becoming active in the Democratic Party. In 1982 Echo Hawk was elected to a seat in the Idaho House of Representatives from Bannock County, where he served two terms. He was later elected Bannock County prosecuting attorney in 1986. Echo Hawk was elected attorney general of Idaho in 1990, the first Native American elected to this position in Idaho.

Echo Hawk served as national co-chair for Native Americans for the Bill Clinton 1992 presidential campaign. He was a principal speaker at that year's Democratic National Convention and led the Idaho delegation as chair at the convention.

In 1994 Echo Hawk announced his candidacy to succeed fellow Democrat Cecil D. Andrus, who was retiring as Governor of Idaho. Echo Hawk decisively defeated former state senator Ron Beitelspacher and an unknown candidate in the Democratic primary, fueling speculation that he could be the nation's first Native American governor. But, he was defeated in the general election by the Republican candidate, former Lieutenant Governor Phil Batt. Echo Hawk has not been a candidate for public office since.

Shortly after the 1994 election defeat, Echo Hawk accepted a faculty position at BYU's J. Reuben Clark Law School and returned to Utah. In that capacity he taught courses in criminal law, criminal procedure and federal Indian law. He has also published several scholarly papers.

Echo Hawk is admitted to the bar in Idaho, Utah and California.

=== Native American issues ===
Echo Hawk has served on the American Indian Services National Advisory Board and Board of Trustees. He was appointed by President Bill Clinton to the Coordinating Council on Juvenile Justice, a leading group on justice policy development. He has also served on the board of the American Indian Community Resource Center. John Echo Hawk, director of the Native American Rights Fund, is his brother.

Echo Hawk was appointed by President Obama as the assistant secretary of the interior for Indian affairs in 2009. During his tenure, the government increased the amount of land held in trust for federally recognized Native American tribes by 158,000 acres, supporting their efforts to be self-supportive and to reconnect fragmented reservations. He also oversaw several water agreements made with Native American tribes. He directed implementation of the Tribal Law and Order Act. While leading Indian Affairs, he oversaw the formation of the Tribal Leadership Conference, which provides for an annual meeting between leaders or other representatives of the 566 federally recognized tribes, the U.S. president and all members of the Cabinet. He resigned his position at Interior on April 27, 2012.

In February 2019, Echo Hawk joined the administration of Utah governor Gary Herbert as special counsel on Native American affairs.

=== LDS Church service ===
Larry J. Echo Hawk

First Quorum of the Seventy
- March 31, 2012 – October 6, 2018
- Called by: Thomas S. Monson
- End reason: Designated emeritus General Authority

Emeritus General Authority
- October 6, 2018
- Called by: Russell M. Nelson

In the LDS Church, Echo Hawk has served as president of a student stake on the BYU campus, a bishop, and high councilor.

At the time he was elected attorney general of Idaho, he was serving as a member of the board of trustees of LDS Social Services.

He was accepted by church membership as a general authority and member of the First Quorum of the Seventy on March 31, 2012. During his first year as a general authority he made multiple trips throughout the southwest US, often meeting with groups of Latter-day Saint Native Americans. From 2013 to 2015, Echo Hawk served as second counselor in the presidency of the church's Philippines Area. From 2015 to 2018, Echo Hawk served as an assistant executive director of the church's Correlation Department. He was also a member of the LDS Church's Boundary and Leadership Change Committee. On October 6, 2018, Echo Hawk was released and designated an emeritus general authority.

== Personal life ==
Echo Hawk married Teresa "Terry" Pries in 1968 in the Salt Lake Temple; their sealing was performed by Spencer W. Kimball, then a member of the Quorum of the Twelve Apostles. The couple have six children.

Legal offices
Preceded by Jim Jones	Attorney General of Idaho; 1991–1995	Succeeded by Al Lance
Party political offices
Preceded by Cecil Andrus	Democratic nominee for Governor of Idaho; 1994	Succeeded by Robert Huntley
Political offices
Preceded by Carl Artman	Assistant Secretary of the Interior for Indian Affairs; 2009–2012	Succeeded by Del Laverdure; Acting
