= Laverdure =

Laverdure is a surname. Notable people with the surname include:

- Brittanee Laverdure (born 1982), Canadian wrestler
- Claude Laverdure (diplomat), Canadian diplomat
- Claude Laverdure (author) (1947–2020), Belgian comic book author
- Donald Laverdure, American judge and politician
- René Laverdure (1862–1914), French army officer
