= Elouise P. Cobell =

Blackfoot tribal elder, activist, banker, and rancher

Elouise Pepion Cobell
- Yellow Bird Woman, Elouise Pepion

(Blackfoot Confederacy) elder and activist leader

Personal details
- Born: November 5, 1945
- Died: October 16, 2011 (aged 65) Great Falls, Montana
- Spouse: Alvin Cobell
- Relations: Eight brothers and sisters; great-granddaughter of Mountain Chief
- Children: Turk Cobell
- Education: Great Falls Business College, Montana State University
- Known for: Lead plaintiff in Cobell v. Salazar; banker, Treasurer of the Blackfeet Tribe
- Awards: Presidential Medal of Freedom (2016, posthumous)

Elouise Pepion Cobell, also known as Yellow Bird Woman (November 5, 1945 – October 16, 2011) (Niitsítapi Blackfoot Confederacy), was a tribal elder and activist, banker, rancher, and lead plaintiff in the groundbreaking class-action suit Cobell v. Salazar (2009). This challenged the United States' mismanagement of trust funds belonging to more than 500,000 individual Native Americans. She pursued the suit from 1996, challenging the government to account for fees from resource leases.

In 2010, the government approved a $3.4 billion settlement for the trust case. Major portions of the settlement were to partially compensate individual account holders, and to buy back fractionated land interests, and restore land to reservations. It also provided for a $60 million scholarship fund for Native Americans and Alaskan Natives, named the Cobell Education Scholarship Fund in her honor. The settlement is the largest ever in a class action against the federal government.

As of March 24, 2017, the full $60 million had been contributed to the scholarship fund by the government, from its purchase of lands. The scholarships continue, administered by the non-profit Indigenous Education Inc. Buy-back of lands came to an end November 2022, restoring acreage to the tribes. It paid $1.69 billion for 1.1 million fractionated land interests, totalling about 3 million acres, restoring the land base of reservations to tribal control.

In November 2016, Cobell's work on behalf of Native Americans was honored by the award of a posthumous Presidential Medal of Freedom by President Barack Obama; her son Turk Cobell accepted the award on her behalf.

== Biography ==
Elouise Pépion was born in 1945 on the Blackfeet Reservation in Montana, the middle of nine children of Polite and Catherine Pépion. She was a great-granddaughter of Mountain Chief, one of the legendary leaders of the Blackfeet Nation. She grew up on her parents' cattle ranch on the reservation. Like many reservation families, they did not have electricity or running water. Pépion attended a one-room schoolhouse until high school. She graduated from Great Falls Business College and attended Montana State University. She had to leave before graduation to care for her mother, who was dying of cancer.

After her mother's death, Elouise moved to Seattle, where she met and married Alvin Cobell, another Blackfeet living in Washington at the time. They had one son, Turk Cobell. After returning to the reservation to help her father with the family ranch, Elouise Cobell became treasurer for the Blackfeet Nation.

She founded the Blackfeet National Bank, the first national bank located on an Indian reservation and owned by a Native American tribe. In 1997, Cobell won a MacArthur genius award for her work on the bank and Native financial literacy. She donated part of that money to support her class-action suit against the federal government because of its mismanagement of trust funds and leasing fees, which she had filed in 1996. (See below: Challenging federal management of trust funds)

After twenty other tribes joined the bank to form the Native American Bank, Cobell became Executive Director of the Native American Community Development Corporation, its non-profit affiliate. The Native American Bank is based in Denver, Colorado.

Her professional, civic experience and expertise included serving as Co-Chair of Native American Bank, NA.; a Board Member for First Interstate Bank; a Trustee of the National Museum of the American Indian; as well as a member of other boards.

Throughout her life, Cobell also helped her husband to operate their ranch, raising cattle and crops. Cobell was active in local agriculture and environmental issues. She founded the first land trust in Indian Country and served as a Trustee for the Nature Conservancy of Montana.

Cobell died at the age of 65 on October 16, 2011, in Great Falls, Montana, after a brief battle with cancer.

Cobell was the former president of Montana's Elvis Presley fan club, but left these activities to focus on her landmark lawsuit. In her honor, all car radios during her funeral procession were tuned to Elvis songs. Her family arranged to have at the viewing a pair of life-size Elvis cutouts standing against the rear wall. A photo of Cobell and her family at Graceland flashed occasionally in the rotating display on a big screen overhead. The buffet featured a giant cake, decorated with the words, "In Loving Memory of Elouise Cobell", and a picture of Elvis.

== Challenging federal management of trust funds ==
While Treasurer of the Blackfeet Tribe for more than a decade, Cobell discovered many irregularities in the management of funds held in trust by the United States for the tribe and for individual Indians. These funds were derived from fees collected by the government for Indian trust lands leased for lumber, oil production, grazing, gas and minerals, etc., from which the government was supposed to pay royalties to Indian owners. Over time accounts became complicated as original trust lands were divided among descendants, and Cobell found that tribal members were not receiving their fair amount of trust funds.

Along with the Intertribal Monitoring Association (on which she served as President), Cobell attempted to seek reform in Washington, DC, from the mid-1980s to the mid-1990s without success. At that point she asked Dennis Gingold (renowned banking lawyer, based in Washington, DC), Thaddeus Holt, and the Native American Rights Fund (including John Echohawk and Keith Harper) to bring a class-action suit against the Department of Interior in order to force reform and an accounting of the trust funds belonging to individual Indians.

They set up the Blackfeet Reservation Development Fund, "a nonprofit created to bring claims against the United States for mismanaging lands held in trust for Native Americans." The Lannan Foundation, which "provides financial assistance to tribes and nonprofits that serve Native American communities", has said that it gave more than $7 million in grants to the Blackfeet fund from 1998 to 2009 to support the litigation, in the expectation that the grants would be repaid in full after settlement. In 2013, in a suit filed in Washington, the Lannan Foundation said it was still seeking payment from Gingold, the lead counsel in the case, and had received only $1.8 million.

== Settlement ==
The class-action suit was filed in October 1996 and is known as Cobell v. Salazar (Salazar was Secretary of Interior when the case was settled.) A negotiated settlement was reached in 2009 by the administration of President Barack Obama. In 2010 Congress passed a bill to appropriate $3.4 billion for settlement of the longstanding class action suit. It had three parts: payment of individual plaintiffs included in the class action; a fund of $1.9 billion to buy back fractionated land interest in voluntary sales, and restore land to reservations, strengthening their land base. It also provided for a $60 million scholarship fund to be funded from the sales, named the Cobell Education Scholarship Fund in her honor.

As of July 2011, notices were being sent to the hundreds of thousands of individual Native Americans affected. Most received settlements of about $1800, but some may receive more. As of November 2016, the government had spent about $900 million to buy back the equivalent of 1.7 million acres in fractionated land interests, restoring the land base of reservations to tribal control. In addition, $40 million has been added so far to the Cobell Scholarship Fund.

In 2009, when settlement was reached with the government, Cobell said:

Although we have reached a settlement totaling more than $3.4 billion, there is little doubt this is significantly less than the full accounting to which individual Indians are entitled. Yes, we could prolong our struggle and fight longer, and perhaps one day we would know, down to the penny, how much individual Indians are owed. Perhaps we could even litigate long enough to increase the settlement amount. But we are compelled to settle now by the sobering realization that our class grows smaller each year, each month and every day, as our elders die and are forever prevented from receiving their just compensation.

== Representation in other media ==
Producer and director Melinda Janko made 100 Years: One Woman's Fight for Justice (2016), a 75-minute documentary on the life and achievements of Cobell. It was screened at the Santa Fe Independent Film Festival in October 2016.

== Legacy and honors ==
- 1997: "Genius Grant" from the John D. and Catherine T. MacArthur Foundation's Fellowship Program
- 2002: Awarded an honorary doctorate from Montana State University
- 2002: received the International Women's Forum award for "Women Who Make a Difference", in Mexico City.
- 2004: Jay Silverheels Achievement Award from the National Center for American Indian Enterprise Development.
- 2005: received a "Cultural Freedom Fellowship" from the Lannan Foundation, an award that cited Cobell's persistence in bringing to light the government's "more than a century of government malfeasance and dishonesty" with the Indian Trust.
- 2007: one of ten people to receive American Association of Retired Persons (AARP) Impact Award (for making the world a better place)
- 2007: named one of the inaugural Rural Heroes by the National Rural Assembly.
- 2011: awarded an honorary degree of Doctor of Humane Letters from Dartmouth College
- 2011: awarded the Montana Trial Lawyers Association's Citizens Award
- 2016: awarded a posthumous Presidential Medal of Freedom by President Barack Obama. Her son Turk Cobell accepted the medal on her behalf.
- 2018: one of the inductees in the first induction ceremony held by the National Native American Hall of Fame
