= Indian self-determination =

Indian self-determination can refer to

- Native American self-determination in the United States
- Attempts at self-determination during British rule in India, such as the Government of India Act 1919, Government of India Act 1935 and the idea that India could achieve Swaraj within the British Empire
