= Kevin K. Washburn =

Native American legal scholar from Oklahoma, U.S.

Kevin Washburn
- Washburn in 2010

Dean of the University of Iowa College of Law
- In office March 2018 – December 31, 2024
- Preceded by: Gail Agrawal
- Succeeded by: Todd Pettys (Interim)

12th Assistant Secretary of the Interior for Indian Affairs
- In office October 9, 2012 – January 1, 2016
- President: Barack Obama
- Preceded by: Larry Echo Hawk
- Succeeded by: Tara Sweeney

Dean of the University of New Mexico School of Law
- In office 2009–2012
- Preceded by: Leo Romero (Acting)
- Succeeded by: Barbara Bergman (Acting)

Personal details
- Born: August 9, 1967 (age 58)
- Party: Democratic
- Spouse: Libby Washburn
- Education: University of Oklahoma (BA); Washington University; Yale University (JD)

Kevin K. Washburn (born 1967) is a Chickasaw law professor and former dean of the University of New Mexico School of Law, and the University of Iowa College of Law. He served in the administration of President Barack Obama as Assistant Secretary for Indian Affairs at the U.S. Department of the Interior from 2012 to 2016. Washburn has also been a federal prosecutor, a trial attorney at the U.S. Department of Justice, and the General Counsel of the National Indian Gaming Commission. Washburn is a citizen of the Chickasaw Nation, a federally recognized Native American tribe.

== Early life and education ==
Kevin Washburn was born on August 9, 1967. His mother, Shirley Stark (née Wallace), raised him in Oklahoma City and small towns in Oklahoma, including Purcell, Heavener, and Ada. He graduated from Moore High School, in Moore, Oklahoma, a suburb of Oklahoma City. Washburn came from an underprivileged background. Washburn discussed his childhood and mother in a speech given upon receiving the Spirit of Excellence Award from the American Bar Association. His mother, who was single for much of his childhood, raised him and his two siblings. She eventually retired as a community health representative for the Chickasaw Nation and currently serves on the tribe's Council of Elders. Washburn went to college at the University of Oklahoma, where he majored in economics and minored in philosophy. After graduating with honors in 1989, Washburn began law school at Washington University in St. Louis where he was the inaugural Gustavus A. Buder Scholar. After his first year of law school, Washburn transferred to the Yale Law School, where he served as editor-in-chief of the Yale Journal on Regulation and received his J.D. degree in 1993.

== Career ==
Washburn began his legal career by clerking for Judge William C. Canby Jr., of the U.S. Court of Appeals for the Ninth Circuit, a scholar in the field of Native American Law, former law professor, and author of American Indian Law in a Nutshell.

Washburn was hired through the Attorney General's Honors Program as a trial attorney at the United States Department of Justice Environment and Natural Resources Division. During his tenure there, Washburn successfully argued Montana v. EPA, in which the U.S. Court of Appeals for the Ninth Circuit upheld the decision of the Environmental Protection Agency to recognize the Salish and Kootenai Tribes as a state for purposes of setting water quality standards under the Clean Water Act. He also helped the Las Vegas Paiute Native American Tribe obtain water rights for a major development on the Snow Mountain Reservation, located northwest of Las Vegas, Nevada.

From 1997 to 2000 Washburn served as an Assistant United States Attorney in New Mexico. Working in the Violent Crimes Section, he handled homicides, sexual assault, bank robberies, and various other offenses, many of them arising in Native American country. His highest profile case was the successful prosecution of an offender who made threats against United States District Court Judge John E. Conway and United States Magistrate Judge Robert DeGiacomo.

=== National Indian Gaming Commission ===
From 2000 to 2002, Washburn served as the third General Counsel of the National Indian Gaming Commission. He served during the time of tremendous growth in the Native American gaming industry in California as that gaming became authorized by the signing of tribal-state gaming compacts, a very active time at the commission. As general counsel, Washburn made several reforms. First, on hearing complaints from the industry suggesting that agency staff were abusing power in the management contract review process by demanding changes to contracts that were not required by law, Washburn changed the review process by requiring staff to identify statutory or regulatory authority for any objection that agency staff made to a proposed management contract under review. Second, Washburn improved the commission's enforcement efforts by working to make the commission's document charging a regulatory violation, called a "notice of violation," more comprehensible to the public. Washburn required that such notices be written to explain the purpose for the rule which the target was accused of violating. The use of such "speaking indictments" clarified the reasons that the NIGC was taking action and therefore improved public understanding of the NIGC enforcement priorities. Washburn also aggressively defended the independence of the commission as an independent regulatory agency, strongly resisting efforts by officials of the Department of the Interior to embroil the NIGC in the longstanding Cobell class action litigation that ultimately was settled as Cobell v. Salazar. Third, Washburn helped the NIGC establish, over the strong objections of the Department of Justice, the right of tribal nations to conduct Class II gaming with technological aids that helped maintain a strong revenue source for tribes and gave them more leverage in negotiations with states over revenue sharing.

=== University of Minnesota Law School, 2002-2009 ===
Washburn began his academic career as a professor in 2002 at the University of Minnesota Law School, where he earned tenure in 2006. He spent the academic year of 2007–08 as the Oneida Nation Distinguished Visiting professor of Native American Law at Harvard Law School. In 2008, he joined the law faculty at the University of Arizona James E. Rogers College of Law, where he was the Rosenstiel Distinguished Professor of Law. Washburn has also taught short courses at the University of Montana School of Law and the University of Nebraska College of Law.

Much of Washburn's scholarship focuses on the intersection of federal Native American law and criminal law. In one of his articles, he focuses on the federal criminal justice system that applies on Native American reservations and the federal constitutional values of criminal procedure. In another piece, Washburn writes about the federalized criminal justice system and federal Native American policy involving Native American self-determination. His groundbreaking work in this field was discussed at length in a piece in the High Country News. In July 2008, Senator Byron Dorgan introduced S. 3320: Tribal Law and Order Act of 2008 in an attempt to fix some of the problems identified in Washburn's scholarship. The Tribal Law and Order Act was signed into law in 2010.

=== University of New Mexico School of Law, 2009-2012 ===
In 2009, Washburn was named dean of the University of New Mexico School of Law from 2009 to 2012. In 2010, the School of Law celebrated the 60th anniversary of its first graduating class with a celebration attended by more than 800 people and the release of a book entitled "60 for 60: Shaping Law in New Mexico Since 1950" which documented the law school community's influence in New Mexico. The 60 for 60 event was reflective of Dean Washburn's efforts to connect the law school with the broader community. Washburn's tenure was marked by the successful recruitment of several high-value faculty members to the law school, in part, by raising all faculty salaries during a time of shrinking fiscal resources. These recruits included George Bach, Cannon, Max Minzner, Aliza Organick, Dawinder "Dave" Sidhu, Kevin Tu and Alex Ritchie. Washburn hired Ritchie to establish the law school's "oil & gas program", to provide more opportunity for communities and students from the San Juan and Permian Basin regions to engage better with the school. During Washburn's tenure, U.S. Supreme Court Justices Elena Kagan and Sonia Sotomayor visited the School of Law, and Ninth Circuit Judge Mary Murguia gave the inaugural Senator Dennis Chavez Memorial Lecture. The Chavez Lecture was established, during Washburn's deanship, through a gift from the Senator's family. Washburn helped to bring numerous other significant gifts to the law school to support students and faculty, such as the Daniels Diploma, the Salazar Prize, the Bailey Scholarship in Law, and the Hart Chair. Under Washburn's leadership, annual giving to the School of Law also increased dramatically. Washburn helped strengthen the relationship with the New Mexico courts, especially the Court of Appeals, which relocated to a new building next door to the School of Law during Washburn's deanship.

The UNM School of Law's curricular offerings expanded during Washburn's tenure. In addition to the oil & gas program, the School of Law developed a semester in Washington D.C. program, spearheaded by then-Associate Dean Barbara Bergman, as well as an Innocence and Justice Project program designed to use DNA evidence to free the wrongfully convicted, funded by a significant grant from the U.S. Department of Justice obtained by then-Associate Dean April Land. Washburn also obtained a grant from then-Governor Bill Richardson to fund a DWI-DV Prosecution-in-Practice class in which students prosecute cases of domestic violence and driving while intoxicated.

=== Obama Administration, 2012-2016 ===
Washburn left the UNM deanship in the fall of 2012, when President Barack Obama appointed him to serve as Assistant Secretary for Indian Affairs at the U.S. Department of the Interior. Following a confirmation hearing, he was confirmed unanimously by the United States Senate on September 21, 2012, and was sworn into office by Secretary of the Interior Ken Salazar on October 9, 2012, serving in that position until January 1, 2016, when he returned to the University of New Mexico as a faculty member. He was the twelfth Assistant Secretary of the Interior for Indian Affairs to be confirmed since the position was established by Congress in the late 1970s. He was preceded by Larry Echo Hawk and succeeded by Lawrence S. Roberts (acting). In addition to carrying out the department's trust responsibilities regarding the management of tribal and individual Native American trust lands and assets, the Assistant Secretary is responsible for promoting the self-determination and economic self-sufficiency of the nation's 567 federally recognized Native American and Alaska Native tribes and their approximately two million enrolled members. As Assistant Secretary, Washburn helped organize the White House Tribal Nations Conferences for 2012, 2013, 2014, and 2015, in which President Obama invited leaders from each Native American tribe to Washington, D.C., to meet with the President directly and with his cabinet. Washburn also oversaw the establishment of the White House Council of Native American Affairs by President Obama.

Washburn's leadership at the Department of the Interior was marked by significant policy accomplishments, such as initiatives designed to preempt state taxation of business activity in Native American country to enhance tribal economic development, a reversal of the department's rule against taking land in trust for Alaska tribes, more than half a million acres of new lands taken into trust for tribes, and more than 1.5 million acres of fractionated interests in existing trust lands restored to tribes.

Washburn also worked to reform and improve numerous BIA regulatory regimes, related to rights-of-way, Native American child welfare, the federal acknowledgment process for Native American tribes, tribal jurisdiction, and Secretarial elections. Washburn described his philosophy at a lecture at UCLA in 2014.

Early in Washburn's tenure, Congress imposed a sequestration on the federal government, cutting five percent from each agency's budget. Nevertheless, under Washburn's leadership, Washburn worked with Congressional appropriators and President Obama's Office of Management and Budget to increase funding for the Indian Affairs programs at the U.S. Department of the Interior, resulting in an increase in appropriations from $2.3 billion in FY 2013 to $2.8 billion in FY 2016, a half-billion increase in less than four years, increasing the federal government's success in meeting its trust responsibilities to Native American nations. The last budget on which he worked before leaving government services sought $2.9 billion in funding for these programs.

Washburn also helped the United States achieve settlements with Native American tribes in cases against the United States for breach of contracts and breach of trust, including a $940 million settlement in the Ramah Navajo Chapter class action and a $554 million settlement with the Navajo Nation.

Washburn's aggressive initiatives to advance Native American tribal nations was appreciated by tribal leaders for which Washburn received frequent praise, but his advocacy met a backlash among conservatives in Congress, producing an often contentious relationship with some members, particularly in the House. Washburn criticized House members for placing the legitimacy of some tribes in doubt and opposing the Obama administration's land-into-trust initiatives. Washburn also sometimes clashed with Senators, including Senator John McCain. During his tenure in office, Washburn was responsible, working with the Office of Federal Acknowledgement, for extending federal recognition to the Pamunkey Tribe of Virginia, the tribe of Pocahantas.

Washburn attributed the successes on initiatives for Native American tribes during President Obama's second term to having an extraordinarily strong and hard-working political team in place in the Office of the Assistant Secretary, pursuing President Obama's Native American Country agenda, including the Principal Deputy Assistant Secretary Larry Roberts, Deputy Assistant Secretary Ann Marie Bledsoe Downes, Chiefs of Staff Sarah Walters and Sarah Harris, Rodina Cave, Cheryl Andrews Maltais, Kallie Hanley, Don Yu, Jonodev Chaudhuri, Kathryn Isom Clause and Sequoyah Simermeyer. During Washburn's tenure, Morgan Rodman was named the first executive director of the White House Council on Native American Affairs, which was chaired by Secretary of the Interior Sally Jewell, staffed by other members of the Cabinet, and housed within the Office of the Assistant Secretary.

In January 2016, Washburn returned to a faculty position at the University of New Mexico School of Law. Washburn's tenure as Assistant Secretary was more than three years and three months, making him the longest-serving official in that position at that time since Ada Deer left the position in 1997, and one of the longest in the history of the position.

=== University of Iowa College of Law - 2018-2025 ===
In March 2018, Washburn was named Dean of the University of Iowa College of Law. He served in that role until the end of 2024.

Washburn served as dean during the COVID-19 pandemic and through the protests and national reckoning that occurred in the aftermath of the murder of George Floyd. He was responsible for a number of significant faculty hires, and resumed the Iowa LAw Faculty Fellows faculty-pipeline program. His vision for the Iowa law school was to become the "Writing Law School" and he hired additional faculty to support that effort and developed the law school's Writing and Academic Success Center. That effort helped the law school land an extraordinary number of judicial law clerks including one year when every member of the Iowa Supreme Court had an Iowa law grad as a clerk and several recent graduates were clerking on federal circuit courts.

Washburn also helped develop the Hubbell Environmental Initiative and helped the law school earn membership in The Foundation for Natural Resources and Energy Law.

Washburn's tenure was marked by strong student recruiting, bringing in the most academically qualified and diverse classes in the law school's history. To support student success, he hired the law school's first fill-time embedded mental health counselor and also oversaw the development of an outstanding bar passage program.

During his time as dean, Washburn served a two-year term as the chairman of the Board of Trustees of the Law School Admission Council. In November 2020, Washburn was named as captain of the Joe Biden presidential transition Agency Review Team to support transition efforts related to the United States Department of the Interior. He took partial leave from the College of Law to serve in that role and served until the administration took office on January 20, 2021. Later, he served a three-year term on the executive committee of the Association of American Law Schools.

Washburn announced his planned retirement from the deanship of the UIowa College of Law at the end of 2024. Washburn later announced that he would be joining the law faculty of the University of California, Berkeley, effective in the fall of 2025.

== Personal life ==
Washburn is married to Libby Washburn, who served as the University of New Mexico chief of staff.

== Gaming law ==
Washburn is one of the country's leading experts on gaming and gambling law. He served as the general counsel of the National Indian Gaming Commission (NIGC) from January 2000 to July 2002. He is the author of a law school casebook on Gaming Law and Regulation published by Aspen Publishers in 2011, and several law review articles.Washburn's scholarship includes articles addressing the regulatory process related to Native American gaming and the cultural clashes among federal agencies with regulatory roles in Native American gaming. While visiting at Harvard Law School during the 2007–08 academic year, Professor Washburn taught the first course on Gaming/Gambling Law in that school's history. In addition to Harvard, Professor Washburn has taught Gaming/Gambling Law at the University of Minnesota Law School, the University of Arizona James E. Rogers College of Law, and the University of New Mexico School of Law. His work has been cited by the U.S. Supreme Court and U.S. Courts of the Appeals for the Seventh Circuit and the Ninth Circuit, among other courts. Washburn has also testified frequently before Congress on issues related to gaming.

== Federal Native American law ==
Washburn is also an expert in federal Native American law. He has been an author of one of the principal casebooks on federal Native American law, entitled American Indian Law: Native Nations and the Federal System. He is also an author/editor of Indian Law Stories, a book that provides the back stories of several key Native American law cases. In addition, he is an author and member of the executive board of editors of Felix Cohen's Handbook of Federal Indian Law, the leading treatise in the field of federal Native American law. In 2017, the Harvard Law Review published online Washburn's reflections on the future of federal Native American law and policy.

== Affiliations ==
Elected member of the American Law Institute since 2007; Board of Trustees of the Law School Admission Council from 2006 to 2009, 2012, and 2016 to 2022, and chairman of the board from 2019 to 2021); Author and Executive Editor of Felix Cohen's Handbook of Federal Indian Law since 2005 and Co-Editor-in-Chief, with Nell Jessup Newton, of the 2024 edition of the Handbook; Member of the Criminal Law and Procedure Drafting Committee for the National Conference of Bar Examiners 2006–2012 and 2016–2018; Yale Law School Fund Board of Directors 1998–2004; Board of Directors of the Conservation Lands Foundation 2017–2020; American Academy of Arts and Science since 2025. Member of the ABA Accreditation Committee, 2017–2019. Enrolled member of the Chickasaw Nation of Oklahoma, a federally recognized Native American nation. Washburn won the American Bar Association Spirit of Excellence Award in 2015. Washburn was inducted into the Chickasaw Hall of Fame in 2017.

== See also ==
- Bureau of Indian Affairs
- University of New Mexico School of Law
- University of Iowa College of Law
