= John S. Lowe =

- Education: Denison University (BA); Harvard Law School (LLB)

John S. Lowe is the George W. Hutchison Professor of Energy Law and former Senior Associate Dean for Academic Affairs at the Southern Methodist University's Dedman School of Law. He specializes in energy law.

== Biography ==
Lowe received his B.A. in 1963 from Denison University and his LL.B. in 1966 from Harvard University. He was a Maxwell Fellow in Malawi from 1966 to 1969.

Lowe practiced law in Columbus, Ohio from 1970 to 1975.

He was assistant professor, and later associate professor, at the University of Toledo from 1975 to 1978. He was professor and associate director of the National Energy Law and Policy Institute at the University of Tulsa, starting in 1978. In 1987, he became professor at Southern Methodist University, where he has since taught courses on oil and gas law and oil and gas contract law.

He also has been a visiting professor at several universities around the world, including at the University of Texas, the University of Denver, the University of Dundee, the University of New Mexico, the University of Melbourne, the University of Sydney, and the University of Alberta.

== Scholarly work and impact ==
Lowe's research has made a significant impact in energy law. He is the author of Oil and Gas Law in a Nutshell (6th ed. 2014). He is the co-author of three law school textbooks, International Petroleum Transactions (3d ed. Rocky Mt. Min. L. Fdn. 2010), Cases and Materials on Oil and Gas Law (6th ed. West 2013) and Hemingway's Hornbook on Oil and Gas Law and Taxation (5th ed. West 2017). He has written dozens of articles in scholarly journals, including the Rocky Mountain Mineral Law Institute.

Lowe has been President of the Rocky Mountain Mineral Law Foundation and Chair of the American Bar Association's Section of Environment, Energy, and Resources. He may be the only academic to have held both posts.

He holds a named-chair appointment at the Dedman School of Law at Southern Methodist University, a major institution of higher education and research. The SMU School of Law is consistently ranked in the 40-50 range for the nation's top law schools in the U.S. News & World Report.
