= Native American Housing Assistance and Self-Determination Act of 1996 =

United States law

Native American Housing and Self-Determination Act of 1996
- Long title: An act to provide Federal assistance for Indian tribes in a manner that recognizes the right of tribal self-governance, and for other purposes.
- Acronyms (colloquial): NAHASDA
- Enacted by: the 104th United States Congress
- Effective: September 1, 1997

Citations
- Public law: Public Law 104–330
- Statutes at Large: 110 Stat. 4016

Codification
- Acts amended: Housing Act of 1937

Legislative history
- Introduced in the House as H.R. 3219 by Rick Lazio (R–NY) on March 29, 1996; Committee consideration by House Committee on Banking and Financial Services, Subcommittee on Housing and Community Opportunity; Passed the House on September 28, 1996 (voice vote); Passed the Senate on October 3, 1996 (unanimous consent); Signed into law by President Bill Clinton on October 26, 1996

Major amendments
- Public Law 106–569

United States Supreme Court cases
- Arakaki v. Lingle (2002)

The Native American Housing Assistance and Self-Determination Act of 1996 (NAHASDA) simplifies and reorganizes the system of providing housing assistance to federally recognized Native American tribes to help improve their housing and other infrastructure. It reduced the regulatory strictures that burdened tribes and essentially provided for block grants so that they could apply funds to building or renovating housing as they saw fit. This was in line with other federal programs that recognized the sovereignty of tribes and allowed them to manage the funds according to their own priorities. A new program division was established at the Department of Housing and Urban Development (HUD) that combined several previous programs into one block grant program committed to the goal of tribal housing. The legislation has been reauthorized and amended several times since its passage.

== History ==
NAHASDA was one result of the broader historic campaign in the 20th century for Native American self-determination and the tribes regaining sovereignty.

Prior to NAHASDA, housing assistance for Native American tribes and Alaska Natives was provided by several different programs under the Housing Act of 1937 and other related, succeeding legislation. These programs included assistance for Indian housing development, public housing projects, child development, rental assistance, youth program assistance, and housing assistance for the homeless.

The programs greatly increased the quantity and quality of housing on Indian lands, but they had a variety of regulatory requirements, including separate application for grants and differing standards for eligibility; they required different obligations from the tribes. In addition, under these programs, public housing assistance on Indian reservations was considered an extension of other housing programs, and did not recognize the unique cultural and infrastructure needs of Native American communities, which were usually located in rural areas. Roger Biles describes how "The clustered housing prescribed for rental units clashed with the traditional living patterns of many Indians and, according to some IHA officials, resulted in the creation or exacerbation of problems previously rare in Native American populations such as gangs, violence, and drug and alcohol abuse." These issues caused friction between HUD administrators and tribal leaders. A series of investigations in the 1990s also uncovered instances of corruption, fraud, and mismanagement.

Although the tribes had relied on federal housing assistance programs for decades, the programs were cumbersome to implement and many of their people on reservations still suffered from inadequate housing and homelessness, some resulting from the widespread poverty due to lack of jobs on reservations. As these issues were studied, tribal leaders, advocates, and elected officials such as Rep. Bill Richardson (D-NM), began calling for the promotion of "a creative new approach that encourages tribes to take control of their own futures [that] would also get them out from under the [Bureau of Indian Affairs]." This was part of a late 20th-century movement stressing increased sovereignty and self-determination of tribes in many areas of self-government.

On June 26, 1994, HUD released a new American Indian and Alaska Native policy statement, emphasizing its intent to strengthen the unique government-to-government relationship between the U.S. and federally recognized Native American tribes and Alaska Native villages by encompassing Indian affairs as part of their sphere of responsibility. Traditionally, issues concerning Native Americans had been addressed by the Bureau of Indian Affairs and the U.S. Department of the Interior; the policy statement sought to expand HUD's mission to include a special responsibility to Indian tribes.

The memorandum was the basis for the Native American Housing Assistance and Self-Determination Act (NAHASDA), which established grant and support programs specifically for the use of American Indian and Alaska Native groups.

The development of the Native American Housing Assistance and Self-Determination Act (NAHASDA) was a bipartisan initiative led by Chris Boesen, legislative aide to Congressman Rick Lazio (R), NY), and Dominic Nessi, Deputy Assistant Secretary for the Office of Native American Programs (ONAP) within the U.S. Department of Housing and Urban Development (HUD) during the Clinton administration.

The primary authors of the legislative language were Ed Fagan, a program analyst at ONAP who had substantial experience in drafting legislative proposals on a variety of Native American issues and Chris Boesen. Legal drafting support was provided by Paul Callen, who worked in close coordination with the drafting team. The ONAP’s involvement in crafting the legislation occurred outside the standard HUD departmental legislative process.

The drafting team was deliberately kept small, and much of the work was carried out confidentially. One external advisor, Robert Gauthier of the Salish-Kootenai Housing Authority—a prominent housing advocate within HUD’s Denver region and the Chairperson of the National Commission on American Indian, Alaska Native and Native Hawaiian Housing — was regularly consulted on the proposed legislation by Mr. Nessi.

While ONAP staff were chiefly responsible for preparing the legislative text, Boesen played the central role in guiding the bill through the congressional process in both the House and Senate.

Broader tribal input was not widely solicited during the development phase in order to streamline the effort. As a result, the authors intentionally structured the legislation to be broad and flexible, avoiding detailed prescriptive requirements. Key details, including the formula for distributing NAHASDA funds to tribes and tribal housing entities was deferred to post-enactment, as well as establishing a Negotiated Rulemaking process, allowing a large contingent of tribal representatives to contribute to the regulatory framework following the Act’s passage.

NAHASDA was introduced in the U.S. House of Representatives by Rep. Rick Lazio (R-NY) on March 29, 1996 as H.R. 3219.

In his remarks, Rep. Lazio said,

Tribal governments and housing authorities should also have the ability and responsibility to strategically plan their own communities' development, focusing on the long-term health of the community and the results of their work, not over burdened by excessive regulation. Providing the maximum amount of flexibility in the use of housing dollars, within strict accountability standards, is not only a further affirmation of the self-determination of tribes, it allows for innovation and local problem-solving capabilities that are crucial to the success of any community-based strategy.

On September 28, 1996, Rep. Lazio moved to suspend the House rules and pass the bill as amended; the bill was agreed to by voice vote without objections. The bill then moved on to the U.S. Senate, where it was swiftly passed by unanimous consent on October 3. On October 26, 1996, U.S. President Bill Clinton officially signed NAHASDA into public law.

== Summary of the Act ==
NAHASDA was designed to recognize the unique relationship and history of the United States and the sovereign American Indian nations. It was intended to address the need of affordable housing on tribal lands for low income people and families as part of the federal government's responsibility to promote the general well being of the country:

(6) the need for affordable homes in safe and healthy environments on Indian reservations, in Indian communities, and in Native Alaskan villages is acute and the Federal Government should work not only to provide housing assistance, but also, to the extent practicable, to assist in the development of private housing finance mechanisms on Indian lands to achieve the goals of economic self-sufficiency and self-determination for tribes and their members; and (7) Federal assistance to meet these responsibilities should be provided in a manner that recognizes the right of Indian self-determination and tribal self-governance by making such assistance available directly to the Indian tribes or tribally designated entities under authorities similar to those accorded Indian tribes in Public Law 93–638 (25 U.S.C. 450 et seq.).

The act is separated into seven sections:

- Title I: Block Grants and Grant Requirements
- Title II: Affordable Housing Activities
- Title III: Allocation of Grant Amount
- Title IV: Compliance, Audits, and Reports
- Title V: Termination of Assistance for Indian Tribes Under Incorporated Programs
- Title VI: Federal Guarantees for Financing for Tribal Housing Activities
- Title VII: Other Housing Assistance for Native Americans

The act simplified the system of providing housing assistance to Native American communities by consolidating the myriad programs previously available to tribal groups into a single grant program known as the Indian Housing Block Grant (IHBG). Title VI of the act also authorized loans and loan guarantee programs to help American Indian tribes finance their development projects.

NAHASDA created a transition from funding and regulation under the Housing Act of 1937, so that all grants awarded under the previous legislation were renewable only if in compliance with the new law. This new act was designed specifically to assist in the development of housing, housing services, housing management services, and crime prevention and safety activities in Indian communities. These actions are meant to align with the objectives of assisting and promoting affordable housing on tribal land, offering tribal members better access to private mortgage markets, matching development to surrounding areas, and promoting private capital markets Indian Country.

To receive grants through this program both a one- and a five-year plan are required to be submitted by the tribes. They must include a mission statement, list of goals and objectives, an activities plan, a statement of needs, financial resources, and of affordable housing resources, and a certification of compliance. Once funds have been awarded, grantees must meet a standard of wages, comply with the National Environmental Policy Act of 1969, keep rents at or below 30% of the resident's monthly adjusted income, set eligibility requirements for admission, and secure a management group that efficiently maintains and operates the units.

Any profits made from the development of the affordable housing must be used by the tribe for further development of similar housing operated under NAHASDA. Funds may also be invested, but annual reports and audits are required to ensure that grant money is being used to invest in the promotion of self-sufficiency and housing in Indian communities. The tribes submit yearly reports along with the government's review. The amount of outstanding obligations for NAHASDA can not exceed $2,000,000,000. If a recipient fails to meet the requirements and abide by the regulations, the recipient can be replaced by another applicant. The initial allocation of funds is decided by a formula used to determine need. When first administered in 1997, this amount could not be less than any funds received during the fiscal year of 1996.

Included in the legislation are tenant rights to notification of eviction and just cause for eviction, applicable to all housing funded through the Act. Another stipulation for future projects aligns with the Public and Assisted Housing Drug Elimination Act of 1990, and drug activity is a valid cause for eviction.

=== Assistance to Native Hawaiians ===
An amendment to the act in 2000 added Title VIII, which authorizes loans for housing and infrastructure purposes by Native Hawaiians. The authorization prompted some non-indigenous Hawaiians to file suit against the Office of Hawaiian Affairs (OHA) in the case Arakaki v. Lingle. The plaintiffs claimed that the authorization of HUD grant money for sole use of indigenous people was in violation of the equal protection clause of the 14th Amendment. On April 16, 2007, the District Court ruled in favor of the OHA, claiming that the authorization of grants to the OHA did not constitute any harm to the plaintiffs. This set a precedent for the constitutionality of the government's supplying funds to Native groups for them to use as they see fit.

== Implementation and impact ==
Made effective September 1, 1997, NAHASDA distributed $550 million in grants of its allocated $592 million within its first year; 97 percent of tribal housing entities met the first housing plan submission deadline of July 1, 1998. NAHASDA doubled the number of tribes receiving grants, compared to the previous collection of HUD grants it replaced. The number of housing units developed or planned by Native Americans per year was tripled compared to the yearly average during the lifetime of the 1937 Housing Act.

In keeping with the related goal of self-determination, tribes were permitted to use Indian Housing Block Grants for a wide range of purposes. For example, tribes used some grant money to rehabilitate existing housing units and construct new units. According to a Government Accountability Office (GAO) study, "During fiscal years 2003 through 2008, NAHASDA grantees collectively used IHBG funds to build 8,130 homeownership and 5,011 rental units; acquire 3,811 homeownership and 800 rental units; and rehabilitate 27,422 homeownership and 5,289 rental units". With regard to alleviating poverty and making housing more affordable for Native Americans, tribes could use grants for various housing assistance programs. For example, the same GAO study reports that "in fiscal years 2008 and 2009, approximately 50 percent of grantees used IHBG funds to provide tenant-based rental assistance; more than 50 percent used IHBG funds to provide housing or financial literacy counseling; and approximately 30 percent used IHBG funds to provide down payment assistance".

NAHASDA has contributed to improving relations between the federal and tribal governments. A GAO survey found that the act and its implementation were well regarded among Native Americans: 89.7% of respondents held positive views toward the effectiveness of NAHASDA, while less than 10% felt it was not an improvement over the previous Indian housing programs. The most highly regarded aspect of the plan was the level of discretion afforded to the tribes to determine their own needs. The act recognized that the policies HUD applied to providing public housing in poor urban neighborhoods might not be effective on rural Native American reservations. In addition, NAHASDA "simplified the [application] process for federal housing money and reduced friction with housing authorities seen in earlier programs". The widely perceived success of the program and its broad political support led to its reauthorization in 2001 and 2008. The act expired in 2013. Congress has continued to allocate funding on a year to year basis. Reauthorization bills have been introduced in every Congress since 2013 and have repeatedly failed.

== Current figures ==
Indian Country Today reported on the program in 2016:

The money is allocated to tribes based on a formula, and goes to their tribally-designated housing entities (TDHEs). The biggest allocation for 2016 is to the country's largest tribe, the Navajo Nation. The Arizona-based Navajo will receive $86.4 million in IHBG money for fiscal 2016. Other large allocations go to the Cherokee Nation of Oklahoma ($30 million), Cook Inlet Regional Corp. of Anchorage, Alaska ($6 million) and $5.9 million to the Muscogee Creek Tribe of Oklahoma.
