= Sarah Deer =

American lawyer (b 1972)

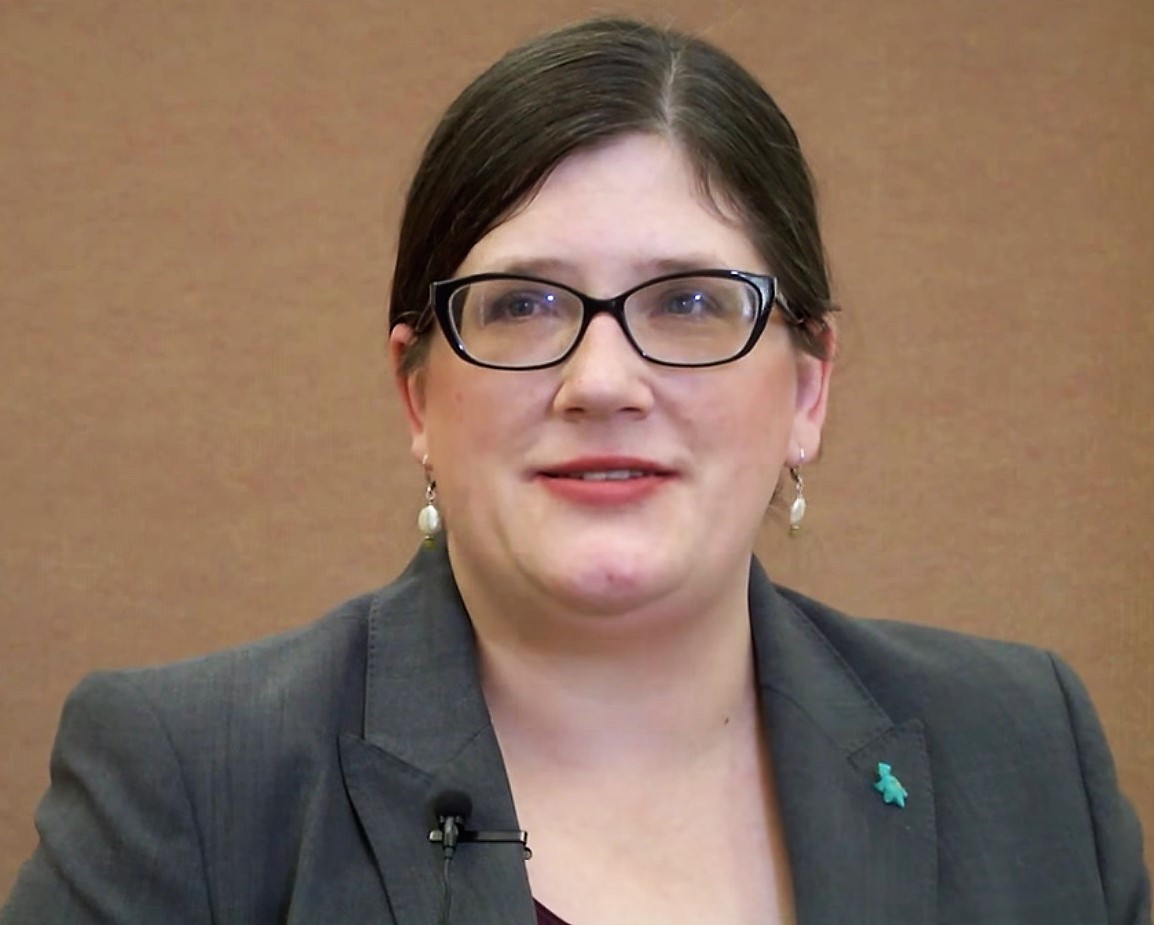
- Sarah Deer in 2016
- Born: November 9, 1972 (age 53)
- Citizenship: Muscogee (Creek) Nation
- Education: University of Kansas
- Occupations: Professor of Public Affairs and Administration and Women, Gender, and Sexuality Studies
- Known for: Tribal Law and Order Act of 2010
- Awards: MacArthur fellow

Sarah Deer (born November 9, 1972) is a Native American lawyer from the Muscogee (Creek) Nation of Oklahoma. She is a "University Distinguished Professor" of Indigenous Studies, Women, Gender, and Sexuality Studies, and Public Affairs and Administration at the University of Kansas, where she also received her B.A. and J.D. Deer began her efforts of 25+ years supporting Native sexual assault victims while volunteering as a rape crisis advocate during her undergraduate degree, unfolded in her most recent book, The Beginning and End of Rape: Confronting Sexual Violence in Native America (2015). She was a 2014 MacArthur fellow and has been inducted into the National Women's Hall of Fame in 2019.

== Career ==
Deer advocates on behalf of survivors of sexual assault and domestic violence, primarily within Native American communities. She has been credited for her "instrumental role" in the 2013 reauthorization of the Violence Against Women Act, which "recognizes that the inherent right of tribal nations includes criminal jurisdiction over non-Indian defendants accused of domestic violence", a long fought for provision. Deer coauthored, with Bonnie Claremont, Amnesty International's 2007 report Maze of Injustice, documenting sexual assault against Native American women, which supported her testimony that is credited in the passage of the Tribal Law and Order Act in 2010. She has served on the Prairie Island Indian Community Court of Appeals since 2013 and been Chief Justice since 2016. Since 2015, she has also served as an appellate judge for the White Earth Nation.

Deer advocates for feminist, queer, and trans politics in Indigenous communities. She is most acknowledged for her activism to stop violence against Native American women. She has received many national awards, including the Allied Professional Award and Crime Victim Service Award from the U.S. Department of Justice in 2011, the Spirit of Excellence Award from the American Bar Association in 2016, and is in both the Mvskoke (Creek) Nation Hall of Fame (2015) and National Women’s Hall of Fame (2019) for her accomplishments. In 2020, she was chosen as both a Andrew Carnegie Fellow and the Honorary Doctorate Recipient of Humane Letters from Brooklyn College.

Most recently, Deer has been working on Indigenous feminist legal theory (IFLT), working to restructure the current law systems built under colonial, patriarchal, racist boundaries.

== Bibliography ==
=== Books ===
- Deer, Sarah (2015). The Beginning and End of Rape : Confronting Sexual Violence in Native America. University of Minnesota Press. p. 207. ISBN 978-0816696338.
- Tatum, Melissa L.; Jorgensen, Miriam; Guss, Mary E.; Deer, Sarah (2014). Structuring Sovereignty: Constitutions of Native Nations. UCLA American Indian Studies Center. p. 210. ISBN 978-0935626681.
- Deer, Sarah; Garrow, Carrie E. (2004-10-30). Tribal Criminal Law and Procedure. Rowman Altamira. p. 496. ISBN 9780759115200.
- Richland, Justin Blake; Deer, Sarah (2010). Introduction to Tribal Legal Studies. Rowman & Littlefield. p. 482. ISBN 9780759112117.
- Deer, Sarah; Clairmont, Bonnie; Martell, Carrie A. (2008). Sharing our Stories of Survival: Native Women Surviving Violence. Rowman Altamira. p. 362. ISBN 978-0759111257.

=== Articles ===
- Deer, Sarah, Feminist Jurisprudence in Tribal Courts: An Untapped Opportunity (2023). Yale Journal of Law and Feminism, Vol. 34, No. 2, p. 80–87.
- Deer, Sarah, (En) gendering Indian law: Indigenous feminist legal theory in the United States (2019). Yale Journal of Law and Feminism, Vol. 31, No.1, p. 1–34.
- Deer, Sarah; Warner, Elizabeth Ann Kronk, Raping Indian Country"(2019). Columbia Journal of Gender and Law, Vol. 38, No. 1, p. 31–95.
- Deer, Sarah, NATIVE PEOPLE AND VIOLENT CRIME: Gendered Violence and Tribal Jurisdiction (2018). Du Bois Review: Social Science Research on Race, Vol. 15, No. 1, p. 89–106.
- Deer, Sarah, Bystander No More? Improving the Federal Response to Sexual Violence in Indian Country (2017-08-01). Utah Law Review, Vol. 2017, No. 4, Article 7.
- Deer, Sarah; Murphy, Liz, "Animals May Take Pity on Us": Using Traditional Tribal Beliefs to Address Animal Abuse and Family Violence Within Tribal Nations (2017-01-01). Mitchell Hamline Law Review, Vol. 43, No. 4.
- Farley, Melissa et al., The prostitution and trafficking of American Indian/Alaska Native women in Minnesota (2016). American Indian and Alaska Native Mental Health Research, Vol. 23, No.1, p. 65-104.
- Woolman, Joanna; Deer, Sarah, Protecting Native Mothers and Their Children: A Feminist Lawyering Approach (2014-01-01). William Mitchell Law Review, Vol. 40, No. 3.
- Deer, Sarah; Knapp, Cecilia, Muscogee Constitutional Jurisprudence: Vhakv Em Pvtakv (The Carpet Under the Law) (2013-01-01). Tulsa Law Review, Vol. 49, No.1, p. 125–181.
- Deer, Sarah; Jacobson, John, Dakota Tribal Courts in Minnesota: Benchmarks of Self-Determination (2013-01-01). William Mitchell Law Review, Vol. 39, No. 2.
- Deer, Sarah, Relocation Revisited: Sex Trafficking of Native Women in the United States (2010-01-01). Faculty Scholarship, 157.
- Deer, Sarah, Decolonizing Rape Law: A Native Feminist Synthesis of Safety and Sovereignty (2009). Wicazo Sa Review, Vol. 24, No. 2, p. 149–167.
- Deer, Sarah, Sovereignty of the Soul: Exploring the Intersection of Rape Law Reform and Federal Indian Law (2005). Suffolk University Law Review, Vol. 38, p. 455.
- Martell, Carrie; Deer, Sarah, Heeding the Voice of Native Women: Toward an Ethic of Decolonization (2005-01-01). North Dakota Law Review, Vol. 81, No. 4, p. 807–822.
- Deer, Sarah, Toward an Indigenous Jurisprudence of Rape (2010-10-13). Kansas Journal of Law & Public Policy, Vol. 14, 2004–2005.
- Deer, Sarah, Federal Indian Law and Violent Crime: Native Women and Children at the Mercy of the State (2004). Social Justice, Vol. 31, No. 4, p. 17–30.
- Deer, Sarah; Tatum, Melissa, Tribal Efforts to Comply with VAWA's Full Faith and Credit Requirements: A Response to Sandra Schmieder (2003-12-01) Tulsa Law Review, Vol. 39, No. 2, p. 403–418.
- Deer, Sarah, Expanding the Network of Safety: Tribal Protection Orders for Survivors of Sexual Assault (2003-01-01). Tribal Law Journal, Vol. 4, No.1, 2003-2004.
