= Donald Laverdure =

Acting Assistant Secretary of the Interior for Indian Affairs
- In office April 27, 2012 – October 9, 2012
- President: Barack Obama
- Preceded by: Larry Echo Hawk
- Succeeded by: Kevin K. Washburn

Personal details
- Born: Donald E. Laverdure Crow Agency, Montana
- Education: University of Arizona (B.S.); University of Wisconsin (J.D.)
- Profession: attorney

Donald "Del" Laverdure is a Crow and Chippewa attorney and political appointee who served as the Principal Deputy Assistant Secretary of Indian Affairs at the Department of the Interior and also served as the Acting Assistant Secretary, overseeing the Bureau of Indian Affairs and Bureau of Indian Education. He is also a former assistant professor of Law & Director of the American Indian Law Program at Michigan State University College of Law. He has served as Chairman of the Crow Nation Judicial Ethics Board, and Appellate Judge of the Keweenaw Bay Indian Community.

== Background ==
Donald "Del" Laverdure is an enrolled citizen of the Crow Tribe of Montana and a direct descendant of the Little Shell Band of Chippewa Indians. He was born at Crow Agency, Montana, and grew up on the Crow Indian Reservation. His mother was full-blood Crow, and his father was Ojibwe. Both fluently spoke the Crow language.

== Career ==
Laverdure has testified before the Parliament of Canada on issues such as self-governance legislation and the Crow Tribal Legislature on water rights, tobacco taxes, and tribal tax legislation. Prior to joining the Michigan State University College of faculty, Laverdure was executive director of the Great Lakes Indian Law Center at the University of Wisconsin Law School.

Laverdure served as the Chief Justice of the Crow Tribe Court of Appeals.

On April 27, 2012, upon the retirement of Larry Echo Hawk, Laverdure became the Acting Assistant Secretary, where he oversaw the Bureau of Indian Affairs, the Bureau of Indian Education and several other offices. Laverdure served in this role for almost five months until President Barack Obama 's new nominee for Assistant Secretary, Kevin K. Washburn, was confirmed by the U.S. Senate in September 2012, and took office in early October of that year.

One of Laverdure's major accomplishments in his various roles at the Department of the Interior was shepherding new leasing regulations through the regulatory reform process. Among other improvements, the new leasing regulations provided for pre-emption of state taxation of commercial activities on leased Indian lands and greater deference to tribes in the decision-making process.
