= 1990 Idaho Attorney General election =

- November 6, 1990
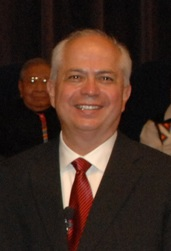

Nominee	Larry Echo Hawk	Pat Kole
Party	Democratic	Republican
Popular vote	175,000	138,822
Percentage	55.76%	44.24%
- County results Echo Hawk: 50–60% 60–70% 70–80% Kole: 50–60%
Attorney General before election
Jim Jones
Republican
Elected Attorney General
Larry Echo Hawk
Democratic

The 1990 Idaho Attorney General election was held on November 6, 1990, to elect the Idaho Attorney General. Republican incumbent Jim Jones chose not to seek a third term, instead unsuccessfully running in the Republican primary for U.S. Senate.

Former Idaho state representative Larry Echo Hawk won the election, defeating Republican Deputy Idaho Attorney General Pat Kole by eleven percentage points. As of 2026, this is the last time a Democrat was elected Idaho Attorney General.

== Republican primary ==
=== Candidates ===
- Pat Kole, Idaho Deputy Attorney General

=== Results ===
Republican primary results
Party	Candidate	Votes	%
Republican	Pat Kole	87,820	100.00%
Total votes		87,820	100.00%

== Democratic primary ==
=== Candidates ===
- Larry Echo Hawk, former Idaho state representative from the Bannock County district (1982–1986)

=== Results ===
Democratic primary results
Party	Candidate	Votes	%
Democratic	Larry Echo Hawk	45,032	100.00%
Total votes		45,032	100.00%

== General election ==
=== Candidates ===
- Larry Echo Hawk, former Idaho state representative from the Bannock County district (1982–1986) (Democratic)
- Pat Kole, Idaho Deputy Attorney General (Republican)

=== Results ===
1990 Idaho Attorney General election results
Party	Candidate	Votes	%	±%
Democratic	Larry Echo Hawk	175,000	55.76%	+55.76%
Republican	Pat Kole	138,822	44.24%	−55.76%
Total votes		313,822	100.00%	
Democratic gain from Republican				
