= Cobell v. Salazar =

American class-action lawsuit

- Court: United States District Court for the District of Columbia
- Decided: 2009

Case opinions
- Decision by: (settled)

Cobell v. Salazar (previously Cobell v. Kempthorne and Cobell v. Norton and Cobell v. Babbitt) is a class-action lawsuit brought by Elouise Cobell (Blackfeet) and other Native American representatives in 1996 against two departments of the United States government: the Department of Interior and the Department of the Treasury for mismanagement of Indian trust funds. It was settled in 2009. The plaintiffs claim that the U.S. government has incorrectly accounted for the income from Indian trust assets, which are legally owned by the Department of the Interior, but held in trust for individual Native Americans (the beneficial owners). The case was filed in the United States District Court for the District of Columbia. The original complaint asserted no claims for mismanagement of the trust assets, since such claims could only properly be asserted in the United States Court of Federal Claims.

The case is sometimes reported as the largest class-action lawsuit against the U.S. in history, but this is disputed. Plaintiffs contend that the number of class members is around 500,000, while defendants maintain it is closer to 250,000. The potential liability of the U.S. government in the case is also disputed: plaintiffs have suggested a figure as high as $176 billion, and defendants have suggested a number in the low millions, at most.

The case was settled for $3.4 billion in 2009. $1.4 billion was allocated to be paid to the plaintiffs and $2 billion allocated to repurchase fractionated land interests from those distributed under the Dawes Act and to return it to reservations and communal tribal ownership. In addition, a scholarship fund for Native American and Alaska Native students was created, to be funded from purchase of fractionated lands. It is named the Cobell Educational Scholarship Fund in honor of lead plaintiff Elouise Cobell, who filed suit against the government in 1996 and persisted with the case until settlement. The scholarship fund has a cap of $60 million; $40 million had been contributed to the fund by November 2016.

By November 2016, the Department of Interior had paid $900 million to individual landholders for the fair market value of their fractionated lands, and transferred an estimated 1.7 million acres to tribal reservations for communal use. As more reservations are participating in the program, the pace of buy back has increased.

== Early Federal Indian trust law ==
The history of the Indian trust is inseparable from the larger context of the Federal government's relationship with American Indians, and its policies as that relationship evolved. At its core, the Indian trust is an artifact of a nineteenth-century Federal policy. Its late 20th-century form bore the imprint of subsequent policy evolution.

During the late 1800s, Congress and the Executive branch believed that the best way to foster assimilation of Indians was to "introduce among the Indians the customs and pursuits of civilized life and gradually absorb them into the mass of our citizens." Under the "General Allotment Act of 1887" (the Dawes Act), communal tribal lands were divided and assigned to heads of households as individually owned parcels 40–160 acres (0.16–0.65 km^{2}) in size. The Dawes Rolls are the records of the members of each tribe who were registered by government representatives at the time. The total land area that was allotted was small compared to the amount of land that had been held communally by tribes in their reservations at the passage of the Act. The government declared Indian lands remaining after allotment as "surplus" and opened them for non-Indian settlement, resulting in the loss of millions of acres of tribal lands.

Section 5 of the Dawes Act required the United States to "hold the land thus allotted, for the period of twenty-five years, in trust for the sole use and benefit of the Indian to whom such allotment shall have been made…" During the trust period, individual accounts were to be set up for each Indian with a stake in the allotted lands, and the lands would be managed for the benefit of the individual allottees. Indians could not sell, lease, or otherwise encumber their allotted lands without government approval. Where the tribes resisted allotment, it could be imposed. After twenty-five years, the allotted lands would become subject to taxation. Many allottees did not understand the tax system, or did not have the money to pay the taxes, and lost their lands at that time.

== Fruit of a failed policy ==
The early Indian trust system evolved from a series of adjustments to a policy that was gradually abandoned, then finally repealed. The allotment regime created by the Dawes Act was not intended to be permanent. The expectation was that Native Americans would gradually assume fee simple ownership of lands over a period of 25 years, about one generation. The theory that Indians could be turned into useful subsistence farmers, working their allotted lands, was overwhelmingly unsuccessful. Much of the land they were allotted in the arid West was unsuitable for small family farms, and they were subject to abuse by speculators. Within a decade of passage of the Dawes Act, the policy began to be adjusted because of government concerns about Indian competency to manage land. As late as 1928, the overseers were extremely reluctant to grant fee patents to Indians. The Meriam Report of that year, which assessed the effects of federal policy toward Native Americans, advocated making Indian landowners undergo a probationary period to "prove" competence.

In the early 1900s, the federal government passed a series of statutes that together made the government's trusteeship of these lands a permanent arrangement. The Department of Interior's trusteeship is sometimes referred to as an "evolved trust." Little thought was given at the time to the consequences of making permanent the heirship of allotments. Lands allotted to individual Indians were passed from generation to generation, just as any other family asset passes to heirs. Probate proceedings commonly dictated that land interests be divided equally among every eligible heir unless otherwise stated in a will. As wills were not, and are not, commonly used by Indians, the size of land interests continually diminished as they were passed down from one heir to the next generation. The result was that, by the mid-20th century, an original allotted land parcel of 160 acres (0.65 km^{2}) could have more than 100 owners. While the parcel of land had not changed in size, each individual beneficiary had an undivided fractional interest in the 160 acres (0.65 km^{2}). It made it impossible to effectively use the land.

The allotment policy was formally repealed in 1934, with passage of the Indian Reorganization Act of 1934 (IRA) during the Franklin D. Roosevelt administration. This was part of an effort to encourage Native American tribes to restore their governments and control over communal lands.

== The case ==
Elouise Cobell was a banker and treasurer of the federally recognized Blackfeet Confederacy in Montana. In the late 20th century, she became increasingly concerned about evidence that the federal government had mismanaged trust accounts and failed to pay money owed to Native Americans. After efforts to lobby for reform in the 1980s and 1990s were not successful, she decided to file a class action suit.

Cobell v. Babbitt was filed on June 10, 1996. The named plaintiffs are Elouise Cobell, Earl Old Person, Mildred Cleghorn, Thomas Maulson, and James Louis Larose. The defendants are the United States Department of the Interior and the United States Department of the Treasury. According to Cobell, "the case has revealed mismanagement, ineptness, dishonesty, and delay of federal officials." The plaintiffs alleged that "the government illegally withheld more than $150 billion from Indians whose lands were taken in the 1880s to lease to oil, timber, minerals and other companies for a fee." Since inception the Indian plaintiff class was represented by attorneys Dennis M. Gingold (who left in 2012 after the settlement), Thaddeus Holt, and attorneys from the Native American Rights Fund, including Keith Harper and John EchoHawk. The Department of the Interior was represented by presidential appointees, first by Bruce Babbitt, then Gale Norton, Dirk Kempthorne, and finally Ken Salazar.

The case was assigned to Judge Royce Lamberth, who eventually became a harsh critic of the Department of Interior, making a series of sharply worded opinions.

Due to a court order (at the request of the plaintiffs) in the litigation, portions of Interior's website, including the Bureau of Indian Affairs (BIA), were shut down beginning in December 2001. The stated reason for the shutdown order was to protect the integrity of trust data in light of concerns that trust data could be accessed and manipulated by persons outside the Department. The order also prevented persons within the Department from using the Internet.

In 2002, the Department ordered the extension of the shut down to the National Indian Gaming Commission, which would have caused serious disruption of the regulation of Indian gaming because the Commission used Internet connections to conduct fingerprint checks for background investigations of persons working in the gaming industry. The NIGC strongly resisted the imposition of the shut down order and, in doing so, helped establish its status as an independent federal agency. Following a May 14, 2008, order of the D.C. District Court, BIA and other Interior bureaus and offices were reconnected to the Internet.

=== Early victories for plaintiffs ===
Cobell is at bottom an equity case, with plaintiffs contending that the Government is in breach of its trust duties to Indian beneficiaries. Plaintiffs seek relief in the form of a complete historical accounting of all Individual Indian Monies (IIM) accounts. While Cobell is technically not a money damages case – claims for money damages against the Government in excess of $10,000 must be brought in the United States Court of Federal Claims – plaintiffs contend that a complete accounting will show the IIM accounts to be misstated on the order of billions of dollars. If that contention were supported by the Court, plaintiffs would leverage such a finding to seek an adjustment of all IIM account balances.

Department of the Interior (DOI) Factual Stipulations (filed June 11, 1999)

1. [T]he Department of the Interior cannot provide all account holders with a quarterly report which provides the source of funds, and the gains and losses. [See 25 U.S.C. §4011.]
2. [T]he Department of the Interior does not adequately control the receipts and disbursements of all IIM account holders. [See id. §162a(d)(2).]
3. [T]he Department of the Interior's periodic reconciliations are insufficient to assure the accuracy of all accounts. [See id. §162a(d)(3).]
4. [A]lthough the Department of the Interior makes available to all IIM account holders the daily balance of their account and can provide periodic statements of the account balances, the Department does not provide all account holders periodic statements of their account performance. [See id. §162a(d)(5).]
5. [The] Department of the Interior does not have written policies and procedures for all trust fund management and accounting functions. [See id. §162a(d)(6).]
6. [T]he Department of the Interior does not provide adequate staffing, supervision and training for all aspects of trust fund management and accounting. [See id. § 162a(d)(7).]
7. [The Department of the Interior's] record keeping system [is inadequate]. [See id. §162a(d)(1), (3), (4),(6).]

In December 1999 the District Court for the District of Columbia found for the plaintiffs and identified five specific breaches that warranted prospective relief:

1. The Secretary of the Interior Had No Written Plan to Gather Missing Data
2. The Secretary of the Interior Had No Written Plan Addressing the Retention of IIM-Related Trust Documents Necessary to Render an Accounting
3. The Secretary of the Interior Had No Written Architecture Plan
4. The Secretary of the Interior Had No Written Plan Addressing the Staffing of Interior's Trust Management Functions
5. The Secretary of the Treasury Had Breached His Fiduciary Duty to Retain IIM-Related Trust Documents and Had No Remedial Plan to Address This Breach of Duty

This decision was upheld by Court of Appeals in February 2001.

In June 2001 Secretary of the Interior Norton issued a directive creating the Office of Historical Trust Accounting (OHTA), "to plan, organize, direct, and execute the historical accounting of Individual Indian Money Trust (IIM) accounts," as mandated by both the Court and the 1994 Act.

=== Lamberth removed ===
On July 11, 2006, the U.S. Court of Appeals for the District of Columbia Circuit, siding with the government, removed Judge Lamberth from the case – finding that Lamberth had lost his objectivity. "We conclude, reluctantly, that this is one of those rare cases in which reassignment is necessary," the judges wrote.

Lamberth, appointed to the bench by President Ronald Reagan, was known for speaking his mind. He repeatedly ruled for the Native Americans in their class-action lawsuit. His opinions condemned the government and found Interior secretaries Gale Norton and Bruce Babbitt in contempt of court for their handling of the case. The appellate court reversed Lamberth several times, including the contempt charge against Norton. After a particularly harsh opinion in 2005, in which Lamberth lambasted the Interior Department as racist, the government petitioned the Court of Appeals to remove him, saying he was too biased to continue with the case.

The Appeals Court concluded that some of Judge Lamberth's statements went too far, and "on several occasions the district court or its appointees exceeded the role of impartial arbiter." The Court wrote that Lamberth believed that racism at Interior continued and is "a dinosaur – the morally and culturally oblivious hand-me-down of a disgracefully racist and imperialist government that should have been buried a century ago, the last pathetic outpost of the indifference and anglocentrism we thought we had left behind."

The Appeals Court ordered the case reassigned to another judge [December 7, 2006. Case reassigned to Judge James Robertson for all further proceedings].

=== Internet reconnection ===
On May 14, 2008, Judge James Robertson issued an order allowing five offices and bureaus of the Department of Interior to be reconnected to the internet. The Office of the Solicitor, the Bureau of Indian Affairs, the Office of Hearings and Appeals, the Office of the Special Trustee, and the Office of Historical Trust Accounting had been disconnected since December 17, 2001, when the government entered a Consent Order that stipulated how affected government offices could demonstrate proper compliance and reconnect to the internet. Judge Robertson's order vacated the Consent Order. In the following weeks, these offices and bureaus were reconnected, and their websites again became publicly accessible.

=== Historical accounting trial ===
In 2008, the district court awarded the plaintiffs $455.6 million, which both sides appealed. Cobell v. Kempthorne, 569 F. Supp.2d 223, 226 (D.D.C. 2008).

On July 29, 2009, the D.C. Court of Appeals vacated the award and remanded the District Court's previous decision in Cobell XXI. See, Cobell v. Salazar (Cobell XXII), 573 F.3d 808 (D.C. Cir. 2009).

== Settlement ==
On December 8, 2009, the Barack Obama administration announced having reached a negotiated settlement in the trust case. In 2010 Congress passed the Claims Resolution Act of 2010, which provided $3.4 billion for the settlement of the Cobell v. Salazar class-action trust case (and four Indian water-rights cases.) Among the provisions of the settlement are for the government to buy land from Indian owners, which has been highly fractionated by being divided among heirs over the generations, and return it to communal tribal ownership. This was to correct a longstanding issue that was supposed to have been a temporary provision.

$1.4 billion of the settlement is allocated to plaintiffs in the suit. Up to $2 billion is allocated for re-purchase of lands distributed under the Dawes Act.

President Barack Obama signed legislation authorizing government funding of a final version of the $3.4 billion settlement in December 2010, raising the possibility of resolution after fourteen years of litigation. Judge Thomas Hogan was to oversee a fairness hearing on the settlement in the spring of 2011.

A December 2014 press release on the Indian Trust website indicated mailing of checks to "approximately 263,500" claimants. "Over two-thirds of checks have been cashed within 10 days of their arrival and over 80% of class members have received their Historical Accounting payments."

As another part of the settlement, the government set up a scholarship fund, named the Cobell Education Scholarship Fund in honor of lead plaintiff Elouise Cobell. It contributes money on a quarterly basis from sales in the buy-back program, with a cap of $60 million. By November 2016, the total amount contributed to the scholarship fund so far was $40 million. The Scholarship Fund provides financial assistance through scholarships to American Indian and Alaska Native students wishing to pursue post-secondary and graduate education and training.

In addition to payments to individual plaintiffs, the government has paid $900 million to individuals to buy back the equivalent of 1.7 million acres in fractionated land interests, restoring more of the land base of reservations to tribal control.

=== Reform ===
Following the settlement, in late 2011, the Secretary of the Interior created the National Commission on Indian Trust Administration and Reform to evaluate the Indian trust system. The commission included five members, including a Harvard Law School professor and the presidents of the Quinault Indian Nation and the Navajo Nation.

== See also ==
- List of class-action lawsuits
