= Native American self-determination =

Social movements by which Native Americans in the U.S. exercise self-governance

Native American self-determination refers to the social movements, legislation and beliefs by which the Native American tribes in the United States exercise self-governance and decision-making on issues that affect their own people.

== Conceptual origin ==
Flag of the Haudenosaunee

Self-determination is defined as the movement by which the Native Americans sought to achieve restoration of tribal community, self-government, cultural renewal, reservation development, educational control and equal or controlling input into federal government decisions concerning policies and programs. The beginnings of the federal policy favoring self-determination dates back to the 1930s. In 1933 John Collier, a social worker and reformer who had long worked in American Indian affairs, was appointed commissioner of the Bureau of Indian Affairs under President Franklin D. Roosevelt. He was likely the most knowledgeable person about American Indians appointed to this position up until then. He respected tribal cultures and values.

The U.S. Congress passed Collier's legislation, the Indian Reorganization Act of 1934, although with numerous changes. It was to enable tribes to reorganize their governments and strengthen their communities. It ended the allotment of Indian lands to individual households, which had led to loss of control over their territories. The law was intended to decrease the paternalistic power of the BIA which extended to their running numerous Indian boarding schools where American Indian children were forced to give up native languages and cultural practices. Four years before the passage of the Indian Reorganization Act, the government acknowledged that the paternalism was unfair to the Indian tribes and their people. The IRA was called the Indian "New Deal" by the Roosevelt administration. The IRA enabled the restoration of tribal governments but Congress made many changes in response to outcries from lobbyists and the bill fell short of the policy of "Indian self-determination without termination."

During the 1950s government policy toward American Indians changed and politicians recommended termination of many of the tribes' special relationships with the government under federal recognition of their status in favor of assimilation. Over 100 tribes were terminated: those that weren't suffered increased governmental paternalism. Activism for civil rights and American Indian rights increased during and after the 1960s and strengthened the movement for self-determination.

=== Post-1960 ===
Self-determination was not official federal government policy until 1970 when President Richard M. Nixon addressed the issue in his July 8 congressional message of "Recommendations for Indian Policy." He discussed his goal of policy changes that supported Indian self-determination.

It is long-past time that the Indian policies of the Federal government began to recognize and build upon the capacities and insights of the Indian people. Both as a matter of Justice, and as a matter of enlightened social policy, we must begin to act on the basis of what the Indians themselves have long been telling us. The time has come to break decisively with the past, and to create the conditions for a new era in which the Indian future is determined by Indian acts and Indian decisions.

In 1968 Congress passed the Indian Civil Rights Act after recognizing that the Indian termination policies of the mid-1940s to mid-1960s had failed. American Indians had successfully kept their cultures and religions alive, and the government recognized that the goal of assimilation was wrong. The bill was to grant the provisions of the Bill of Rights to the tribal peoples. In the following years, Congress passed more legislation to carry out Nixon's programs to develop a stronger relationship of trust between the federal government and the tribes, and to allow the tribes to manage their own affairs.

Another example is the Indian Self-Determination and Education Assistance Act of 1975. This act enabled the federal government to make direct contracts with the Indian tribes just as it does with the states, for implementation of programs and distribution of funds. Rather than the BIA administering programs directly, the government would contract with tribes to manage health care, for instance, or educational benefits.

The Indian Child Welfare Act (1978) "... recognized tribal courts as the primary and ultimate forum for welfare and custody cases concerning Native children. "By promising to look after the tribes' children, the ICWA contributed to the economic and cultural welfare of each tribe's future.

The American Indian Religious Freedom Act (1978) "...recognized the integrity of native cultures." It ended the persecution of American Indians for such practices as the use of peyote in religion ceremony.

Since 1980, administrations have issued Presidential Memoranda on Indian affairs to indicate direction for increased tribal sovereignty. A 1994 Presidential Memorandum issued by Bill Clinton changed the way the U.S. Department of Housing and Urban Development supported housing programs. The Native American Housing Assistance and Self-Determination Act of 1996 consolidated grant programs for housing funding into a single block grant specifically available to recognized governments of American Indians and Alaska Natives.

== Leaders ==
A renewal of Indian activism since the 1960s saw the rise of a new generation of leaders. Public protests created publicity for their cause, such as the occupation of Alcatraz and Mount Rushmore, the Wounded Knee Incident, and other examples of American Indians uniting to change their relationship with the United States government. Strong Indian leaders traveled across America to try to add unification to the Indian cause. The leaders arose in different fields, starting independent newspapers, promoting educational independence, working to reclaim lands, and to enforce treaty rights. Another campaign occurred in the Pacific Northwest as Billy Frank, Jr. and Hank Adams fought for native treaty fishing rights. The result was a Native American force which fought for change throughout a wide variety of interconnected social spheres.

=== Education ===
==== Richard Oakes ====
A member of the St Regis Mohawks of Akwesasne, NY he led the occupation of Alcatraz along with Denis Turner, a member of the Rincon Band of Luiseño Indians and others. He was instrumental in creating the first ever American Indian studies program at San Francisco State University. He was murdered by a white supremacist while volunteering at summer camp in Northern California for Native youth.

==== Allan Yazzie ====
For decades since the late 19th century, Native Americans were forced to send their children to boarding schools where they were made to speak and write in English only, and to learn the majority culture and Christian religion. Native Americans wanted to teach their children their own values and cultures. In the 1960s, Allan Yazzie (Navajo) proposed creation of a Navajo school to be built on the tribe's land in Arizona and operated by the tribe. The project was called the Rough Rock Demonstration School, and it was to administered solely by the Navajo Indians (without BIA oversight.) Although many politicians thought that the school would fail immediately, it prevailed. It became a strong sign of Indian self-determination and success. In 1968, the Navajo established the first tribal college, to be followed by other tribes developing similar tribal colleges on their own reservations.

=== Land reclamation and anti-termination ===
==== Paul Bernal ====
Paul Bernal (also known as Sherry Beni) fought for the Taos Pueblo tribe of New Mexico, who wanted to reclaim their sacred religious site, Blue Lake. It had been taken by the Forest Service at the start of the twentieth century for inclusion in a national forest. Throughout the 1960s, Bernal and the Pueblo had little success in regaining the lake. The administration of Richard Nixon supported self-determination for American Indians. After Senate hearings (where Bernal was harassed by senators who thought that the Indians wanted the land for other than religious purposes), Nixon signed a bill to return the lake to the Taos Pueblo.

==== Ada Deer ====
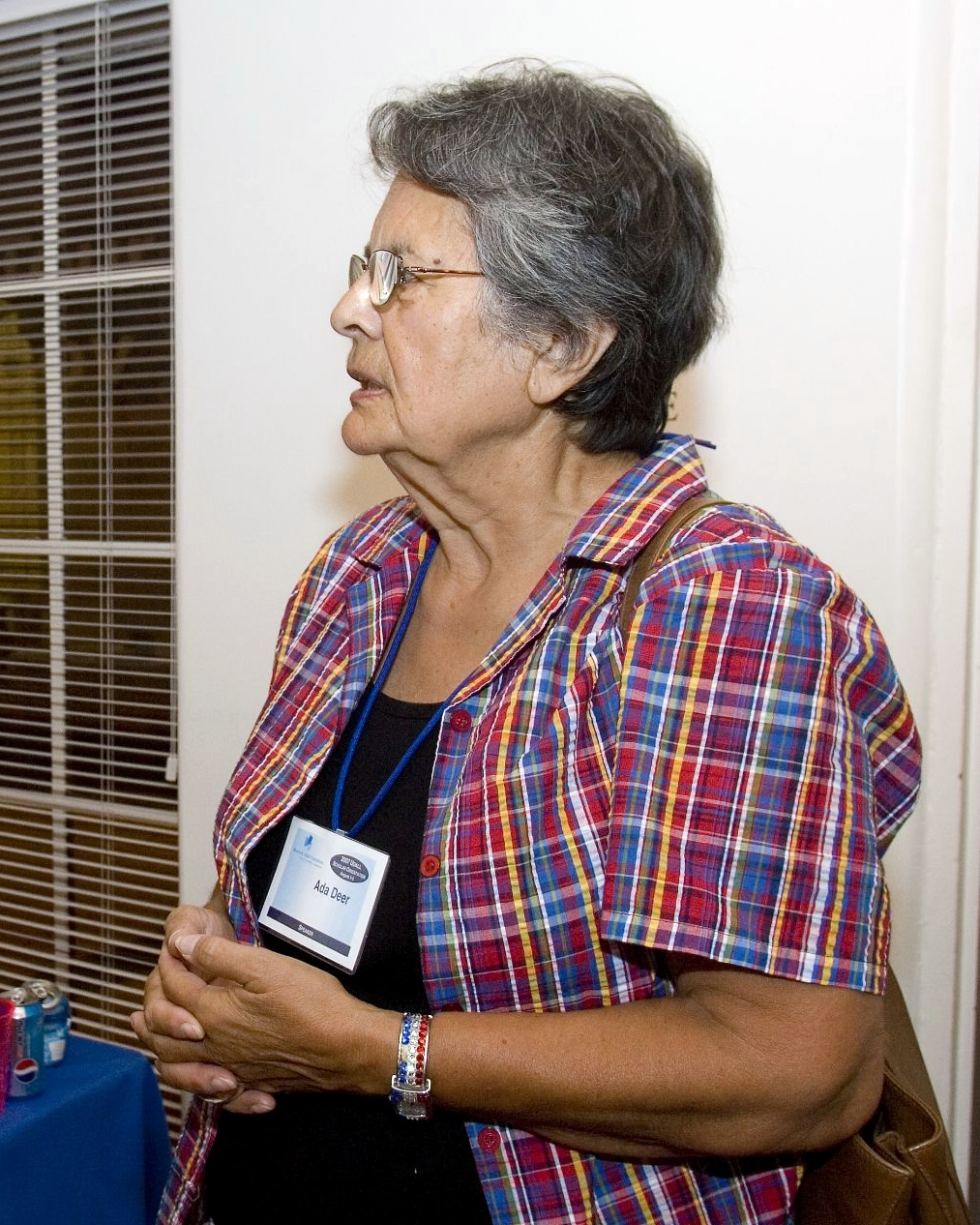
Ada Deer

Ada Deer (1935-2023) was a leader of the Menominee tribe, which has a reservation in Wisconsin. In the 1960s, Deer helped mobilize her tribe to oppose the government's proposed termination of its relationship with the federal government. By 1972, Deer had gained support for her tribe's movement, and many governors, senators, and congressman gave her and the Menominee tribe their full-fledged approval. Deer fought against the Interior Committee chairman (Wayne Aspinall), who supported the tribe's termination, and their loss of 250,000 acres (1,000 km^{2}) of communal land under termination policies. Ada Deer continued to lobby for the Menominee Restoration Act. After Aspinall failed to win an election, the tribe prevailed and the act was signed by President Nixon. Ada Deer (along with such people as Lucy Covington) was one of the early examples of self-determination in tribal members; her efforts helped restore all the terminated lands back to the Menominee tribe.

==== D'Arcy McNickle ====
D'Arcy McNickle (Cree and Salish-Kootenai) was a member of the Flathead Indian Reservation. He served as the chair of a committee of Indian leaders at the 1961 American Indian Chicago Conference, and crafted an Indian policy called "Declaration of Indian purpose." The policy outlined many solutions to the problems of termination. It was a sign of change in the 1960s and 1970s when the termination era ended. The "Declaration of Indian purpose" was given to President John F. Kennedy by the National Congress of American Indians. The tribal governments started to bypass the BIA and focus on self-determination plans.

=== Legal activism ===
==== John Echohawk ====
John Echohawk (Pawnee) is a founder and leader of the Native American Rights Fund (NARF). He is a lawyer who has worked to protect Indian land and sovereignty. In 1970 Echohawk was the first Native American to graduate from the University of New Mexico's school of law. After law school, Echohawk worked for some time with California Indian Legal Services. Echohawk joined together with other lawyers and tribal members to form the NARF, which was similar to the NAACP (both were formed to organize civil rights activism). Under Echohawk, NARF's focused on preserving tribes, protecting tribal resources, protecting human rights, ensuring government responsibility, expanding Indian law, and educating people about Indian issues. Through NARF, Echohawk has gained government recognition of tribal sovereignty and participated in drafting the Native American Graves Protection and Repatriation Act signed into law by President George H. W. Bush in 1990.

==== Rosalind McClanahan ====
Rosalind McClanahan (Navajo) opposed Arizona's imposing a state income tax on members of her tribe who lived and worked within the Navajo Reservation, which she considered an issue of tribal sovereignty. McClanahan lived and worked in the reservation, and was taxed. She enlisted the help of DNA (a group of Native American rights attorneys), and appealed the case to the United States Supreme Court in 1973 after the state court had ruled in favor of the state's ability to require that tax. The resulting U.S. Supreme Court ruling was in favor of McClanahan, and tribal rights of members to be excluded from state taxes within tribal sovereign land. She helped establish stronger self-rule for the Navajo as well as other Native American tribes.

== Organizations ==
Several Native American organizations provided an immense amount of support that either helped set the precedent for the self-determination movement or further strengthen the policy. These organizations can be divided mainly into two levels: associations that were nationally operated and those groups that were organized for local action.

=== National ===
In 1944, the National Congress of American Indians (NCAI) was founded "in response to termination and assimilation policies that the United States forced upon the tribal governments in contradiction of their treaty rights and status as sovereigns. NCAI stressed the need for unity and cooperation among tribal governments for the protection of their treaty and sovereign rights". "Recognizing the threat posed by termination, [NCAI] fought to maintain Indians' legal rights and cultural identity." Indian policy has been federalized since colonial times; however, "until the 1940s, in spite of such major national initiatives as allotment and the Indian Reorganization Act, Indians had never been able to organize on a national basis". Groups such as the Friends of the Indians in the late nineteenth century and the Association on American Indian Affairs (est. 1922) had nearly all-white membership. The NCAI was an Indian-only organization with membership based on tribes, not individuals. Although the "NCAI's fortunes would ebb and flow … the return of Indian veterans at the end of World War II" gave the organization and the Indian people an unexpected boost. "Whether they settled in Indian country or in the cities, these veterans realized expectations and bred a much-needed impatience and assertiveness." According to Helen Peterson, later executive director of NCAI, "World War Two revived the Indians' capacity to act on their own behalf." With the NCAI, Native American people relied on their own people to organize and affect national policy. The NCAI was one of the first major steps in halting termination and giving life to the Self-Determination era.

The Office of Economic Opportunity (OEO), a result of President Lyndon B. Johnson's War on Poverty legislation and the Economic Opportunity Act of 1964, provided grants and other funds directly to tribal governments rather than only state and federal agencies. The War on Poverty Grants "empowered tribes by building tribal capacities, creating independence from the BIA, and knitting tribes together with other tribes and the country as a whole." As Philip S. Deloria explains, the OEO helped the Indian people become more independent and powerful: for the first time "… Indian tribal governments had money and were not beholden for it to the Bureau of Indian Affairs … Tribes could, to some degree, set their own priorities." Renewed self-determination by tribes "altered the nature of the [BIA] and the relationship between tribes and the federal government". The independence gained by tribes from dealing with the Office of Economic Opportunity helped change the dynamic of Indian affairs in relation to the federal government.

The Native American Rights Fund (NARF) is a national legal-advocacy and nonprofit organization founded by Indians in 1970 to assist Indians in their legal battles. It has become the primary national advocacy group for Native Americans. "It is funded largely by grants from private foundations and (despite its adversarial relationship) the Federal Government." NARF's legal, policy, and public education work is concentrated in five key areas: preservation of tribes; protection of tribal natural resources; promotion of Native American human rights; accountability of governments to Native Americans; and development of Indian law and educating the public about Indian rights, laws, and issues. "NARF focuses on applying existing laws and treaties to guarantee that national and state governments live up to their legal obligations [and] … works with religious, civil rights, and other Native American organizations to shape the laws that will help assure the civil and religious rights of all Native Americans." Since its inception, NARF has provided legal expertise at the national level. NARF has trained many young attorneys, both Indians and non-Indians, who intend to specialize in Native American legal issues. "NARF has successfully argued every Supreme Court case involving Native Americans since 1973." NARF has affected tens of thousands of Indian people in its work for more than 250 tribes in all fifty states to develop strong self-governance, sound economic development, prudent natural resources management and positive social development. It continues to handle civil rights cases for the Native American community in the United States.

=== Regional ===
Accomplishments and progress of Native American organizations on the national level inspired change on the local level. It did not take too long for local tribes to begin to establish their own organizations that would benefit them directly. One of the earliest of such organizations was the Determination of Rights and Unity for Menominee Shareholders (DRUMS) – a citizens' group founded in 1970. It focused on stopping the Legend Lake sales, establishing Menominee control over the Menominee Enterprises, Inc. (MEI), and, eventually, even reversing termination, which was the main purpose of self-determination. DRUMS made an immediate impact. Within months of establishment, the Menominee organized a series of well-planned and smoothly executed demonstrations. In an effort to interrupt the Legend Lake land development, DRUMS picketed Legend Lake's Menominee County sales office and promotional events in nearby cities, such as Milwaukee, Green Bay, and Appleton. In October 1971, DRUMS led an impressive 12-day, 220-mile (350 km) from Menominee County, to the state capitol in Madison. Like the other DRUMS protests, the march to Madison, was non-violent but sharp-edged nonetheless. Minnesota Governor Patrick Lucey met with DRUMS leaders and discussed prevalent issues in the Menominee community. Within a month of the march, Governor Lucey visited Menominee County, and consistently supported the Menominee movement. In addition, DRUMS managed to produce a first draft of the Menominee restoration bill by the end of 1971 and by early 1972 the tribe had already obtained an astounding level of support, including the support of Democratic Presidential nominee Henry Jackson. Though it took a prodigious amount of work, the Menominee Restoration Act moved through Congress with rare speed. In April 1975, MEI was dissolved and all Menominee lands were transferred back to the tribe, to be held in trust by the United States of America and governed by the sovereign Menominee Tribe of Wisconsin. Although DRUMS set its sights on improving the status of the local Menominee people, it was a big step toward the nationwide self-determination movement. The success of DRUMS let other Indians know that they too could make an impact, if only on a local level, and motivated other tribes to fight for their rights. On the national scope, DRUMS allowed Native American leaders to assume prominent positions. For instance, Ada Deer was catapulted to the top of the federal government; In 1993, Deer was appointed Assistant Secretary of the Interior by President Bill Clinton and served as head of the Bureau of Indian Affairs from 1993–1997.

== Institutional capacity ==
The new policy of the Office of Economic Opportunity, which sought to directly involve the recipients of its aid, provided further impetus for self-determination in education. The success of the OEO Head Start preschool program was attributed primarily to the fact that Indians were "allowed to operate programs." For the first time in history, Deloria commented, "Indian parents have become excited about education for their children. … For the last 100 years, the Government has been doing things for us and telling us what is best for Indians … of course there has been no progress … ." Progress in education was just one area in which Native Americans were gaining more independence. As tribes began to have more control over their own affairs and have more infrastructure entitled to them, they were able to be in much more command of their space, make more money, which led to power and progress.

== See also ==
- Contemporary Native American issues in the United States
- Legal status of Hawaii
  - Hawaiian sovereignty movement
  - United States federal recognition of Native Hawaiians
- Aboriginal self-government in Canada
- Ethnic separatism
- Indigenous rights
- Self-determination
  - Self-determination of Australian Aborigines
- Tribal sovereignty in the United States
- National questions
- Federally recognized tribe
- List of federally recognized tribes
