= John EchoHawk =

American lawyer

John E. Echohawk (Pawnee, born August 12, 1945) is a Native American attorney and founder of the Native American Rights Fund, established in 1970. He is a leading member of the Native American self-determination movement. In 2024, he was elected to the American Philosophical Society.

== Early life and education ==
John E. Echohawk was born on August 12, 1945, into a Pawnee family and is an enrolled citizen of the tribe.

In 1970, Echohawk earned his JD, becoming the first Native American to graduate from the University of New Mexico School of Law. He decided to use his knowledge to benefit Native Americans who do not understand Native American legal and political issues.

== Career ==
Echohawk is the older brother of Idaho politician Larry Echo Hawk, who served as Idaho's attorney general from 1991 to 1995, and as director of the Bureau of Indian Affairs in the Obama administration. John was influential in encouraging Larry to earn his JD. In 1994, John Echohawk served as the Wayne Morse Chair of Law and Politics, established in honor of the late former Senator, at the University of Oregon.

Echohawk served on President Obama's first transition team, coordinating Indian affairs. He was considered by the Obama administration as a possible nominee to the federal bench. The brothers are cousins of Walter Echo-Hawk, a senior staff attorney at the Native American Rights Fund who contributed to the Native American Graves Protection and Repatriation Act.

=== Native American Rights Fund ===
After law school, Echohawk joined the staff of California Indian Legal Services then joined other lawyers and tribal members to form the Native American Rights Fund in 1970, which was similar in goals to the National Association for the Advancement of Colored People (NAACP) (both were based on civil rights activism of minority groups). The Native American Rights Fund is a non-profit law firm dedicated to protecting indigenous rights in the U.S. and around the world. Echohawk centered the Native American Rights Fund's focus around preserving tribes, protecting tribal resources, protecting human rights, ensuring government responsibility, expanding Indian law and educating people about Indian issues. Through the group, Echohawk has had a range of civil rights successes, from government recognition of the reach of tribal sovereignty to passage of the Native American Graves Protection and Repatriation Act; the Native American Rights Fund embodies the mission to: preserve tribal existence, protect tribal natural resources, promote human rights, ensure accountability of governments, and, develop Native North American law and educate the public about Native American rights, laws, and issues.

In August 2023, Echohawk was honored with the American Bar Association's Thurgood Marshall Award.
