= Tribal Law and Order Act of 2010 =

American legislation concerning American Indian tribal courts

- Long title: An Act to protect Indian arts and crafts through the improvement of applicable criminal proceedings, and for other purposes.
- Acronyms (colloquial): TLOA
- Enacted by: the 111th United States Congress
- Effective: July 29, 2010

Citations
- Public law: 111-211
- Statutes at Large: 124 Stat. 2258

Codification
- U.S.C. sections created: 25 U.S.C.: Indians; 42 U.S.C.: Public Health and Social Welfare
- U.S.C. sections amended: 25 U.S.C. ch. 7A § 305; 25 U.S.C. ch. 14, subch. II § 458ccc; 25 U.S.C. ch. 15, subch. I § 1302; 25 U.S.C. ch. 30 § 2801; 25 U.S.C. ch. 38A § 3651; 42 U.S.C. ch. 46, subch. III § 3732; 42 U.S.C. ch. 46, subch. XII-A § 3796h; 42 U.S.C. ch. 46, subch. XII-E § 3796dd; 42 U.S.C. ch. 136, subch. III § 14044

Legislative history
- Introduced in the House as H.R. 725 by Ed Pastor (D–AZ) on January 27, 2009; Committee consideration by House Natural Resources, House Judiciary; Passed the House on January 19, 2010 (Passed voice vote); Passed the Senate on June 23, 2010 (Passed unanimous consent) with amendment; House agreed to Senate amendment on July 21, 2010 (326-92 Roll call vote 455, via Clerk.House.gov); Signed into law by President Barack H. Obama II on July 29, 2010

The Tribal Law and Order Act of 2010, being Title II of Public Law 111–211, is a law, signed into effect by President Obama, that expands the punitive abilities of tribal courts across the nation. The law allows tribal courts operating in Indian country to increase jail sentences handed down in criminal cases. This was a major step toward improving enforcement and justice in Indian country.

Before this law, tribal courts were limited in the scope of punishment they could hand down in criminal cases, giving them the impression of a lower, less serious court. They now possess the power under the Tribal Law and Order Act to pass increased sentences at the court's discretion.

== Justice issues on Indian reservations ==
Once individual Indian Reservations began creating and operating Tribal Courts they were faced with multiple issues including jurisdictional questions, length of sentences that could be imposed, and sentencing guidelines to name a few. These newly formed Tribal Courts also found themselves dealing with a very large domestic violence problem on their Reservations. This problem became such an issue that it caught the attention of the United States Department of Justice.

== Passage of the Act ==
In 2007, the National Congress of American Indians passed a resolution at its Midyear conference in Anchorage, Alaska, calling for Congress to redirect the law enforcement priorities of the Department of Justice on Indian reservations, and to empower tribal government law enforcement. Scholars, such as Kevin Washburn, had written extensively about the problem and the lack of tribal involvement in federal criminal justice on Indian reservations in 2007. In 2008, Denver Post reporter Michael Riley published a four-part series of articles called "Lawless Lands; The Crisis in Indian Country" drawing attention to the problem. The reporter later won the American Bar Association's Silver Gavel Award for the legal reporting, further drawing attention to the issue. This attention was followed by several years of hearings and legislative drafting in the Senate Committee on Indian Affairs.

In 2009, Attorney General Eric Holder made it a Department of Justice priority to increase engagement, coordination and action on public safety in Indian Country. Beginning with a Tribal Nations Listening Tour in October 2009, Attorney General Holder and other Department officials met with tribal leaders to engage in a dialogue on public safety and law enforcement issues critical to tribal communities. The Justice officials heard from tribal leaders about the pressing need for federal legislation and financial resources to help tribal public safety officials better address the problems facing their communities. They learned about the disproportionate rates of violence and victimization in tribal communities, and about the need to improve government-to-government collaboration and provide improved access to law enforcement and justice resources. Finally, Attorney General Holder and the Justice Department brought this message to Capitol Hill and worked in concert with members of the House and Senate to pass the Tribal Law and Order Act.

== Provisions ==
The Tribal Law and Order Act of 2010 (Pub.L. 111–211, H.R. 725, 124 Stat. 2258, enacted July 29, 2010) enacts a United States law aimed at strengthening tribal law enforcement in order to remedy what some considered lax law enforcement on Indian reservations.

The purposes of the Tribal Law and Order Act are: Clarify the responsibilities of the federal, state, tribal, and local governments with respect to crimes in Indian Country; increase coordination and communication among federal, state, tribal, and local law enforcement agencies; empower tribal governments with the authority, resources, and information necessary to safely and effectively provide public safety in Indian Country; reduce the prevalence of violent crime in Indian Country and to combat sexual and domestic violence against Alaska Native and Native American women; prevent drug trafficking and reduce rates of alcohol and drug addiction in Indian Country; and increase and standardize the collection of criminal data to and the sharing of criminal history information among federal, state, tribal, and local officials responsible for responding to and investigating crimes in Indian Country. TLOA authorizes expanded sentencing authority for tribal justice systems, clarifies jurisdiction in "PL 280 states," requires enhanced information sharing, authorizes liaisons within each U.S. Attorney's Office and encourages more intergovernmental collaboration between tribal, federal, state, and local governments.

In addition, the law provides funding for preventative programs for alcohol and substance abuse treatments and programs for at-risk youth.

=== Reports ===
On May 30, 2013 the first report of statistics gathered under the act was released by the Department of Justice. It covered 2011 and 2012 and showed a 54% increase in prosecutions in 2012 as compared to 2008. However, substantial problems remained with prosecution being declined in 60% of reported crimes due to lack of evidence.

== Indian tribes using the Act ==
On a more local level, in August 2012, the Eastern Band of Cherokee Indians in Cherokee, NC became the second Indian Tribe to enact the TLOA. This passage allows the Cherokee Tribal Court to begin enhanced sentencing of defendants under their jurisdiction. In March 2011, the Confederated Tribes of the Umatilla Indian Reservation became the first tribe in the nation to implement felony sentencing authority under TLOA.
