= The Foundation for Natural Resources and Energy Law =

Non-profit organization

- Formation: 1955
- Type: 501(c)(3)
- Headquarters: Westminster, Colorado, United States
- Region served: Global
- Executive Director: Alex Ritchie
- Website: www.fnrel.org

The Foundation for Natural Resources and Energy Law, formerly Rocky Mountain Mineral Law Foundation, is an educational, non-profit organization dedicated to the scholarly and practical study of all aspects of natural resources and energy law.

The Foundation is governed by a Board of Directors and guided by a Trustees Council that includes representatives from constituent law schools, bar associations, and mining and oil and gas associations. Leading legal, land, and other experts work as volunteers to the Foundation and its committees.

The Foundation values collegiality and brings together lawyers, professionals, academics, and students to learn and network in a supportive environment where all participants are valued.

== Programs ==
In fulfilling its goals, the Foundation carries out varied programs of interest to attorneys, landmen, management, government personnel, law faculty, students, and others involved in mining, oil and gas, energy, water, public lands, and related areas of natural resources law. These programs include institutes, short courses, and workshops in various locations around the world. The Foundation also provides webinars and other live virtual programs, as well as on-demand online natural resources educational programming.

== Publications ==
In addition to institutes and courses, the Foundation publishes a variety of educational materials:

- American Law of Mining — Mining legal treatise.
- Law of Federal Oil and Gas Leases — Oil and gas legal treatise.
- Landman's Legal Handbook — Practical manual for landmen.
- Annual Institute Proceedings — Compilation of papers presented at RMMLF Annual Institutes.
- Special Institute Materials — Papers presented at various Special Institutes.
- Digital Library — Online access to the Proceedings of the Annual Institutes, papers presented at Special Institutes, and original RMMLF Journal articles.
- Mineral Law Newsletter — Current developments in mineral law.
- Water Law Newsletter — Current developments in water law.
- Gower Federal Services — Decisions of the Interior Board of Land Appeals and the Office of Natural Resources Revenue relating to mining, oil and gas, outer continental shelf, and royalty issues.
- RMMLF Journal — Original and reprinted law review articles.

== Grants & Scholarships ==
The Foundation offers grants to promote scholarship, research, writing, teaching, and the study of natural resources and energy law and related fields. Scholarships are available for qualified law students at Foundation constituent law schools who demonstrate interest in pursuing careers in natural resources, energy, and related fields.
