= Native American Rights Fund =

U.S. non-profit organization

- Abbreviation: NARF
- Formation: 1970; 56 years ago
- Type: 501(c)(3)
- Locations: Boulder, Colorado; Washington, D.C.; Anchorage, Alaska
- Executive Director: John Echohawk
- Affiliations: Alliance for Justice; Independent Sector
- Revenue: $24.6M (2024)
- Expenses: $20.5M (2024)
- Staff: more than 20 attorneys
- Website: narf.org

The Native American Rights Fund (NARF) is a non-profit organization, based in Boulder, Colorado, that uses existing laws and treaties to ensure that U.S. state governments and the U.S. federal government live up to their legal obligations. NARF also "provides legal representation and technical assistance to Indian tribes, organizations and individuals nationwide."

== Background ==
The Native American Rights Fund started as a pilot project under California Indian Legal Services in Berkeley, then spun off and moved to Boulder in 1971. David Getches was the founding Executive Director with John Echohawk (Pawnee) taking over the role in 1973. Attorney Charles Wilkinson joined in 1971. Echohawk serves as executive director. NARF is governed by a volunteer board of directors composed of thirteen Native Americans from different tribes throughout the country with a variety of expertise in Indian matters. A staff of fifteen attorneys handles about fifty major cases at any given time, with most of the cases taking several years to resolve. Cases are accepted on the basis of their breadth and potential importance in setting precedents and establishing important principles of Indian law.

In September 2001, tribal leaders met in Washington, D.C., and established the Tribal Supreme Court Project in an effort to "strengthen tribal advocacy before the U.S. Supreme Court by developing new litigation strategies and coordinating tribal legal resources." The ultimate goal is to improve the win–loss record of Indian tribes in Supreme Court cases. The Project is staffed by attorneys from NARF and the National Congress of American Indians (NCAI) and consists of a Working Group of over 200 attorneys and academics from around the nation who specialize in Indian law and other areas of law that impact Indian cases, including property law, trust law and Supreme Court practice. In addition, an Advisory Board of Tribal Leaders assists the Project by providing the necessary political and tribal perspective to the legal and academic expertise.

== Tribal Supreme Court Project ==
The Tribal Supreme Court Project does the following:

- In conjunction with the National Indian Law Library (NILL), monitors Indian law cases in the state and federal appellate courts that have the potential to reach the Supreme Court (NILL Indian Law Bulletins)
- Maintains an on-line depository of briefs and opinions in all Indian law cases filed with the U.S. Supreme Court and cases being monitored in the U.S. Court of Appeal and State Supreme Courts (Court Documents)
- Prepares an Update Memorandum of Cases which provides an overview of Indian law cases pending before the U.S. Supreme Court, cases being monitored and the current work being performed by the Project
- Offers assistance to tribal leaders and their attorneys to determine whether to file a Petition for a Writ of Certiorari to the U.S. Supreme Court in cases where they lost in the court below
- Offers assistance to attorneys representing Indian tribes to prepare their Brief in Opposition at the Petition Stage in cases where they won in the court below
- Coordinates an Amicus Brief writing network and helps to develop litigation strategies at both the Petition Stage and the Merits Stage to ensure that the briefs receive the maximum attention of the Justices
- When appropriate, prepares and submits Amicus Briefs on behalf of Indian tribes and Tribal Organizations
- Provides other brief writing assistance, including reviewing and editing of the principal briefs, and the performance of additional legal research
- Coordinates and conducts Moot Court and Roundtable opportunities for attorneys who are presenting Oral Arguments before the Court
- Conducts conference calls and fosters panel discussions among attorneys nationwide about pending Indian law cases and, when necessary, forms small working groups to formulate strategy on specific issues.

== Actions ==
One of NARF's earliest cases resulted in the 1974 Boldt Decision, in which a U.S. district judge ruled that Washington State must uphold tribal treaty rights, specifically fishing rights.

NARF has represented Native peoples in the case, Cobell v. Salazar, initiated by Elouise Cobell (Blackfeet) over the U.S. Department of the Interior's mismanagement of trust funds. The historic 13-year case resulted in a $3.4 billion settlement.

NARF publishes literature pertaining to Native American rights. They currently are co-publishing a book about tribal employment law.
