= Bureau of Indian Affairs =

US government agency

- Seal

- Flag

Agency overview
- Formed: March 11, 1824; 202 years ago
- Preceding agency: Office of Indian Affairs, United States Department of War
- Jurisdiction: Federal government of the United States
- Headquarters: Main Interior Building 1849 C Street, NW Washington, DC 20240
- Employees: 4,569 (FY2020)
- Annual budget: $2.159 billion (FY2021)
- Agency executives: William Kirkland III, Assistant Secretary for Indian Affairs; Janel Broderick, Deputy Assistant Secretary for Indian Affairs
- Parent agency: United States Department of the Interior
- Website: bia.gov

The Bureau of Indian Affairs (BIA), also known as Indian Affairs (IA), is a United States federal agency within the Department of the Interior. It is responsible for implementing federal laws and policies related to Native Americans and Alaska Natives, and administering and managing over 55,700,000 acres (225,000 km^{2}) of reservations held in trust by the U.S. federal government for indigenous tribes. It renders services to roughly 2 million indigenous Americans across 574 federally recognized tribes. The BIA is governed by a director and overseen by the assistant secretary for Indian affairs, who answers to the Secretary of the Interior.

The BIA works with tribal governments to help administer law enforcement and justice; promote development in agriculture, infrastructure, and the economy; enhance tribal governance; manage natural resources; and generally advance the quality of life in tribal communities. Educational services are provided by Bureau of Indian Education—the only other agency under the assistant secretary for Indian affairs—while health care is the responsibility of the U.S. Department of Health and Human Services through its Indian Health Service.

The BIA is one of the oldest federal agencies in the U.S., with roots tracing back to the Committee on Indian Affairs established by Congress in 1775. First headed by Benjamin Franklin, the committee oversaw trade and treaty relations with various indigenous peoples, until the establishment of the Bureau of Indian Affairs by Secretary of War John C. Calhoun in 1824. The BIA gained statutory authority in 1832, and in 1849 was transferred to the newly created Department of the Interior. Until the formal adoption of its current name in 1947, the BIA was variably known as the Indian Office, the Indian Bureau, the Indian Department, and the Indian Service.

The BIA's mission and mandate historically reflected the U.S. government's prevailing policy of forced assimilation of native peoples and the annexation of their land; beginning with the Indian Self-Determination and Education Assistance Act of 1975, the BIA has increasingly emphasized tribal self-determination and peer-to-peer relationships between tribal governments and federal government.

Between 1824 and 1977, the BIA was led by a total of 42 commissioners, of whom six were of indigenous descent. Since the creation of the position of Assistant Secretary for Indian Affairs in 1977, all thirteen occupants up to the present day have been Indigenous, including Bay Mills Indian Community's Bryan Newland, appointed and confirmed to the position in 2021. As of 2020, the majority of BIA employees are American Indian or Alaska Native, the most at any time in the agency's history.

== Organization ==
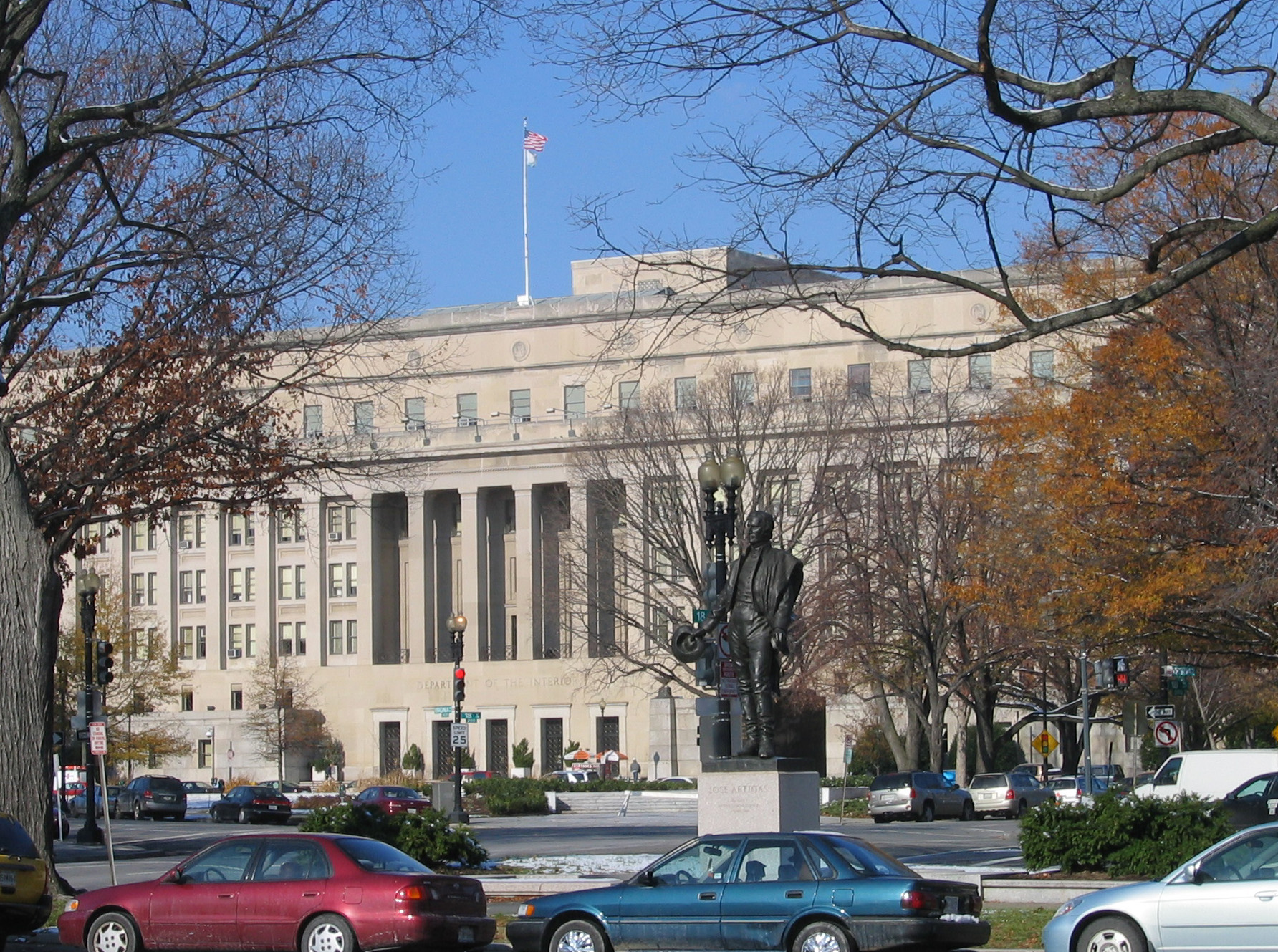
Main Interior Building, the department headquarters

Headquartered in the Main Interior Building in Washington, D.C., the BIA is headed by a bureau director who reports to the assistant secretary for Indian affairs. The current assistant secretary, exercising the delegated authority of the Assistant Secretary Indian Affairs is Scott Davis.

The BIA oversees 574 federally recognized tribes through four offices:

- Office of Indian Services: operates the BIA's general assistance, disaster relief, Indian child welfare, tribal government, Indian self-determination, and Indian Reservation Roads Program.
- Office of Justice Services (OJS): directly operates or funds law enforcement, tribal courts, and detention facilities on federal Indian lands. OJS funded 208 law enforcement agencies, consisting of 43 BIA-operated police agencies, and 165 tribally operated agencies under contract, or compact with the OJS. The office has seven areas of activity: Criminal Investigations and Police Services, Detention/Corrections, Inspection/Internal Affairs, Tribal Law Enforcement and Special Initiatives, the Indian Police Academy, Tribal Justice Support, and Program Management. The OJS also provides oversight and technical assistance to tribal law enforcement programs when and where requested. It operates four divisions: Corrections, Drug Enforcement, the Indian Police Academy, and Law Enforcement.
- Office of Trust Services: works with tribes and individual American Indians and Alaska Natives in the management of their trust lands, assets, and resources.
- The Office of Field Operations: oversees 12 regional offices; Alaska, Great Plains, Northwest, Southern Plains, Eastern, Navajo, Pacific, Southwest, Eastern Oklahoma, Midwest, Rocky Mountain, and Western; and 83 agencies, which carry out the mission of the bureau at the tribal level.

== History ==
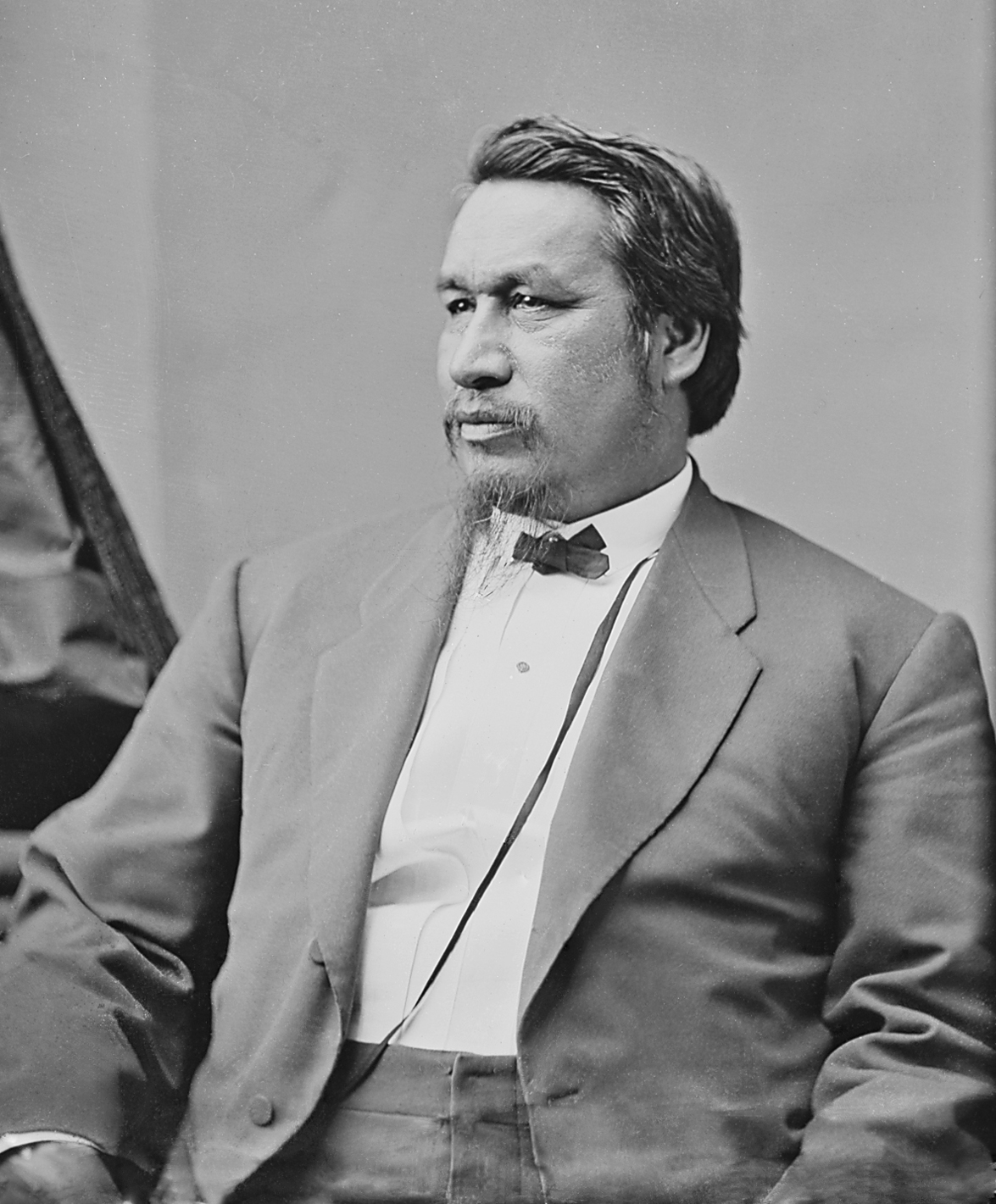
Ely S. Parker was the first Native American to be appointed as Commissioner of Indian affairs (1869–1871).

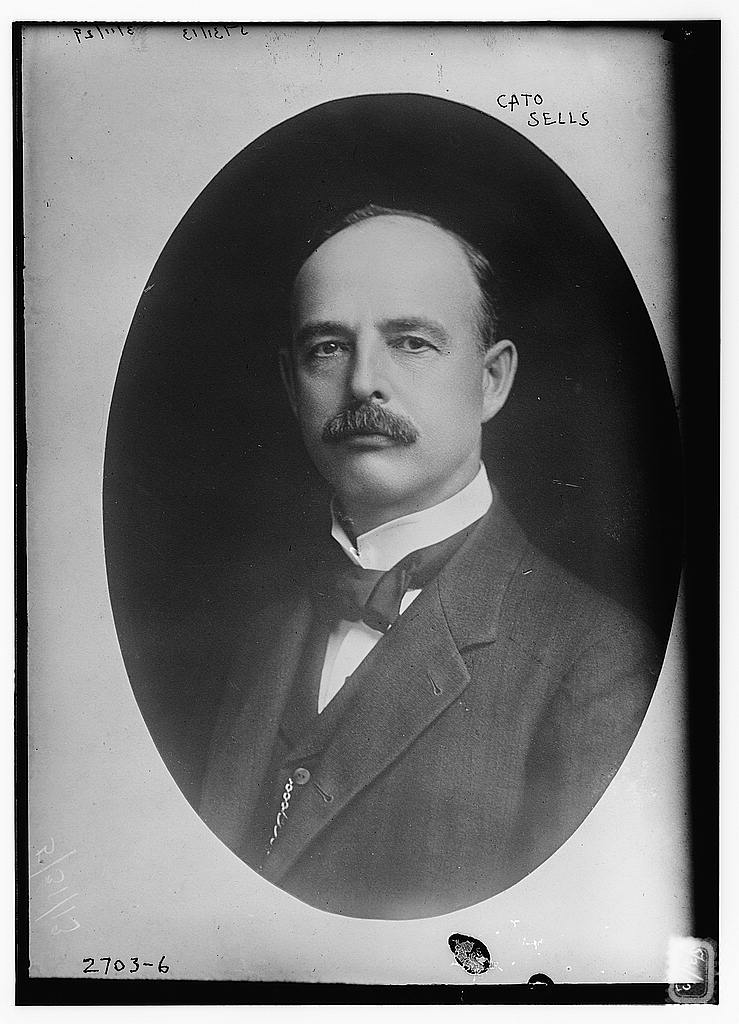
Cato Sells, Commissioner of Indian Affairs, 1913

=== Early US agencies and legislation: Intercourse Acts ===
Agencies related to Native Americans originated in 1775, when the Second Continental Congress created a trio of Indian-related agencies. Benjamin Franklin and Patrick Henry were appointed among the early commissioners to negotiate treaties with Native Americans to obtain their neutrality during the American Revolutionary War.

=== Office of Indian Trade (1806–1822) ===
In 1789, the U.S. Congress placed Native American relations within the newly formed War Department. By 1806 the Congress had created a Superintendent of Indian Trade, or "Office of Indian Trade" within the War Department, who was charged with maintaining the United States Government Fur Trade Factory System. The post was held by Thomas L. McKenney from 1816 until the abolition of the factory system in 1822.

The government licensed traders to have some control in Indian territories and gain a share of the lucrative trade.

=== Bureau of Indian Affairs (1824–present) ===
The abolition of the factory system left a vacuum within the U.S. government regarding Native American relations. The Bureau of Indian Affairs was formed on March 11, 1824, by Secretary of War John C. Calhoun, who created the agency as a division within his department, without authorization from the United States Congress. He appointed McKenney as the first head of the office, which went by several names. McKenney preferred to call it the "Indian Office", whereas the current name was preferred by Calhoun.

The bureau was initially organized by region, with commissions for Superintendents of Indian Affairs granted to prominent citizens in each region of the southern, midwestern and western United States. These superindenents were authorized to negotiate with tribes and oversaw Indian agents in their assigned region. The bureau was eventually reorganized in 1878, with superintendencies removed. These were eventually replaced with regional offices, which continue today.

=== The Removal Era (1830–1850) ===
The BIA's goal to protect domestic and dependent nations, was reaffirmed by the 1831 court case Cherokee Nation v. Georgia. The Supreme Court originally refused to hear the case, because the Cherokee nation was not an independent state and could not litigate in the federal court. It was not until the court case Worcester v. Georgia, when Chief Justice John Marshall allowed Native American tribes to be recognized as "domestic dependent nations." These court cases set precedent for future treaties, as more Native tribes were recognized as domestic and dependent nations.

This period was encompassed by westward expansion and the removal of Native Nations. In 1833 Georgians fought for the removal of the Cherokee Nation from the state of Georgia. Despite the rulings of Worcester v. Georgia, President Jackson and John C. Calhoun created a plan for removal. The removal of the Cherokee Nation occurred in 1838 and was accompanied by the Treaty of 1846. When reparations from the treaty were unfulfilled, the Senate Committee on the Indian Affairs made the final settlement in 1850. This settlement, "supported the position of the Cherokee that the cost of maintaining the tribesman during their removal and the years upkeep after their arrival West should be paid by the federal government, and the expense of the removal agents should be paid as well."

In 1832 Congress established the position of Commissioner of Indian Affairs. In 1849 Indian Affairs was transferred to the newly established U.S. Department of the Interior. In 1869, Ely Samuel Parker was the first Native American to be appointed as commissioner of Indian affairs.

=== Assimilation (1890–1930) ===
One of the most controversial policies of the Bureau of Indian Affairs was the late 19th to early 20th century decision to Americanize native children via education in boarding schools, such as the Carlisle Indian Industrial School. These boarding schools separated students from their family and local cultures, training students to behave in accordance with the prevailing standard of "civilization": Anglo-American cultural practices. The goal was to enable native children to more easily leave their reservations via cultural assimilation into American society (at the time natives were viewed as trapped on their reservations). The boarding schools prohibited students from using their indigenous languages, practices, and cultures.

Another force for assimilation and Euro-American control was the Bureau of Indian Affairs tribal police force. This was designed by its agents to decrease the power of American Indian leaders.

=== Reform and reorganization (mid to late 20th century) ===
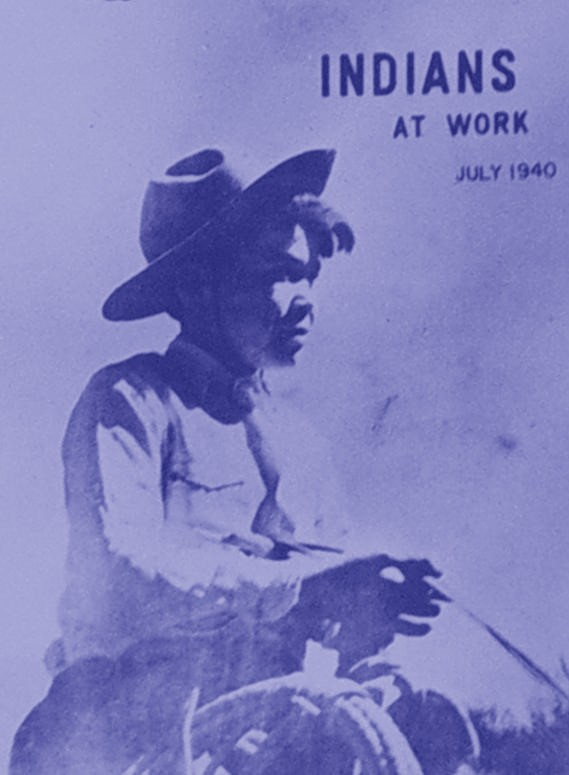
1940 Indians at Work magazine, published by the Office of Indian Affairs, predecessor agency to the Bureau of Indian Affairs

The bureau was renamed from Office of Indian Affairs to Bureau of Indian Affairs in 1947.

In 1965 the headquarters of the Bureau of Indian Affairs was moved from the Interior Department's main building at 18th St. NW. and C St. NW., Washington, D.C., to a separate building a few blocks away at 1951 Constitution Avenue NW., Washington, D.C.

With the rise of American Indian activism in the 1960s and 1970s and increasing demands for enforcement of treaty rights and sovereignty, the 1970s were a particularly turbulent period of BIA history. The rise of activist groups such as the American Indian Movement (AIM) worried the U.S. government; the FBI responded both overtly and covertly (by creating COINTELPRO and other programs) to suppress possible uprisings among native peoples.

As a branch of the U.S. government with personnel on Indian reservations, BIA police were involved in political actions such as:

The occupation of BIA headquarters in Washington, D.C., in 1972: On November 3, 1972, a group of around 500 American Indians with the AIM took over the BIA building, the culmination of their Trail of Broken Treaties walk. They intended to bring attention to American Indian issues, including their demands for renewed negotiation of treaties, enforcement of treaty rights and improvement in living standards. They occupied the Department of Interior headquarters from November 3 to 9, 1972.

Feeling the government was ignoring them, the protesters vandalized the building. After a week, the protesters left, having caused $700,000 in damages. Many records were lost, destroyed or stolen, including irreplaceable treaties, deeds, and water rights records, which some Indian officials said could set the tribes back 50 to 100 years.

- The Wounded Knee Incident of 1973, where activists at the Pine Ridge Indian Reservation occupied land for more than two months.
- The 1975 Pine Ridge shootout (for which Leonard Peltier was convicted of killing two FBI agents).

The BIA was implicated in supporting controversial tribal presidents, notably Dick Wilson, who was charged with being authoritarian; using tribal funds for a private paramilitary force, the Guardians of the Oglala Nation (or "GOON squad"), which he employed against opponents; intimidation of voters in the 1974 election; misappropriation of funds, and other misdeeds. Many native peoples continue to oppose policies of the BIA. In particular, problems in enforcing treaties, handling records and trust land incomes were disputed.

=== 21st century ===
In 2002, Congress worked with the bureau to prepare bill S.1392, which established procedures for tribal recognition. A separate bill S. 1393 ensured full and fair participation in decision-making processes at the bureau via grants. Both bills addressed what services, limitations, obligations, and responsibilities a federally recognized tribe possessed. The bills excluded any splinter groups, political factions, and any groups formed after December 31, 2002.

In 2013 the bureau was greatly affected by sequestration funding cuts of $800 million, which particularly affected the already-underfunded Indian Health Service.

== Legal issues ==
=== Employee overtime ===
The Bureau of Indian Affairs has been sued four times in class action overtime lawsuits brought by the Federation of Indian Service Employees, a union which represents the federal civilian employees of the Bureau of Indian Affairs, the Bureau of Indian Education, the assistant secretary of Indian affairs and the Office of the Special Trustee for Indian Affairs. The grievances allege widespread violations of the Fair Labor Standards Act and claim tens of millions of dollars in damages.

=== Trust assets ===
Cobell vs. Salazar, a major class action case related to trust lands, was settled in December 2009. The suit was filed against the U.S. Department of Interior, of which the BIA is a part. A major responsibility has been the management of the Indian trust accounts. This was a class-action lawsuit regarding the federal government's management and accounting of more than 300,000 individual American Indian and Alaska Native trust accounts. A settlement fund totaling $3.4 billion is to be distributed to class members. This is to compensate for claims that prior U.S. officials had mismanaged the administration of Indian trust assets. In addition, the settlement establishes a $2 billion fund enabling federally recognized tribes to voluntarily buy back and consolidate fractionated land interests.

== Mission ==
The bureau is currently trying to evolve from a supervisory to an advisory role. However, this has been a difficult task as the BIA is known by many Indians as playing a police role in which the U.S. government historically dictated to tribes and their members what they could and could not do in accordance with treaties signed by both.

== Commissioners and assistant secretaries ==
Commissioners and assistant secretaries of Indian affairs include:

=== Superintendents of Indian trade ===
From 1806 until 1822, relations with the North American tribes were regulated by the Office of Indian Trade within the Treasury Department. Three men were appointed during this time period as superintendents to negotiate treaties with and regulate trade with the native Americans.

| No. | Image | Superintendent | Term started | Term ended | Refs. |
| 1 | | John Shee | July 8, 1806 | October 3, 1807 | |
| 2 | | John Mason | October 4, 1807 | April 1, 1816 | |
| 3 | | Thomas L. McKenney | April 12, 1816 | May 6, 1822 | |

=== Superintendent of Indian Affairs ===
On the same day Congress abolished the trading houses in May 1822, Congress authorized a new position of superintendent of Indian affairs, with President James Monroe nominating, and the Senate confirming, William Clark as superintendent of Indian affairs. In 1824, the office was reorganized and William Clark's position became subservient to the new chief clerk of the Indian Office.

| No. | Image | Superintendent | Term started | Term ended | Notes |
| 1 | | William Clark | May 28, 1822 | March 11, 1824 | |
| 1 | | William Clark | March 12, 1824 | September 1, 1838 | position became subservient to the chief clerk |

=== Chief clerks of the Indian Office ===
The following three persons had served as chief clerk of the Indian Office within the War Department from 1824 until the office was transferred to the Interior Department in 1832:

| No. | Image | Chief Clerk | Term started | Term ended | Refs. |
| 1 | | Thomas L. McKenney | March 12, 1824 | August 16, 1830 | |
| 2 | | Samuel S. Hamilton | September 30, 1830 | August 31, 1831 | |
| 3 | | Elbert Herring | August 12, 1831 | July 9, 1832 | |

=== Commissioners of Indian affairs ===
The following persons have led the Bureau of Indian Affairs as Commissioner from 1832 until 1981:

| No. | Image | Commissioner | Term started | Term ended | Refs. |
| 1 | | Elbert Herring | July 10, 1832 | July 2, 1836 | |
| 2 | | Carey A. Harris | July 4, 1836 | October 19, 1838 | |
| 3 | | Thomas Hartley Crawford | October 22, 1838 | October 29, 1845 | |
| 4 | | William Medill | October 28, 1845 | June 30, 1849 | |
| 5 | | Orlando Brown | June 30, 1849 | July 1, 1850 | |
| 6 | | Luke Lea | July 1, 1850 | March 24, 1853 | |
| 7 | | George Washington Manypenny | March 31, 1853 | March 30, 1857 | |
| 8 | | James W. Denver | April 17, 1857 | December 2, 1857 | |
| 9 | | Charles E. Mix | June 14, 1858 | November 8, 1858 | |
| 10 | | James W. Denver | November 8, 1858 | March 31, 1859 | |
| 11 | | Alfred B. Greenwood | May 4, 1859 | April 13, 1861 | |
| 12 | | William P. Dole | March 12, 1861 | July 11, 1865 | |
| 13 | | Dennis N. Cooley | July 9, 1865 | November 1, 1866 | |
| 14 | | Lewis V. Bogy | November 1, 1866 | March 29, 1867 | |
| 15 | | Nathaniel Green Taylor | March 29, 1867 | April 25, 1869 | |
| 16 | | Ely S. Parker (Note: First Native American to hold the position. Seneca affiliation.) | April 26, 1869 | July 24, 1871 | |
| Acting | | Henry R. Clum | July 24, 1871 | November 20, 1871 | |
| 17 | | Francis A. Walker | November 27, 1871 | January 1, 1873 | |
| 18 | | Edward Parmelee Smith | March 17, 1873 | December 11, 1875 | |
| 19 | | John Q. Smith | December 11, 1875 | September 27, 1877 | |
| 20 | | Ezra A. Hayt | September 20, 1877 | January 29, 1880 | |
| 21 | | Rowland E. Trowbridge | March 15, 1880 | March 19, 1881 | |
| Acting | | Henry R. Clum | March 19, 1881 | April 14, 1881 | |
| 22 | | Hiram Price | May 6, 1881 | March 26, 1885 | |
| 23 | | John DeWitt Clinton Atkins | March 21, 1885 | June 14, 1888 | |
| 24 | | John H. Oberly | October 10, 1888 | June 30, 1889 | |
| 25 | | Thomas Jefferson Morgan | July 1, 1889 | March 3, 1893 | |
| 26 | | Daniel M. Browning | April 13, 1893 | May 3, 1897 | |
| 27 | | William Arthur Jones | May 3, 1897 | January 1, 1905 | |
| 28 | | Francis E. Leupp | January 1, 1905 | June 18, 1909 | |
| 29 | | Robert G. Valentine | June 29, 1909 | September 10, 1912 | |
| Acting | | Frederick H. Abbott | September 10, 1912 | June 4, 1913 | |
| 30 | | Cato Sells | June 2, 1913 | March 29, 1921 | |
| 31 | | Charles H. Burke | May 7, 1921 | June 30, 1929 | |
| 32 | | Charles J. Rhoads | April 18, 1929 | April 20, 1933 | |
| 33 | | John Collier | April 21, 1933 | January 22, 1945 | |
| 34 | | William A. Brophy | March 6, 1945 | June 3, 1948 | |
| acting | | William R. Zimmerman | June 3, 1948 | March 10, 1949 | |
| 35 | | John R. Nichols | April 13, 1949 | March 23, 1950 | |
| 36 | | Dillon S. Myer | May 5, 1950 | March 19, 1953 | |
| Acting | | W. Barton Greenwood | March 20, 1953 | July 28, 1953 | |
| 37 | | Glenn L. Emmons | August 10, 1953 | January 7, 1961 | |
| acting | | John O. Crow (Note: Cherokee affiliation.) | February 10, 1961 | September 25, 1961 | |
| 38 | | Philleo Nash | September 26, 1961 | March 15, 1966 | |
| 39 | | Robert L. Bennett (Note: Oneida affiliation.) | April 27, 1966 | May 31, 1969 | |
| 40 | | Louis R. Bruce (Note: Mohawk-Oglala Sioux affiliation.) | August 8, 1969 | January 20, 1973 | |
| Acting | | Marvin L. Franklin (Note: unconfirmed nominee) | February 7, 1973 | December 4, 1974 | |
| 41 | | Morris Thompson (Note: Athabaskans affiliation.) | December 4, 1973 | November 3, 1976 | |
| 42 | | Benjamin Reifel (Note: Sicangu Lakota affiliation.) | December 7, 1976 | January 28, 1977 | |
| Acting | | Raymond Butler | January 28, 1977 | September 19, 1977 | |
| 43 | | William E. Hallett (Note: Red Lake Chippewa affiliation.) | December 16, 1979 | January 19, 1981 | |

Table notes:

=== Assistant secretaries of the interior for Indian affairs ===
The following persons have led the Bureau of Indian Affairs as assistant secretaries of the interior for Indian affairs since 1977:

| No. | Image | Assistant Secretary | Term started | Term ended | Affiliation | Refs. |
| 1 | | Forrest Gerard | September 12, 1977 | January 19, 1980 | Blackfeet | |
| 2 | | Thomas W. Fredericks (Note: nominated, but never confirmed by Senate) | June 18, 1980 | January 19, 1981 | Mandan–Hidatsa | |
| 3 | | Kenneth L. Smith | May 13, 1981 | December 7, 1984 | Wasco | |
| 4 | | Ross Swimmer | December 5, 1985 | January 29, 1989 | Cherokee | |
| acting | | William Patrick Ragsdale | January 29, 1989 | June 20, 1989 | Cherokee | |
| 5 | | Eddie Frank Brown | June 26, 1989 | July 16, 1993 | Yaqui | |
| 6 | | Ada E. Deer | July 16, 1993 | November 12, 1997 | Menominee | |
| 7 | | Kevin Gover | November 12, 1997 | January 3, 2001 | Pawnee | |
| acting | | James H. McDivitt | January 20, 2001 | July 3, 2001 | | |
| 8 | | Neal A. McCaleb | July 4, 2001 | January 6, 2003 | Chickasaw | |
| acting | | Aurene M. Martin | January 6, 2003 | February 2, 2004 | Bad River Chippewa | |
| 9 | | Dave Anderson | February 2, 2004 | February 12, 2005 | Lac Court Oreille Chippewa | |
| acting | | Jim Cason | February 12, 2005 | March 5, 2007 | "non-Indian" | |
| 10 | | Carl J. Artman | March 8, 2007 | May 23, 2008 | Oneida | |
| acting | | George T. Skibine | May 23, 2008 | January 20, 2009 | Osage | |
| 11 | | Larry Echo Hawk | May 22, 2009 | April 27, 2012 | Pawnee | |
| acting | | Donald "Del" Laverdure | April 27, 2012 | October 9, 2012 | Crow | |
| 12 | | Kevin K. Washburn | October 9, 2012 | December 31, 2015 | Chickasaw | |
| acting | | Lawrence S. Roberts | January 1, 2016 | January 20, 2017 | Oneida | |
| acting | | Michael S. Black | January 20, 2017 | June 11, 2017 | Oglala Sioux | |
| acting | | John Tahsuda | September 3, 2017 | July 9, 2018 | Kiowa | |
| 13 | | Tara Sweeney | July 9, 2018 | January 20, 2021 | Inupiat | |
| acting | | Darryl LaCounte | January 21, 2021 | September 7, 2021 | Turtle Mountain Chippewa | |
| 14 | | Bryan Newland | September 8, 2021 | January 20, 2025 | Ojibwe | |
| acting | | Bryan Mercier | January 20, 2025 | March 18, 2025 | Grand Ronde | |
| acting | | Scott Davis | March 18, 2025 | September 3, 2025 | Standing Rock Sioux | |
| acting | | Janel Broderick | September 3, 2025 | October 9, 2025 | "non-Indian" | |
| 15 | | William Kirkland | October 9, 2025 | Present | Navajo | |

Table notes:

== Deputy commissioners and bureau directors ==
=== Deputy commissioners ===
Deputy commissioners were assistants to the assistant secretary of the interior for Indian affairs from 1981 to 2003.

=== Bureau directors ===
Bureau directors are assistants to the assistant secretary of the interior for Indian affairs since 2003.

| No. | Image | BIA Director | Term started | Term ended | Affiliation | Refs. |
| 1 | | Terry Virden | July 1, 2002 | 2004 | White Earth Chippewa | |
| 2 | | Brian Pogue | May 27, 2004 | 2005 | Cherokee | |
| 3 | | William Patrick Ragsdale | February 13, 2005 | 2007 | Cherokee | |
| 4 | | Jerold L. Gidner | September 17, 2007 | 2010 | Sault Chippewa | |
| 5 | | Michael S. Black | April 25, 2010 | November 2016 | Oglala Sioux | |
| 6 | | Weldon "Bruce" Loudermilk | 2016 | September 2017 | Fort Peck | |
| 7 | | Bryan C. Rice | October 16, 2017 | 2018 | Cherokee | |
| 8 | | Darryl LaCounte | April 28, 2019 | September 30, 2024 | Turtle Mountain Chippewa | |
| 9 | | Bryan Mercier | September 30, 2024 | Present | Grand Ronde | |

== See also ==
- Title 25 of the Code of Federal Regulations
- Aboriginal Affairs and Northern Development Canada
- Administration for Native Americans
- American Indian Movement
- British Indian Department, during American Revolution
- Bureau of Indian Affairs Police
- Confederate States Bureau of Indian Affairs
- Commission of Indian Affairs, state equivalents of the federal Bureau
- Indian agent
- Indian Claims Commission
- Indian reservations
- National Indian Gaming Commission
- Outline of United States federal Indian law and policy
