= Modern social statistics of Native Americans =

Modern social statistics of Native Americans serve as defining characteristics of Native American life, and can be compared to the average United States citizens’ social statistics. Areas from their demographics and economy to health standards, drug and alcohol use, and land use and ownership all lead to a better understanding of Native American life. Health standards for Native Americans have notable disparities from that of all United States racial and ethnic groups. They have higher rates of disease, higher death rates, and a lack of medical coverage.

These health issues are matched by illegal drug abuse; abuse levels are higher than any other demographic group in the United States. Methamphetamine abuse on reservations was a particular area of concern for tribal and federal governments in the 2000s.

== General demographics ==
Native American population demographics are studied by the federal government in conjunction with the Native Alaskan population. According to 2008 US Census projections, those who are Native American and Alaska Natives alone number 3.08 million of the total US population of 304 million, or 1.01 percent of the nation's entire population. Those who are Native American alone or in combination with other races measure as 4.86 million individuals, or 1.60 percent of the nation's entire population. The Native population continues to grow yearly. The Census Bureau projects that American Indian and Alaska Natives will reach 5 million individuals by 2065.

At the present time there are 574 federally recognized tribes. The population of Native Americans however extends beyond those with this federal recognition. Certain tribes have much larger population bases than others. The United States Census has documented 1.93 million individuals that are American Indian or Alaskan Native alone (not in combination with other races) with specified tribes. The tribe with the largest population base, for 2008, was the tribe of Navajo people with 307,555 individuals. The Cherokee tribe had the second largest population, with 262,224 individuals. Follow in third and fourth are the Sioux tribe and Chippewa tribe with 114,047 individuals and 107,322 individuals, respectively. By 2020, Aztecs were the largest ethnic group in the Native American category, numbering 378,122 individuals. The remainder of the Native American tribes have populations below one hundred thousand. This does not account for those who do not have specified tribes or are of multiple races.

The distribution of age of Native Americans and Alaskan Natives differs from the general population of the United States, according to 2008 Census data. Of those who are strictly Native American or Alaskan Native, 28.3% are below the age of 18. 64.3% are between 18 and 64 years of age, while the remaining 7.4% are 65 years of age and older. This is a notably younger population than the overall population. The median age of Native Americans and Alaskan Native is 31.2, while the male median age is 30.0 and female median age is 32.8.

Native Americans and Alaskan Natives also differ in their household composition. Of the 795,764 documented households 68.5% are family households with the remaining 31.5% non family households. The 545,403 family households are divided between married-couple families, male-headed households, and female-headed households. Over half, 58.9% specifically, are married-couple families. Male-headed households are 10.8% of family households, while female-headed households are 30.3% of family households. Alternatively, non family households are constituted of those living alone and householders living with non family. Of the 250,361 non family households, 80.0% are living alone and 20.0% are non family not living alone.

== Economy and social status ==
The United States is home to 3.1 million Native Americans. In comparison to the rest of the population, this number is a very small amount (only .9%). American Indians have historically lived in extreme poverty. With the rise of Indian gaming enterprises, the problem of poverty may have been variously addressed in select areas. Yet, while Native Americans have begun to take more control of their tribal economies, poverty on Indian Reservations is still a major issue. The U.S. Census in both 1990 and 2000 indicates that poverty has prevailed on reservations; to this day, Native Americans have the highest poverty and unemployment rates in the United States. The poverty rate of Native Americans is 25%.

Incomes of Native Americans tend to be low, and unemployment rates are usually high. For example, the unemployment rate on the Blackfoot Reservation in Montana has been 69%. This is in comparison to the American national unemployment rate of 6.7% as of 4 April 2014, or even during the worst part of the Great Depression at 25%. According to the 2000 Census, Indians living in Indian country have incomes that are less than half of the general U.S. population. The U.S. Census reports that the median income of households based on a three-year average from 2003-2005 was $33,627.

In 1989, the median income of Native American households was $19,900. Average income varies by tribe and can range from $29,211 in the Osage tribe, to a mere $11,402 in the Tohono O’odham tribe. Over 20% of Native American reservation households make less than $5,000 annually while only 6% of the overall US population has an annual income of less than $5,000. The average Native American family (3.41) is larger than the American national average, yet only 30% have health insurance. The quality of life for many Native Americans are often comparable to that of developing nations.

However, Indian tribes are becoming more economically independent in recent years. The impact of Native American gaming has been monumental, but non-gaming tribes have growing economies as well. For example, the Mississippi Choctaw Indians have incorporated industry into their economy. Automobile subassembly and plastic manufacturing are only two of the sectors in which the tribe is involved. Factories seem to contradict Indian culture, but ironically, industry helps culture thrive. By embracing industry, the Choctaw have been able to build a stable enough economy to prevent people from leaving the reservation and encourage people to come back, according to Chief Phillip Martin. Life on the tribe is more appealing because it is more secure. Jobs are readily available, and the tribe has revitalized public health, housing, and education. Past federal policies have continually been detrimental to tribal economies, but self-determination has provided tribes with the independence and sovereignty to combat a history of poverty.

According to the US Census, real per capita income has grown substantially in past decades. In 1970, the average real per capita income among Reservation Indians was $4,347. This figure grew to $6,510 in 1980, dipped to $5,959 in 1990, and grew again to $7,942 in 2000. However, the overall statistic for the United States has also steadily grown over this span of time. The total US real per capita was $13,188 in 1970 and $21,587. While economy on Reservations has improved, it is still significantly lower than that of the United States.

The tribe with the lowest per capita income on a non-gaming Reservation is the Crow Creek Reservation in South Dakota with $4,043, but it also has a very low population of 1,846. The tribe with the highest per capita income on a non-gaming Reservation is the St. Regis Mohawk Reservation in New York. With a population of 2,581 as of 2008, it averages $12,016 per year. The least successful gaming Reservation has a lower per capita income than the Crow Creek Reservation: The Texas Kickapoo Reservation, population of 423, has an average of $3,398. The most successful gaming tribe is the Viejas Reservation in California; its population is 232 and averages $28,128 per capita income. Therefore, population is insignificant when determining economic success. A better measure is geographic location.

Further breakdown of poverty rates show that Native Americans are consistently the highest among each race. Reservation Indians have a 39% poverty rate; Non-Reservations, 26%; Black, 25%, Hispanic/Latino of all races, 23%, Pacific Islander, 18%, Asian, 13%; and White, 9%.

== Location and lands ==
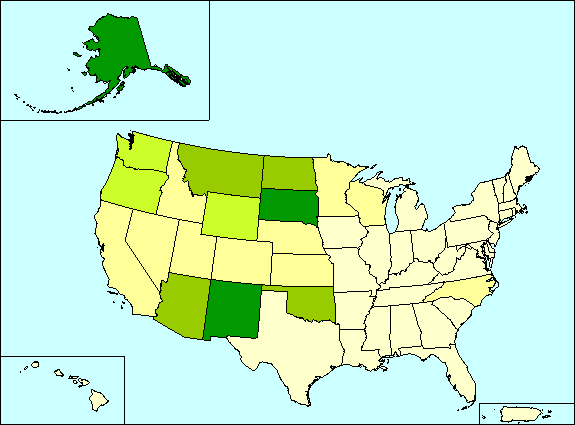
This map shows the population concentration of Native Americans and Alaskan Natives in 2008 by state, with darker shades of green indicating greater concentration.

The Native American population is not evenly spread across the nation. The greatest proportion live in the western regions of the United States, specifically 43%. The remainder live in the south, 31%, the midwest, 17%, and the northeast, 9%. This statistic demonstrates how the Native American population is concentrated into few general areas. This is further proven by the fact that over half of Native Americans live within ten states. In 2000, the states with the largest Native American populations were California, Oklahoma, Arizona, Texas and New Mexico. Twenty-one states have Native American populations which constitute less than 1% over their overall population, including states such as Pennsylvania, Massachusetts, and West Virginia.

Native Americans live in every different location, from reservations and rural areas to major urban centers. Reservations administered by the United States constitute about 56,200,000 acres (227,000 km^{2}) of land. This is broken into about 326 areas, ranging greatly in size from millions of acres to slightly over 1-acre (4,000 m^{2}). In addition to these federal reservations, there are allotted lands, lands under restricted status, and state Indian reservations.

The land-owning segment of the Native American population continues to increase, which in the later 1900s nearly doubled each decade. Private property owners include those who live in cities or urban centers. The two specific places with the largest Native American populations are the Los Angeles-Long Beach area, followed by New York City; each are home to over 50,000 Native Americans. Other large concentrations of urban Native Americans include Phoenix, Arizona and Anchorage, Alaska.

== Health standards ==
Native Americans require medical care and have health concerns similar to many other United States demographics. From all ages of American Indians or Alaska Natives, approximately 12% were found to be in fair or poor health in 2005. There are known health disparities between the Native American population and the rest of the United States. Reasons for these health disparities include "cultural barriers, geographic isolation, inadequate sewage disposal, and economic factors." However, there are many indicators that the health status of Native Americans has greatly improved in the previous decades.

Native American tribes have received much needed attention from the medical field due to the increasing infant mortality rate among their people, while the American nation sees this demographic overall on the decline. The infant mortality rate of American Indians and Native Alaskans is 8.6 for every 1,000 live births. This is greater than the average infant mortality rate of all ages of 6.9, all measured in 2005. Native American infants suffer from Sudden Infant Death Syndrome at double the rate of their white counterparts. For congenital malformations and low birth weight, Native Americans infants suffer at a ratio of 1.3 to non-Hispanic whites. Low birth weight was observed in 7.3% of births in 2005. Also notable is the fact that as the age of the birth mother increases, the ratio of Native American infant mortality to non-Hispanic white infant mortality increases.

In 2005, Native Americans recorded 14,037 deaths. This translates to 438.5 deaths per 100,000 individuals. Within the United States region, Native American men have been found to be dying at the fastest rate of all people. The life expectancy of a Native American man is 71 years, six below the expectancy of a white male in the United States. Women fare at a similar level, with their death rate growing 20% over fifteen years of American national decline. The leading causes of death among Native Americans (American Indians and Alaskan Natives) are heart disease, cancer and unintentional injury. The rate of suicide is also a significant concern, as it is above the American national average.

Native Americans also face a disproportional share of certain diseases. Native American disease and epidemics are commonly thought of as being alcoholism on tribal lands and surrounding areas. Many other diseases, such as diabetes, have a prominent presence among Native Americans. Native American children, in 2006, received "the recommended doses of vaccines for measles, mumps, rubella, Hib, polio, and chicken pox at the same rate as non-Hispanic White children."

Out of the single race population of Native Americans and Native Alaskans, about 16.8% of individuals have a disability. The majority of those with disabilities are in the 18- to 64-year-old age range, though this is also the largest demographic. For those age 18 and under, about 6% have a disability. About 17.9% of those American Indian and Alaska Natives ages 18 to 64 have a disability. Disabilities are far more prevalent in the eldest age range, 65 years and older, but this is a normal trend due to the effect of diseases on aging demographics. Native Americans also have high rates of mental health challenges. For instance, "Native Americans report themselves as under "frequent mental stress" 20 percent more than other populations."

There are many other health behaviors that are present in different rates in the Native American demographic. Out of all races and ethnic groups, Native Americans have the highest rate of smoking. As of 2008, about 32.2% of Native American adults smoked. This is in contrast to a rate of 21.8% for white adults. The high prevalence of smoking is also present in the Native American youth, as 23.1% of the youth smoke. Additionally, Native Americans had the highest rate of smoking during pregnancy, at 17.8%. Smoking itself plays into Native American culture, therefore it is a challenging health concern. Other health behaviors that contribute to the current health status include the high rates of obesity and generally low rates of physical activity.

Studies frequently note “a frequency of poor health and limited health care options” for Native Americans in the United States. Insurance coverage is held by the majority of Native Americans, but 33% of American Indians and Alaska Natives do not possess health insurance. About 36% did have private health insurance to cover their medical care, while 24% relied on Medicaid provided through the federal government. In addition to these services available to all Americans, the need for health care for Native Americans has been addressed by the American government. Currently there is a division of the U.S. Department of Health and Human Services called the Indian Health Service. The IHS serves to provide health care services and administer various medical programs. Although this service serves many Native Americans, health care is still lacking for the masses. 33% of Native Americans reportedly did not have health insurance in 2007.

=== Substance abuse ===
In 2002, Native Americans and Alaskan Natives were at a much higher risk than other minority populations for heavy drinking, binge drinking, and alcohol dependence. A study carried out from 2002 to 2005 reported that 10.7 percent of all Native American and Alaskan Native age groups suffered from alcohol use disorder, whereas 7.6 percent of other ethnic groups reported the same disorder. Alcoholism is a particular issue among Native American women. General statistics indicate that Native American women drink less than men; however, specific tribal social norms and location cause this to vary among individuals.

As a result, fetal alcohol spectrum disorder rates are higher than the national average in some tribes. Among tribes in Alaska, the rate of fetal alcohol syndrome, 5.6 every 1,000 births, is nearly four times higher than non-Indians' rate, 1.5 every 1,000 births. Overall, 11.7% of Native American and Alaskan Native deaths are alcohol-related, which includes traffic accidents, alcoholic liver disease, homicide, suicide, and falls.

==== Other drugs ====
Native Americans are more likely than other ethnic groups to report past year illicit drug abuse. Mexican drug-trafficking organizations are the main suppliers of illegal substances to reservations in Indian Country and presumed growers of marijuana on reservations. Drug-trafficking organizations run by African-American, Asian, and Native American gangs and criminal groups also smuggle and supply on-reservation drug retailers with inventories of marijuana, ice methamphetamine, cocaine, and heroin.

The most commonly abused drug on reservations is marijuana because of its ready availability. The number of Native Americans seeking help for marijuana addiction increased from 1,119 to 2,147 from 2003 to 2007. It is a potentially alarming statistic in the face of declining rates of reported marijuana use among 12- to 17- and 18- to 25-year-olds nationwide. Recently, methamphetamine cartels have targeted Native American communities due to conflicts in jurisdiction between tribal, state, and federal law enforcement agencies that complicates the prosecution of methamphetamine producers and distributors. The resulting spike in rates of methamphetamine abuse and addiction has made the drug a law enforcement priority on many reservations in the American West, particularly the Wind River Indian Reservation of Wyoming, and the Crow Nation, Blackfeet Nation, and Northern Cheyenne Indian Reservation of Montana.

== See also ==
- Cultural assimilation of Native Americans
- Indian termination policy
- Methamphetamine and Native Americans
- Missing and Murdered Indigenous Women in Utah
- Native American boarding schools
- Native American disease and epidemics
- Native American identity in the United States
- Native American reservation politics
- Native American self-determination
- Native Americans and reservation inequality
- Navajo reservations and domestic abuse
- Police brutality against Native Americans
- Reservation poverty
- Tribal disenrollment
- Tribal sovereignty
