= Native American reservation politics =

Native American political issue

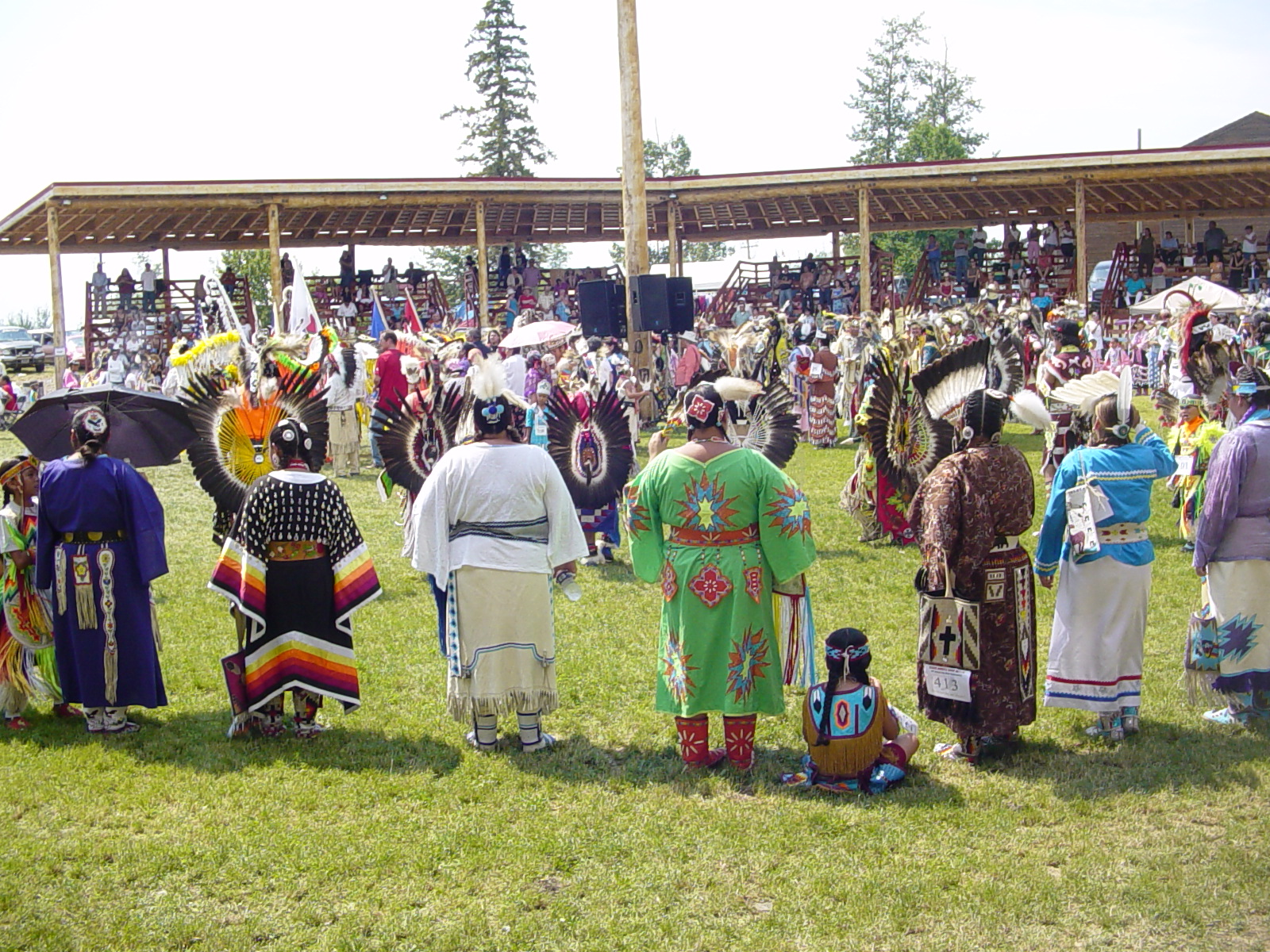
Pow wow, Alexis Nakota Sioux First Nation

Native American politics remain divided over different issues such as assimilation, environmental policy, healthcare, education, and economic factors that affect reservations. As a multitude of nations living within the United States, the Native American peoples face conflicting opinions within their tribes, essentially those living on federally approved reservations. Interactions with the federal government and the overall American culture surrounding them influence day-to-day tribal life. Native American culture as a whole rests between the divide of the traditionalists and those who wish to trade the old ways for improved conditions.

== Poverty and culture ==
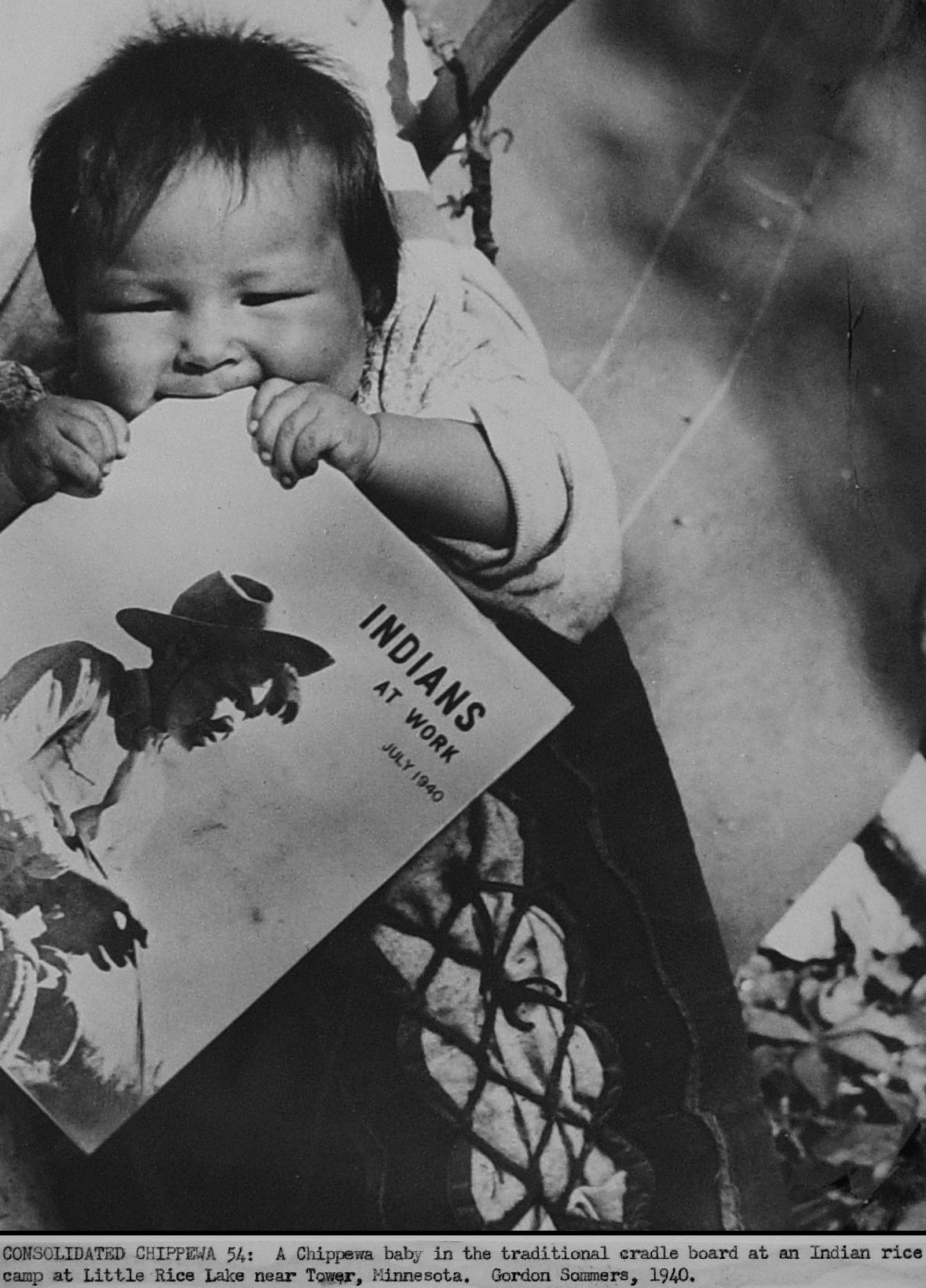
1940 government photo of Chippewa baby teething on a magazine titled Indians at Work

"Approximately 14 percent of all American Indians in 1980 lived on large reservations with reservation poverty of 40 percent or higher." Despite the conditions, Natives continue to live on the reservations because they see it as a cultural center for their particular tribe, value the implied sense of community, and receive government-funded benefits that they wouldn't gain otherwise. As a cultural center, the reservations serve as a holding place for the old ways of Native American customs. "In the southeastern or Woodland tradition, those old ways are most often connected to myths, stories, music, and dance." There are some unwilling to share the "old ways" with outsiders because they feel it is sacred knowledge not easily given away to someone not of Native lineage.

Organizations such as Native American Community Development Institute have been created "as an alliance of the major Indian nonprofits and several Indian businesses in the metropolitan area committed to community-building through sector economic development and large-scale development". They are devoted to the increase in economic innovation, and accomplish their mission by focusing on the growing number of Native youths and not placing a priority on traditional ways.

Native Americans suffer not only the highest poverty rates of all ethnic groups in America, but also the highest unemployment and disease rates. Substance use is common among the youth as well as teenage pregnancy and suicide.

== Indigenous land management and environmental concerns ==
=== Hazardous waste facilities ===
Structural violence plays a significant role in many hazardous waste facilities being located on tribal lands. With Native American peoples being among the lowest socioeconomic class, they are vulnerable to exploitation by these waste facilities and other private sectors. Tribal Lands are subject to different environmental policies than non-native lands, and hazardous waste and nuclear waste facilities have taken to offering generous stipends to tribes and Native Americans to build waste or nuclear facilities on their land. Some of these stipends can go into the millions which can be extremely tempting to tribes considering their socioeconomic status and lack of economic improvement. Because of this, hazardous waste management and disposal disproportionately affects Native American groups by nearly 1.8%. This has been referred to as something called a “Toxic Trade” and is comparable to bribery or blackmail. Many tribes are torn by these facilities - some encourage it because of the economic opportunities it would bring, others adamantly refuse it due to health and environmental degradation.

=== Environmental genocide ===
Environmental Genocide has existed for hundreds of years, appearing as settlers burning a harvest or slaughtering livestock owned by Native Americans. However, “environmental genocide” looks different now. Corporations are able to release these toxins into Native communities, groundwater, and soil under the guise of safely disposing harmful waste. The proposition of hosting hazardous waste management facilities or nuclear plants on native lands can be tempting to some tribal governments. Not only do they see economic growth opportunities or financial subsidies or returns, they also see opportunities for dealing with their own waste management practices, or employing their land. Bayley Lopez, a Nuclear Age Peace Foundation member, says “In the quest to dispose of nuclear waste, the government and private companies have disregarded and broken treaties, blurred the definition of Native American sovereignty, and directly engaged in a form of economic racism akin to bribery."

=== Resource mining ===
With the combination of these private waste corporations looking for cheap and easy land combined with some tribes being desperate for financial and economic growth eventually leads to a textbook exploitation ring. Native exploitation is not a new concept or phenomenon. Various treaties developed by collaboration of the US Government and Native Tribes were created to protect Native Americans, their land, their culture, and their health. However, these treaties were blatantly abolished after the discovery of valuable minerals and uranium on Native lands. In consequence, mining began to flourish. Once resources began depleting, mining slowed to a halt and mines effectively became abandoned. Despite mines being abandoned, many chemicals that were required for ore extraction stayed behind and continued to contaminate the soil and groundwater that Native Americans relied on. Some of these chemicals can contain toxins that increase risk of kidney and cardiovascular damage, as well as certain cancers and neurocognitive disorders. With this exploitation, comes activism. In 2007, the Skull Valley Band of Utah's Goshute Tribe was considering granting a permit to the U.S. government to build a nuclear waste storage facility. This specific band and their land was already home to several hazardous waste management facilities. Two years after the proposed permit, the US Department of Energy decided to scale back on their facility plans after Native advocates, public pressure, and the National Congress of American Indians adamantly condemned and protested the construction of the facility. This activism looks a little different when compared to typical activism where the oppressed groups are fighting directly against the perpetrators of the injustice. However, in this specific issue, the protesting often comes from outside sources (i.e. public pressure) versus the directly oppressed group - Native Americans.

=== Water rights ===
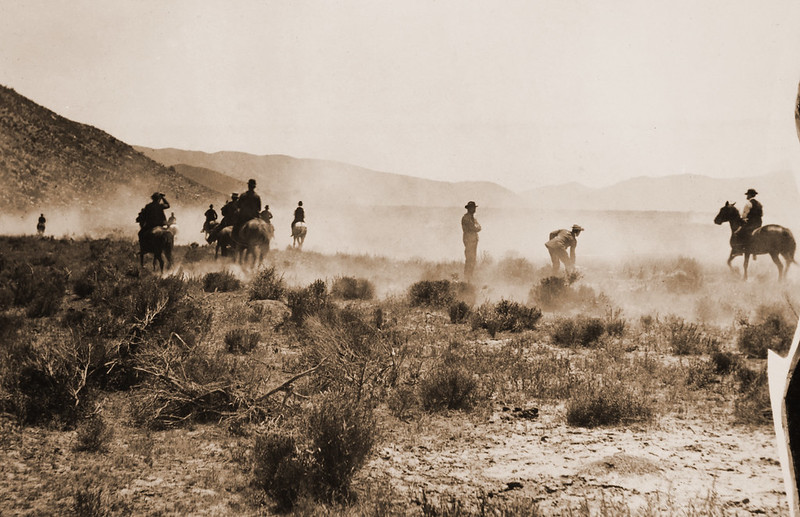
Reservation water rights were designed to ensure sufficient water supply for sustaining the populations of new reservations and settlements.

The water rights of tribes in regards to the quantity and quality of usable water is another subject of discussion, both on tribal lands and in the sphere of federal politics. While Native American reservations are entitled to a quantifiable water supply that is, at minimum, sufficient to sustain people on the reservation and in perpetuity, standards for the quality of drinking water remain ambiguous and undefined. The federal government position on Native American reservation water rights is based upon the policies laid out by the Supreme Court in the 1908 Winters Doctrine, which ensures that tribes have sufficient water for farming, fishing, and other needs. Tribes are entitled to ownership of sufficient water supply in the interest of irrigating Practically Irrigable Acreage (PIA), an allowance that emerged due to the original intention of reservations, as land for Native Americans to work to grow crops. In the context of the Clean Water Act and the Safe Drinking Water Act, federally-recognized tribes are viewed as states and are entitled to unlimited access to their water supply, but there is no oversight available to ensure the quality of the drinking water.

Due to the effects of hazardous waste facilities and the environmental degradation that has occurred as a result of resource mining, the water sources available on reservations are often polluted. As an example, the drinking water in the Navajo Nation is polluted with toxic uranium levels, and consuming such toxins often leads to illness. Further, the severe poverty levels on many reservations means that many reservation homes lack running water or may even lack sanitation amenities such as toilets, sinks, and showers altogether. For tribes without running water or limited access to sanitation amenities, disease and illness can spread easily.

Discussion of water rights on reservations often return to questions of sovereignty, tribal recognition, and basic human rights. Further, ownership of water can be seen as a cultural symbol for Native Americans, with their ownership of water becoming synonymous with the question of land ownership, and thus the loss of their water rights becoming synonymous with the loss of their homelands. While some tribes are able to profit economically from their water ownership, such as through leasing their water rights to other tribes or to surrounding areas, the issues regarding water quality remain a concern.

== Healthcare: improvements vs. shortcomings ==
One aspect of reservation life that discourages tribal members is healthcare, a service provided by the United States government for approximately 800,000 Natives. According to the Agency for Healthcare Research and Quality, Native Americans receive lower quality healthcare than other minorities such as Hispanics.

With the addition of the HR3200 healthcare bill comes the promise of better services provided for the Native people. There will be an approximate 13% increase in funding for the Indian Health Service. Dr. Roubideaux, the head of the IHS, praises this addition saying, "There is not a Native American alive today who has not witnessed the many shortcomings of the Indian Health Service", but as Dr. Roubideaux has said, "most of the failures were due to an extreme shortage of funds."

== Cultural barriers ==
According to Elaine Watson Jordan, Ph.D., the Native American education system is severely flawed with respect to cultural barriers. In Breaking Barriers, Jordan notes that "it is important to describe the complexities of culture and language to illuminate how limited standardized practices and measures might be to summarize the skills of many children from culturally and linguistically diverse backgrounds". She states that total "indoctrination to a new culture" is not the answer to a healthy education. Jordan argues that barriers must be identified to be overcome and uses the compulsory attendance law of 1898 as an example of overlooking cultural boundaries. "Guided by the belief that American Indians should be assimilated into mainstream society", Congress put into effect this law which would give the federal government the power to place American Indian children in boarding schools, "by force" if necessary.

=== Family values ===
In March 1974, the Department of Labor issued the results of their research concerning Native youth integrating American culture into their lives after leaving the reservation for educational and occupational pursuits. Research was done to determine the "occupational adjustment" of American Indian youth coming from reservations and seeking education away from home.

The study found that "the family is perhaps the most important aspect of the traditional Indian's life". Cultural values of Native American individuals are described as, "The traditional Indian's view of the world and his own place in it is one of living in harmony with nature".

In also studying the parents of the children observed, "they distrust the white man as one who wants to destroy their culture, and are likely to see the problems of the Indians as having been created by the white man". In response to this research, a counselor for a youth organization said, "We want to be assured that we are not misused at all, but that the project will be used in a good way for the benefit of our people".

Natives did not welcome the research because "there is very little history of community involvement" and trying to get Native youths who were taught early to be community-oriented is a difficult process in this aspect.

=== Alcohol in reservation life ===
In a 2008 study by the Prevention Research Center, "Native American youth were more likely to have consumed alcohol in their lifetime and been intoxicated in the [time period of the test] than Whites. Native American drinkers were almost twice as likely to have gotten alcohol from an adult and twice as likely to have obtained alcohol from someone under 21." From 1994 to 1996, the alcoholism death rate among Natives was seven times that of the nation. "Lifetime prevalence of alcohol dependence was high among all tribes (men: 21–56%, women: 17–30%), but one (men: 1%, women: 2%)."

=== Educational interests ===
In June 2004, 90% of high school age natives attended public school, although the dropout rate was the highest of any minority. Beyond the fourth grade, academic performance drops quickly. A survey of schools indicates the reasoning behind the dropouts:

- Student-teacher relationships (teachers do not care about me – 37%; teachers do not provide enough assistance – 39%; disagreements with teacher – 33%)
- Content of schooling (school is not important to what I want to do in life – 44%; school is not important to me as a Native American – 24%)
- Lack of parental support (problems at home – 44%; lack of parental encouragement – 39%)

Despite the dropout rate, some Native students have elected to go to college of their own accord, though the transition is difficult in regards to financing and receiving support from home. "Hispanics and Native Americans trail substantially behind blacks in terms of college enrollment, retention, and graduation despite the fact that they, like blacks, may benefit from Affirmative Action." A National Educational Longitudinal Survey revealed that in the late 1990s, the United States Education system served 1.4% of Natives. Also, Native Americans are the second most disadvantaged minority group in the nation when it comes to transitioning from single parent households to a continued education.

In her book Living Through the Generations: Continuity and Change in Navajo Women's Lives, Joanna McCloskey addresses a growing desire to receive a further education among her Native youth. "Younger generations recognize the necessity of further training and education to compete in the labor force, and high school graduation remains symbolic of the vast gulf between the elders who never attended school."

=== Achievement gap regarding language ===
To evade a shift to English, some Native American tribes have initiated language immersion schools for children, where a native Indian language is the medium of instruction. For example, the Cherokee Nation instigated a 10-year language preservation plan that involved growing new fluent speakers of the Cherokee language from childhood on up through school immersion programs as well as a collaborative community effort to continue to use the language at home. This plan was part of an ambitious goal that in 50 years, 80% or more of the Cherokee people will be fluent in the language. The Cherokee Preservation Foundation has invested $3 million into opening schools, training teachers, and developing curricula for language education, as well as initiating community gatherings where the language can be actively used. Formed in 2006, the Kituwah Preservation & Education Program (KPEP) on the Qualla Boundary focuses on language immersion programs for children from birth to fifth grade, developing cultural resources for the general public and community language programs to foster the Cherokee language among adults.

There is also a Cherokee language immersion school in Tahlequah, Oklahoma that educates students from pre-school through eighth grade. Because Oklahoma's official language is English, Cherokee immersion students are hindered when taking state-mandated tests because they have little competence in English. The Department of Education of Oklahoma said that in 2012 state tests: 11% of the school's sixth-graders showed proficiency in math, and 25% showed proficiency in reading; 31% of the seventh-graders showed proficiency in math, and 87% showed proficiency in reading; 50% of the eighth-graders showed proficiency in math, and 78% showed proficiency in reading. The Oklahoma Department of Education listed the charter school as a Targeted Intervention school, meaning the school was identified as a low-performing school but has not so that it was a Priority School. Ultimately, the school made a C, or a 2.33 grade point average on the state's A-F report card system. The report card shows the school getting an F in mathematics achievement and mathematics growth, a C in social studies achievement, a D in reading achievement, and an A in reading growth and student attendance. "The C we made is tremendous," said school principal Holly Davis, "[t]here is no English instruction in our school's younger grades, and we gave them this test in English." She said she had anticipated the low grade because it was the school's first year as a state-funded charter school, and many students had difficulty with English. Eighth graders who graduate from the Tahlequah immersion school are fluent speakers of the language, and they usually go on to attend Sequoyah High School where classes are taught in both English and Cherokee.

== Changing gender roles ==
"The Great Law of Peace included a section akin to the U.S. Bill of Rights, protecting the freedom of worship, speech, and assembly. The Cherokees limited town size so that all citizens could have the opportunity to speak in each council session if they so desired. Both republics were gender-blind, allowing women and men the same opportunities to participate and, if elected, to lead."

As late as 1989, some Native women retained the belief that raising families was their duty. One woman, Cindy Negale describes, "I prefer the traditional life because I was brought up very traditional by my grandparents...I am telling [my children] that Navajo is important." Also, she reveals that having large families is discouraged by the Indian Health Service because there is not enough healthcare money available for them. This opposes the Native standard that "prenatal values, integral to matrilineal clan membership, were expressed in pride in children".

As well, other Native women have chosen to decrease the size of their families. The grandmothers would choose a path of natural fertility and give birth until they no longer could. In the present day, most mothers decided to limit their families to three to four children. "No longer sources of labor, the children become investments during long years of growth and education."

Political opportunities have not completely limited the impacts of Native American women. Mae Chee Castillo (Navajo) has made tremendous strides for socioeconomic equality during the 1980s. Mae Chee Castillo is considered a Navajo heroine amongst many honorable tribal sentiments. These sentiments also include grandmother, community steward, and cultural preservationist (storyteller). Mae Chee Castillo is revered as a political activist for publicly "lecturing" and requesting presidential actions to sustain economic policies within Native American societies. Her demonstrations have set a political precedence for Native American women.

== Self-government ==
AIM flag

"The Iroquois and the Cherokees did not value the process of a democratic republic because it consumed their identity; they valued it because it protected their individuality. The political debate from the Cherokee town council to the Iroquois Grand Council limited by law what the group could do to the person." The Natives place a high importance on individuality in government and thus, the issues dividing them will be resolved using a democratic-like resolution.

Through the self-determination policy proposed by President Lyndon B. Johnson in 1968, tribal governments have the right to control federal programs directed at the Native Americans. Instead of supervising the tribes, the Bureau of Indian Affairs "began to serve". Congress then passed legislation recognizing the tribal judicial system and the decisions made through it.

Groups such as the American Indian Movement (AIM) support this movement because it allows them to act independent of the United States government while still securing their voting rights.

== See also ==
- Contemporary Native American issues in the United States
- Cultural assimilation of Native Americans
- Indian termination policy
- Methamphetamine and Native Americans
- Modern social statistics of Native Americans
- Native American boarding schools
- Native American disease and epidemics
- Native American identity in the United States
- Native American self-determination
- Native Americans and reservation inequality
- Outline of United States federal Indian law and policy
- Reservation poverty
- Tribal disenrollment
- Tribal sovereignty
