= Missing and murdered Indigenous women in Utah =

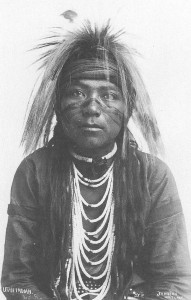
Utah Indian

The epidemic of missing and murdered Indigenous women (MMIW) is not exclusive to any region of the United States, but some states have a higher number of cases. Utah ranked 8th in the United States for the number of missing and murdered Indigenous women, with 24 cases since about the year 2000 according to a report published in 2018 by the Urban Indian Health Institute. The same 2018 report said the state's capital, Salt Lake City, was the city with the 9th highest number of cases of MMIW, but the Salt Lake City Police Department disputed the accuracy of the report and also disputed claims their department does not take seriously crimes committed against Native Americans.

== Historical factors ==
Utah was one of the final territories claimed by the United States during the expansion era of the nation's founding. This positioned Utah at the forefront of the interactions of colonial settlement and the native populations. When settlers arrived, there were five tribes established in the state, numbering to about 20,000 American Indians. During the colonization of the state there were many violent encounters between tribes and settlers, such as the Bear River Massacre, the Mountain Meadows Massacre, and the Black Hawk War

Utah has historically been primarily dominated by a large population of members of the Church of Jesus Christ of Latter-day Saints, which adds another dimension to the experience of Native Americans in the state. In the Mountain Meadows Massacre, members of the Church of Jesus Christ of Latter-day Saints dressed up as Indigenous people as a disguise before killing members of the Baker-Fancher party. The Black Hawk war was also between Native Americans and Mormon settlers from 1865 to 1867. Some of the general historical details of Native Americans in the United States are also relevant to understand in regards to MMIW.

=== Operation Relocation ===
Operation Relocation was in response to an emergency airlift to provide supplies to Native Americans on the Navajo and Hopi reservations in order to prevent starvation after a series of blizzards in the winter of 1947–1948. The airlift was seen as embarrassing for the federal government and prompted an investigation, the findings of which indicated that the land base could only support "35,000 of the area's 55,000 inhabitants". This "surplus population" theory was used as a justification to pass the Navajo-Hopi Act, which utilized job placement services to relocate indigenous people to US cities, including Salt Lake City. This shift to more urban centers exacerbated the issue of MMIW, as research shows that there are more recorded cases in these areas.

=== Residential Schools ===
Utah also had at least six American Indian boarding schools, where Native American children were sent in order to integrate them into Anglo-European culture. Additionally, there was the LDS-operated Indian Student Placement Program which was active until 2000. These schools included one near Brigham City and one in Panguitch, and some students who attended these Utah schools reported experience abuse and maltreatment.

== Complications in compiling data ==
There are many difficulties that make gathering data on the subject challenging. Native Americans are often mislabeled in race-specific statistics in censuses, surveys, and other types of data collection.

This creates a vast margin of error for research published on this issue, as Indigenous people are sometimes mislabeled as white, Latinx, or general classifiers such as "other".

There are also difficulties that arise from cultural factors. There is a statistically significant lack of participation from Indigenous populations when studies are conducted by the federal government, which could be partly attributed to widespread mistrust of government among Native Americans (see Native American reservation politics for more information).

=== Urban centers ===
Many research difficulties vary from Native American reservations to the experience of indigenous women in urban centers. In urban centers, there is no data collected from Indian Health Services for women who are not formally affiliated with a federally-recognized tribe. There is also a severe problem of underreported cases in western cities, as well as a lack of publicity. This lack of publicity is currently being tackled by activist efforts in Utah. There is often a lack of transparency between police departments and researchers. Utah police departments are often known for such obscurity, this is usually a result of a lack of coherent record being kept of MMIW cases. Several meetings have been held by government officials to discuss how to combat the lack of accurate reporting on Native American issues.

=== Reservations ===
The complex classification of tribal sovereignty in the United States makes research particularly difficult. Tribal sovereignty has also complicated the acquiring of health care for native American populations, this creates an obstacle for reporting violent crime. In recent years, there have been efforts to increase the amount of sovereignty for tribal governments over fields such as healthcare research and the prosecution of violent crime. Utah, alongside the federal government has had a long and complicated relationship with tribal sovereignty and the proper determining of jurisdiction. This is evidenced by controversies over extradition, as well as rights to the use of tribal lands for corporate use and for monument preservation. Complications in state and tribal relations surrounding sovereignty makes the reporting of missing persons and homicides cases far less reliable.

=== Numbers ===
A 2018 paper from the Urban Indian Health Institute claimed there were 24 deaths of indigenous women at the time. The Salt Lake City Police Department refuted that claim, stating that there were only 2 homicides out of 17 total deaths since 2008.

== Perpetrators ==
While most sexual violence against women is intraracial (committed by members of the same racial or ethnic background as the victim), Native American women are statistically more likely to be victims of interracial violence (committed by assailants of a different racial background), due in part to high rates of in interracial marriage among Native American populations. Whites are the most common reported racial group for rapes and sexual assaults against Native American women (57%), followed by Blacks (10%) and other races (33%), figures roughly matching the overall racial demographics of the United States. Commonly these perpetrators are not strangers to their victims, with 71% being reported as known to the victim. Among those known to their victim, 38% are intimate partners.

This high correlation between those that know their perpetrators is considered a reason that the majority of violent crimes among Native people are more likely to be declined by the U.S. Attorney’s office, as those that are familiar with their abuser can be more afraid of social repercussions that may come with giving testimony against someone within their social group. Another reason that these crimes are less likely to be prosecuted is that depending on the Native or non-Native status of the perpetrator, the state in which the crime happened, or whether the crime happened on a reservation or not, the group responsible for prosecuting varies. Furthermore, there is added difficulty in prosecuting perpetrators that live off the reservation, adding significance to the majority non-native perpetrators.

== Activism ==
There has been an active effort in Utah within the legislature and community to bring awareness to this issue and to work towards change. On a federal and state level, legislation, initiatives, and programs have been introduced to seek to address this issue. There has also been an active effort to raise community awareness through marches as well as published work. This effort seeks to reduce the number of MMIW in Utah and to bring justice to already MMIW. There is a lack of knowledge about this issue and in particular efforts to educate have been effective in reducing that.

=== Legislative efforts ===
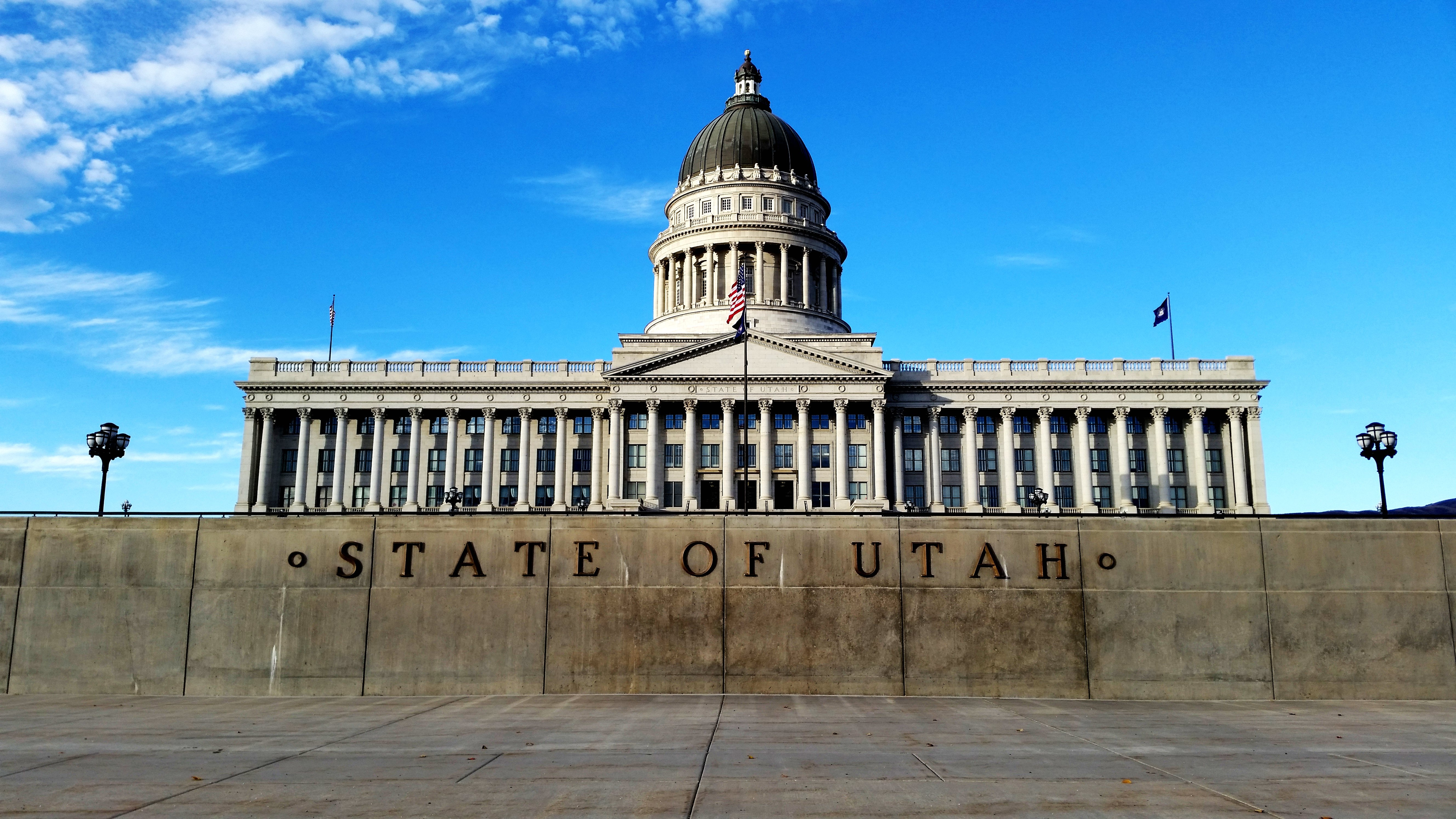
Utah State Legislature

Various initiatives and programs have been presented on both the federal and state levels to attempt and mitigate this issue. In 2019, the Department of Justice under Attorney General William P. Barr established a “National Strategy to Address Missing and Murdered Indigenous Persons”. The Attorney General stated, “American Indian and Alaska Native people suffer from unacceptable and disproportionately high levels of violence...women face particularly high rates…”. The initiative allocated resources from the Federal Bureau of Investigation to help aid in improving in immediate response, collecting data more accurately, and providing more competent analysis. Utah was among the first 11 states to kickstart this program, working closely with the Office of Tribal Justice and the Office on Violence Against Women. In 2013 the “Violence Against Women Act” was reauthorized. This reauthorization secured greater sovereignty on behalf of tribal governments, enabling them to prosecute cases committed against Indigenous women.

Utah also established a branch within the Utah Department of Health specifically dedicated to American Indian populations within the state. This branch went on to publish reports highlighting the “unmet needs” of native populations regarding healthcare within the state of Utah, many of which directly impact the circumstances surrounding violent crimes against Native American women.

The Utah State Legislature in March 2020 passed a bill requiring a task force specifically dedicated to addressing the crisis of murdered and missing Indigenous women and girls. The task force consists of members of the state legislature as well as representatives of Utah Native American tribes and victim advocate organizations. This task force will work to create “model protocols and procedures” to help address current and previously unsolved cases of missing and murdered Indigenous women within the state jurisdiction. This is the second legislative motion passed specifically regarding the MMIW crisis in Utah, the first being the designation of an awareness day for victims as well as Native members of the LGBT+ community.

=== Civil activism ===
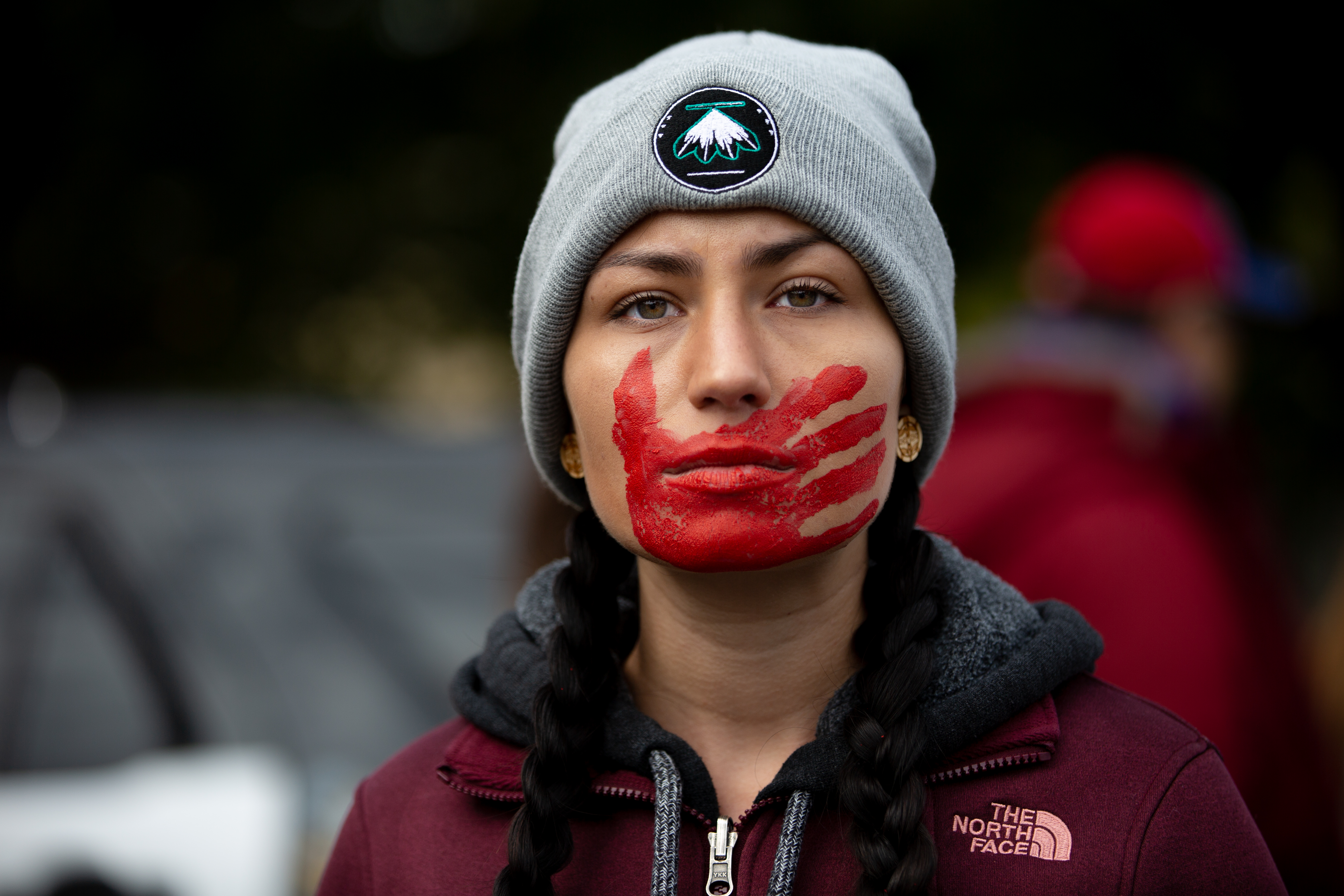
A protester at the Greater Than Fear Rally and March

In 2020 the activist group The Womxn’s March organized two events (in Provo and Salt Lake City) to promote awareness of MMIW in Utah. The Provo Women's march focused on three issues that are prevalent in Utah valley: sexual assault, access to healthcare, and MMIW. The section focused on MMIW included a speech giving statistics on the severity of the issue in Utah, music, and a performance by the Jingle Dress Dancers in honor of Native women who are missing and murdered. The Women's March in Salt Lake City heavily featured segments bringing awareness to MMIW as well. These demonstrations sought to bring more awareness to these issues, especially their severity in Utah. These marches mirror the efforts of those held across the country, such as the “Greater Than Fear” Rally held in Rochester where protesters sought to bring awareness and support for diversity and victims of sexual violence.

== See also ==
- Indian rolling
- Missing and murdered Indigenous women
- Navajo reservations and domestic abuse
- Indian country jurisdiction
- Reservation poverty
