= Navajo reservations and domestic abuse =

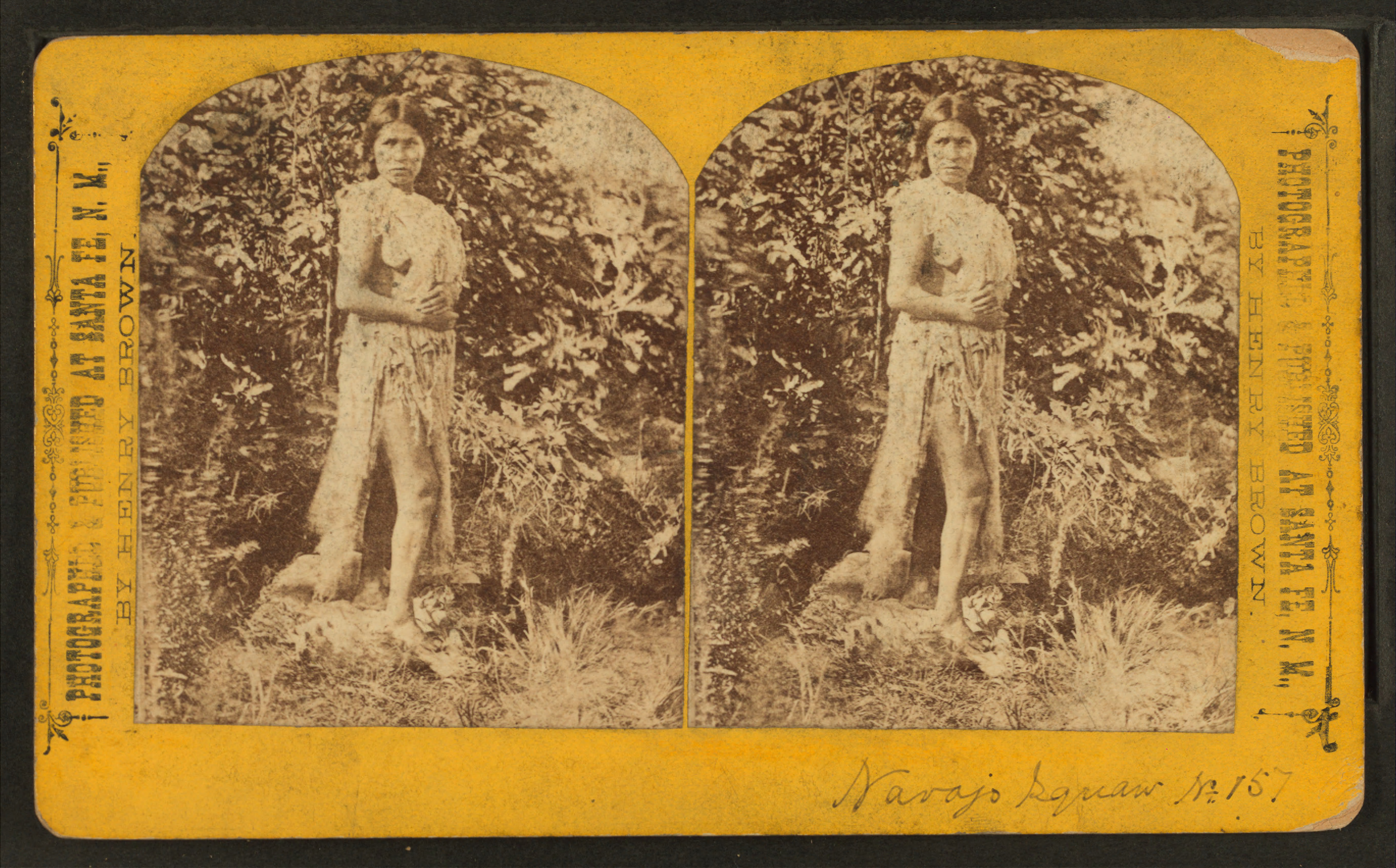
A portrait of a Navajo woman in the late 1920s. Navajo society was traditionally a matriarchal society, and remained so until the intervention of the United States federal government

Domestic violence is a prevalent issue dating back to the early 1900s on the Navajo Nation. Domestic violence is defined not only as violence but also any form of abuse in a domestic setting. Incidence on the Navajo Reservation though possibly under-reported is on a steady incline. There are many sociological tendencies of Navajo Reservation Natives surrounding domestic violence on the reservation. Domestic violence is correlated to substance abuse, social network, childhood abuse, governmental assimilation efforts and risk factors in adults. Influence on sociological tendency comes from both internal and external forces. Internally the viscosity of Navajo culture largely influences the behavioral patterns involving domestic violence.

Externally the US government influence is considered historically and contemporaneously; spanning from early government cultural assimilation programs to the existing relationship between the federal government and the Navajo Nation. Geographic influence is another contributing factor; including the lack of accessibility to the police and the large distances between the reservation and possible outside aid. Effective efforts against domestic violence are more recent as traditions have changed and become less effective in prosecuting perpetrators of domestic violence.

== Influencing factors ==
=== External federal and societal influence ===
Federal and societal influences should be considered separately when looking at historical factors of current-day domestic violence. Societal influences refer to non-governmental actions, while federal influences generally refer to legislation enacted that directly impacted Native American populations.

==== Assimilation ====
Societal influence on Navajo culture was largely focused on the assimilation of the Navajo into what was viewed as more mainstream American culture. Past efforts to aid or force assimilation societally include the use of American Indian boarding schools, which were used to force children to use English instead of Navajo, attend Christian church services, forgo traditional religious and cultural coming-of-age ceremonies, and generally move away from being 'Navajo' and towards being more 'American'. Another prominent coordinated effort to promote Navajo youth assimilation was the Indian Placement Program, operated by the Church of Jesus Christ of Latter-Day Saints from 1947 to 1996.

Research on the effect of forced assimilation has shown some correlation to rates of domestic abuse on Navajo reservations, although causation has not been sufficiently shown.

==== Legislation ====
The federal government of the United States has, in the past and to varying degrees, passed many bills and adjudicated many cases that involve the sovereignty of Native American tribes. Some of the intended results of previous bills have been to move Native American tribes to reservations and to define the limits of Native American land ownership, religious practices, and citizenship. The cases adjudicated generally involved sovereignty of Native American criminal prosecutions, the levying of taxes on reservations, and questions of property rights. In the late 1800s the American government urged Navajo's to appoint male leaders, directly opposing the Navajo matriarchy.

Paternalism was the primary political attitude when dealing with Native American tribes. In particular, the effects of forced movement from traditional tribal lands to reservations, the removal of native children from homes, and federal action that prevented tribal sovereignty when attempting to deal with criminal cases were some of the biggest sources of conflict with Native American tribes. The relationship between paternalism and increasing rates of domestic abuse, poverty, alcoholism, and many other additional variables has been studied for decades, with mixed results.

=== Geographic and economic influence ===
Morongo Casino Resort and Spa. Many Native American tribes have casinos located within their borders, but they are rarely truly profitable to the tribes as a whole.

The physical isolation and high levels of poverty on many reservations could be contributors to the high levels of domestic abuse on Navajo reservations. Additionally, the act of leaving a reservation, whether to seek help for abuse, find employment, or other reasons, can carry a stigma in some Native American cultures.

==== Poverty on the reservation ====
Extreme poverty has endured on most Native American reservations for decades. The high levels of economic instability could contribute to the low rate of seeking help off of the reservation. There have also been correlations shown between the level of poverty on reservations and increased levels of single motherhood and divorce, both of which have been shown to correlate to increased risk of domestic violence.

==== Geography ====
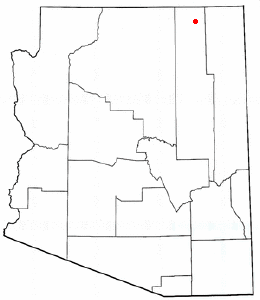
Located well behind the borders of the Navajo Nation, Kayenta is a small, isolated town. Similar to many other towns on the Navajo Nation, the isolation can make accessing help for domestic abuse more difficult

Federal boarding schools were seen by federal programs as easier paths to education and assimilation because of the geographic distance between villages on the reservation. Modern geographic influence relies on the colonialist influence that resulted in families splitting off and allowing more distance between communities. Distance between communities factors into the rates at which abused children are relocated and access to the criminal justice system and other aid provided on the reservation. The town Kayenta for example, though a population of above 15,000, has just 5 police officers patrolling all of its 4100 square miles; the nearest shelter to a rural family is over 100 miles away, and is currently full.

=== Viscous internal cultural influence ===
Traditional Navajo culture has experienced decline in the 20th and 21st centuries; as federal influence increased, the traditional practices of Navajo culture declined. Domestic violence in the Navajo culture was observed rarely and dealt with immediately. In the case of wife battery the woman's family would reclaim her to her home and blacklist the husband until he changed his behavior. Such blacklisting was effective up to the 20th century because the Diné tribe was matrilocal. The matriarchal base of Navajo culture faced such great opposition by the American patriarchy that values were compromised. Generational differences of the Navajo culture have great influence on modern domestic violence.

==== Modern assimilation ====
Current assimilation practices have caused generational differences between Native American youth and people from their grandparents' generation. Original assimilation efforts in the United States included legislative efforts, forced separation of families, and mass relocation of indigenous tribes. Modern-day efforts towards effective assimilation are more focused on easing the transition between cultures in such areas as education styles, parenting methods, and job requirements.

Due to the differences in assimilation tactics, Native American youth are somewhat more likely to attempt to assimilate, which is seen by some from the older generation as leaving behind their Navajo culture. The vast differences in both the method of assimilation, and the attitude towards assimilation on behalf of the Navajo, could contribute to differences in how domestic abuse is viewed, and thus how it is treated.

== Incidence of domestic violence on the reservation ==
Domestic violence reported and recorded since the early 1940s has increased. The most common domestic violence recorded and researched is child abuse. The most common form of child abuse on the reservation is child neglect. Physical or sexual abuse of children makes up 10-15% of child abuse on the reservation which is commonly perpetrated by grandparents and young, new parents.

The demographic where child abuse is most common, experience high rates of unemployment, divorce and substance abuse. Children suffering abuse or neglect were found in large, socially incomplete families. Of maltreated children in 1981, 52.3% of them had married parents. In 1997, sexual abuse perpetrated against children by family members accounted for 78% of child sexual abuse. 78% of sexually abusive relationships involving a child, were of a male sexually abusing a female child.

In 1998, domestic violence between spouses was attributed to most injuries of women ages 15–44 on the reservation. Numbers of abuse perpetrated by wife against husband are not reported or recorded at this time, though 52.2% of women eligible for asking by a healthcare provider reported experiences of domestic violence in their lifetimes.

== Sociological tendencies ==
A lack of social network on the reservation is studied as the largest correlation to domestic violence. This lack of social network is due to geographical distances and social factors such as generational abuse and disconnect from or appropriation of historical traditions. Navajos who suffer domestic violence early on in life are at risk for adult behavioral problems, PTSD, and other psychiatric disease. Sociological tendencies have shifted from cultural toward individual, less attachment to society as a whole has led Navajos on the reservation to act selfishly instead of as a community.

=== Reorganization of the home and family ===
The Navajo way of life and property contrasts greatly with that of patriarchal societies. Before 1883, marriage meant that the spouses became one another's property and that the two were equal. Property was passed down by mothers and a woman could divorce her husband by removing his things from the house. The Commissioner of Indian Affairs created the Court of Indian Offenses with laws against traditional marriages, inheritance and divorce in 1883; by law, women did not control any of their birthrights. The male figure in white America also introduced a power struggle within the Navajo's previous matriarchal society. Men in the eyes of America should have control over their home, and wife beating became a normal way to exercise that control in the Navajo world.

The Navajo reservation by law abandoned their traditions and reorganized the family with male leaders who came without experience or knowledge, only the white male to observe. These men who did not understand how to lead were offered cultural solutions, but because these solutions came from the Navajo women, they were met with violence in an attempt to maintain control. The family was reorganized with a male head which diminished social networks established by matriarchs.

==== Substance abuse correlation ====
Substance abuse is heavily correlated to domestic violence on the Navajo reservation because the reformation of the home crumbled matriarchal social networks. Alcoholism and other substance abuse acts on the reservation in place of fulfilling relationships. Though the numbers of substance abuse indicate a risk of domestic violence perpetrated by the substance abuser the abuse of alcohol is a tendency adapted for the same reasons domestic violence is perpetrated. There is no association between substance abuse and domestic abuse, only correlation of risk.

=== Post-assimilation tendency ===
The traditional Navajo culture in which the matriarchal figure guided was and is very open to assimilating with the culture of the United States. Soldiers were blessed when they went off to war and children were sent off to boarding schools, returning to the reservation detached from their born cultural identity.

==== WWII veterans ====
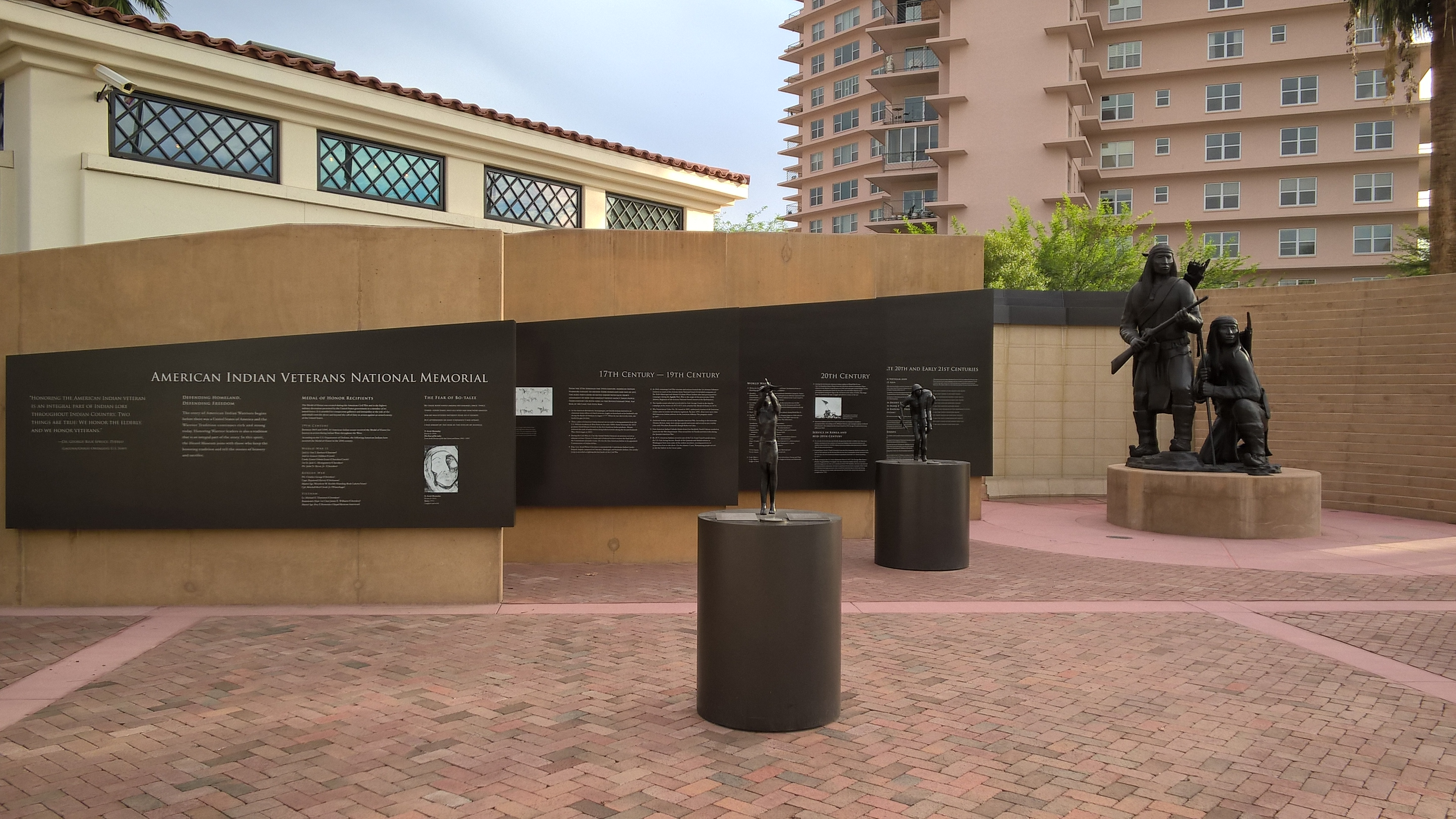
American Indian Veterans National Memorial, at the Heard Museum in Phoenix Arizona. Many Native American tribes made notable contributions to the U.S. war effort during World War 2, particularly the Navajo. https://heard.org/exhibits/veterans-memorial/

In World War II, the Navajo men did not hold resentment toward military service as did their Zuni counterparts. Navajo men went through ritual the Blessing way before serving in World War II and in service these men did not internalize responsibility to observe rituals or contact home consistently. These men coming home were welcomed with three rituals, the Blessing way, the Enemy way and sweat bathing. These blessings were acted to keep the veterans safe, but not to welcome these men home. Reservation natives who never left the reservation were somewhat resentful, encouraging the veterans upon returning to go learn more of white American culture rather than lead the people on the reservation.

The Navajo veterans had been subject to a life where men were the leading figure, a prominent influence on their lack of internalization for their culture. When these men came home they were observably different, leading the veteran's families and elders to accept the differences and not attempt to change the veterans. Instead these veterans were not asked to lead but to leave.

==== Federal boarding school attendees ====
Federal boarding schools located off the reservation beginning in the 1940s were, similarly to veteran's experiences, a militaristic environment. Girls were renamed and spoken to in English, and they were not allowed to claim Navajo as their religion, but were expected to choose Mormonism, Catholic, or Christian Reformed. All traditional culture was expelled and violated; personal modesty was violated with communal showers and crowded living conditions.

Parental visits were also not allowed because of the possible disturbance to the education. There were other boarding schools not considered federal where Navajo culture was not attacked as harshly, but these schools were smaller and had less attendance. Time spent in boarding schools is directly related to a Navajo woman's self esteem; the more time spent in boarding schools, the less a Navajo woman would feel confident in her position.

The Navajo culture was also less connected to those who spent a large time in boarding schools; schools which attendance could be forced until 1978 with the Indian Child Welfare Act. These schools disconnected Navajos from Navajo and American Anglo Society. With little to no experience with traditional Navajo culture, adults coming back to the reservation from school experienced a lack of ethnic identity. Generational disruption and lack of social networks, correlating to domestic violence, resulted from the lack of ethnic identity.

=== Cultural appropriation ===
Hózhó, a Navajo word, roughly translates to beauty in English but in the Navajo culture means the balance between opposites. Hózhó is the core of Navajo life and is responsible for everything. As relationships changed on the Navajo reservation and abuse became more prevalent of an issue, women in these relationships do not leave because of the shame associated with divorce and their understanding of Hózhó. Divorce is shameful in the eyes of Navajo culture, as expressed by many oral traditions including Diné Bahaneʼ, the lesson of the environment and the lessons of Kinaáldá. These stories and lessons therein were presumably harmonious with the way Navajo lived in a culture where man and woman were celebrated for their differences and their interdependence.

The importance of Kinaáldá, the coming of age of a young woman, was great with bestowing and explaining the responsibility of being a woman. Cultural appropriation of Kinaáldá is common as perpetrators of sexual abuse, men most commonly related to the woman coming of age, use this ritual as justification of their trespasses, claiming that the cultural understanding is that the young woman is now sexually available and sexually responsible. Male adulterers perpetrating sexual abuse against their sister-in-laws or stepdaughters appropriate the traditional marriage ladder that states a sister or daughter of a man's wife would be the next to marry him if his wife died.

These appropriations by male perpetrators are most common; inciting that whoever is receiving the sexual forward deserves it according to Navajo cultural traditions. Women in houses where domestic violence is prevalent also appropriate the culture, ignoring traditional abuse consequences where the man would be taken and shunned by the woman's family until the man reconciled and only giving weight to the necessity of her husband taught by Navajo culture.

=== Domestic violence history and risk factors ===
A purple ribbon for Interpersonal Violence and Abuse Prevention.

Risk factors correlating to domestic violence are not unique to the Navajo Reservation. These risk factors include psychiatric disorders and behavioral problems, most of which are other forms of abuse. On the reservation males and females younger than 15 who experienced sexual abuse as children are more likely to be juvenile delinquents that breach regulations, are expelled, leave home, lie, steal, abuse property, attend juvenile court, be arrested and consent to sex as young adults; girls having extra risk factors including excessive drinking and ditching school.

In adulthood this group are at risk for suicide attempts, debt problems, and little to no personal relationships; for women the extra risk factor is excessive drunkenness. Psychiatric disorders that are risk factors for males include: antisocial personality disorder, lifetime drug use disorders, lifetime affective disorders; the females as adults are at risk for the same disorders as men and also lifetime alcohol disorders, lifetime anxiety disorder, and lifetime post traumatic stress disorder. The violent cycle repeats as parents without strong self esteem, cultural or social identities raise children with the same problems.

== Current activism and prosecution ==
Social activism for the case against domestic violence on the Navajo Reservation is published as news articles and academic research. People who are affected by and care about this topic include the Navajo Nation's 2019 First and Second Ladies, Phefelia Herbert-Nez and Dottie Lizer; researchers in Arizona, New Mexico and Utah; news outlets such as the Navajo-Hopi Observer and Navajo News Online; and national organizations such as the American Psychological Association.

=== Research ===
Research of sociological pathologies of Navajos on the reservation dates back to 1949, with research of domestic violence dating back to the 1970s. The majority of research involving domestic violence on the Navajo Reservation was done between the 1970s and 1990s and focuses on the impacts of colonization and industrialization effects on Navajo culture and family pathologies. Research today focuses on demographics where domestic violence is prevalent, in attempt to understand how to reverse societal infrastructures imposed on the Navajos to aid victims of abuse and works to educate the world on current states of affairs.

=== News reports ===
News reports to the Navajo people are significant in social activism because of the holes in prosecution efforts and apathy and ignorance of the people not actively fighting against the trends and risk domestic violence poses. News outlets reporting on domestic violence have in the past explained certain cases in order to establish a well known truth. Holes in prosecution discussed in a report from 2018 include the dismissed cases on claims of insufficient evidence, over 550 cases. The news outlets aim to hold the governments responsible as prosecutors against perpetrators of domestic violence.

=== Prosecution ===
Prosecution of domestic violence cases on the Navajo Nation are difficult due to the complicated system of laws that decide jurisdiction. Generally, felonies fall under federal jurisdiction, while misdemeanors more often are left to Navajo authorities. Currently it is believed that cases are under-reported to both Navajo and federal authorities, and rates of domestic abuse involving Native Americans as the victims are proportionally much higher than rates for any other race.

==== Federal due process ====
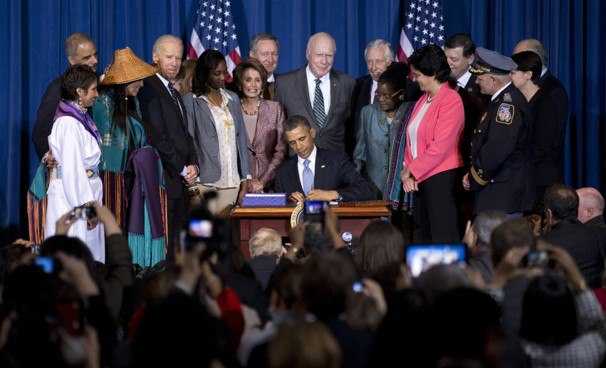
The signing of the Violence Against Women Act, 2013

The Federal Bureau of Investigation at the end of 2017 reported a total of 633 missing persons cases involving Native American women that remained open. However, due to the complex intersection of jurisdictions, many figures are likely under-reported to the federal government, especially considering that relatively few tribes have an official way to report these crimes to the federal government. In particular, fewer than 50 of the over 570 federally recognized tribes have official channels through which domestic abuse and other crimes can be reported to the government.

Under the heading of the Bureau of Indian Affairs, programs including Child and Adult Protection services and the Victim Assistance Program are offered specifically for Native American victims of domestic abuse, including spousal or child abuse. More generally, the federal government has enacted legislation like the Violence Against Women Act and Family Violence Prevention and Services Act to attempt to reduce domestic abuse and address its victims.

==== Navajo Nation ====
The Peacemaking Division of the Navajo criminal justice system was developed within the tribe in 1982 as part of a reform to establish Navajo common law with legal power and to place processes that mirror the pre-colonial Navajo justice system. This division allows and encourages self referrals without guilty admissions and holds strong bias against divorce. It also introduced the Navajo judiciary to remedies rather than criminal punishment. The Navajo Nation Supreme Court updated rules for domestic violence proceedings in 1993 in attempt to deal with domestic violence cases as quickly and fairly as possible.

The Navajo Nation Supreme Court put these proceedings in place specifically to maximize protection and reparations of victims of abuse. The due process does not accept intoxication as a defense for any perpetrator of domestic violence and has many remedies for specific situations or protections sought out by the prosecution or defense. The Peacemakers have little input from battered women's advocates, and have no screening process, safety assessment, planning or advocacy that could be beneficial in repairing holes in the system.

The Navajo Nation Child Support Enforcement Act required a court order for referrals to the Peacemaking department from July, 25th 1996 to October 4, 2012, when the Álchíní Bi Beehaz’áannii Act (ABBA) was enacted. Since 2012, referrals to the Peacemaking Division can be done by any agency dealing with domestic cases.

== See also ==
- Missing and Murdered Indigenous Women in Utah
- Reservation poverty
- Indian country jurisdiction
