= Methamphetamine and Native Americans =

Methamphetamine became a major public health concern among Native Americans in the 2000s. Tribal leaders and reservation police departments consider this epidemic the largest threat to public safety. They attribute to this particular type of drug, the higher rates of domestic violence, assaults, burglaries, and child abuse and neglect on reservations.

== Background ==
Methamphetamine's eastward spread from California included most of Indian country. However, due to the nature of the substance, it has been created independently in criminal labs on tribal lands and surrounding areas, as well. As in the case of the Wind River Indian Reservation, Mexican drug cartels specifically targeted reservations due to their isolation and complicated drug laws.

The United States federal government recognizes the inherent right of tribes, as "domestic dependent nations", to outlaw substances on their lands. For example, Montana legally allows the sale of alcohol as does the rest of the United States, but the Crow and Northern Cheyenne reservations in the state prohibit it. The jurisdictional issues between native and federal law created loopholes and opportunities for the cartels to begin business.

== Effects on Indian country ==
=== Crime ===
Reports of crime have escalated since methamphetamine's introduction. FBI offices located in Indian country estimate that 40 to 50% of the violent crime cases they investigate involve the drug. The increase is not solely attributed to Native American users. Traffickers, criminal groups, and gang members commit crimes against other groups and Native Americans in order to continue their drug distribution.

According to the United States Department of Justice, the crimes can be divided into three categories: personal crime, such as threats and intimidation; property crime, such as arson, theft, burglary, and vandalism; and violent crime, such as homicide, rape, and aggravated assault.

== See also ==
- Alcohol and Native Americans
- Modern social statistics of Native Americans
- New World syndrome
- Native American health
- Indian country jurisdiction
