= Reservation poverty =

Poverty on Native American reservations

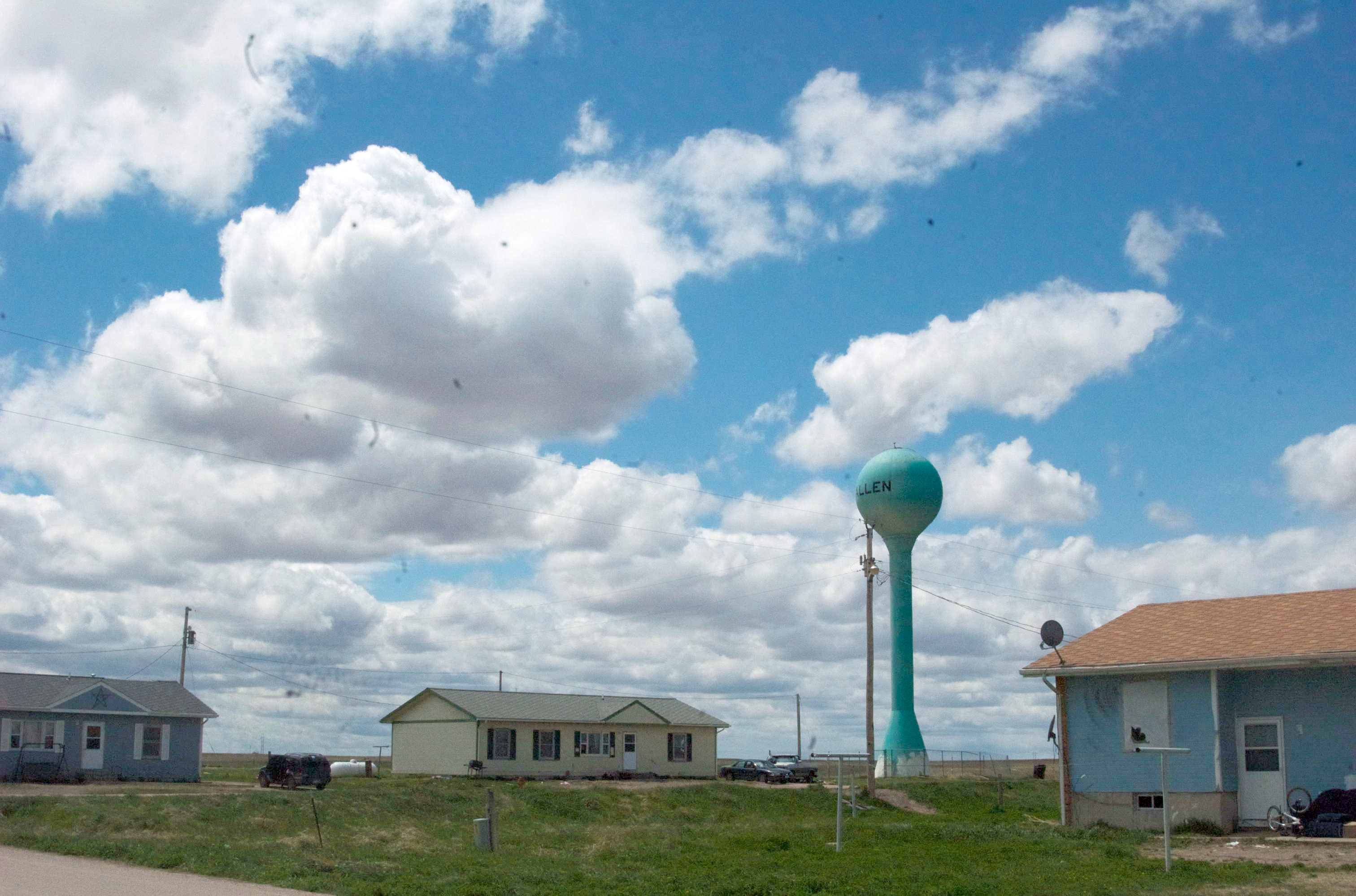
Allen, South Dakota, on the Pine Ridge Reservation, has the lowest per capita income in the country. The alcohol depot of Whiteclay, Nebraska sold over 4.9 million 12-ounce cans of beer in 2010 almost exclusively to Oglala Lakota from the reservation.

Reservations in the United States, known as Indian reservations, are sovereign Native American territories that are managed by a tribal government in cooperation with the federal Bureau of Indian Affairs, a branch of the Department of the Interior, located in Washington, DC. There are 334 reservations in the United States today. As of 2008, almost a third of Native Americans in the United States live on reservations, totaling approximately 700,000 individuals. About half of all Native Americans living on reservations are concentrated on the ten largest reservations.

Reservations vary drastically in their size, population, political economy, culture and traditions. Despite such variation, all reservations share similar histories of colonization, and face similar contemporary challenges. One of these challenges is poverty. In 2010, the poverty rate on US reservations was 28.4 percent, compared with 22 percent among all Native Americans (on and off reservations). The U.S. poverty rate among all groups is much lower, at 12.7 percent as of 2016. In addition to poverty rates, reservations are hindered by education levels significantly lower than the national average. Poor healthcare services, low employment, substandard housing, and deficient economic infrastructure are also persistent problems.

== Background ==
The official poverty rate on reservations is 28.4 percent, compared with 12.7 nationally. About 36 percent of families with children are below the poverty line on reservations, compared with 9.2 percent of families nationally. These figures are absolute poverty rates as determined by the US Census. In 2010, the poverty threshold for a family of four with two children was $22,113. Some reservations in Washington, California, Wisconsin, Michigan, North Dakota, South Dakota, Arizona, and New Mexico fare worse, with more than 60 percent of residents living in poverty.

Income levels on some reservations are extremely low. Five of the lowest per capita incomes in the country are found on reservations. Allen, South Dakota, on the Pine Ridge Reservation, has a low per capita income in the country, at $1,539 per year. Overall, the per capita income of American Indians on Reservations is half that of all Americans. The median income on reservations is $14,097, compared to $41,994 nationally.

== Poverty rates on the ten largest reservations ==
Reservation	Location	Poverty Rate (Families with Children)	Poverty Rate (Individuals)
Navajo Nation	Arizona, New Mexico, and Utah	46.5	42.9
Uintah and Ouray Indian Reservation	Utah	54.4	20.2
Tohono O'odham Indian Reservation	Arizona	44.3	46.4
Cheyenne River Indian Reservation	South Dakota	42.3	38.5
Standing Rock Sioux Reservation	South Dakota and North Dakota	41.2	40.8
Crow Indian Reservation	Montana	31.5	30.5
Wind River Indian Reservation	Wyoming	22.6	20.9
Pine Ridge Indian Reservation	South Dakota	52.8	53.5
Fort Peck Indian Reservation	Montana	58.5	35.3
San Carlos Indian Reservation	Arizona	52.6	50.8
National Average		9.2	12.4

Figures from the 2000 census.

== Deep poverty ==
The deep poverty rate of a population is the percentage of families earning less than half of the poverty threshold. For a family of four in 2010, the deep poverty threshold was approximately $11,000 or less than $3,000 per person. On large reservations, the deep poverty rate is as much as six times the national rate. On average, the deep poverty rate on the largest reservations is almost four times the national rate. A breakdown is provided in the following table.

=== Deep poverty rates on the ten largest reservations ===
Reservation	Location	Deep Poverty Rate
Navajo Nation	Arizona, New Mexico, and Utah	14.9
Uintah and Ouray Indian Reservation	Utah	4.2
Tohono O'odham Indian Reservation	Arizona	20.7
Cheyenne River Indian Reservation	South Dakota	14.6
Standing Rock Sioux Reservation	South Dakota and North Dakota	16.6
Crow Indian Reservation	Montana	9.7
Wind River Indian Reservation	Wyoming	13.4
Pine Ridge Indian Reservation	South Dakota	20.9
Fort Peck Indian Reservation	Montana	10.1
San Carlos Indian Reservation	Arizona	25.1
National Average		4.0

Figures from the 2000 census.

=== Changes over time ===
Historic data on poverty on reservations is extremely limited because of the tumultuous history of gathering data in these areas. American Indians were not included in census counts until 1840. Reservation-specific data was only produced following 1870.

In the 1970s, poverty on reservations decreased by as much as 20 percent on many reservations. In the 1980s, however, these gains were lost, and rates rose to levels comparable to those in the 2000. Through 2016, though, rates again rose, and rates in 2000 were very close to those in 1969. Explanations for these fluctuations suggest a need for further research, and careful consideration of how data was gathered, to ensure that figures reflect true changes in poverty rates rather than changes in reporting.

=== Changes in poverty rates on largest reservations ===
Reservation	Location	1969	1979	1989	2000
Navajo Nation	Arizona, New Mexico, and Utah	62.1	47.3	54.2	46.5
Cheyenne River Indian Reservation	South Dakota	54.8	47.5	57.2	42.3
Standing Rock Sioux Reservation	South Dakota and North Dakota	58.3	44.2	54.9	41.2
Crow Indian Reservation	Montana	40.0	29.6	45.5	31.5
Wind River Indian Reservation	Wyoming	42.0	35.2	47.8	22.6
Pine Ridge Indian Reservation	South Dakota	54.3	48.4	59.5	52.8
Fort Peck Indian Reservation	Montana	46.7	26.8	42.8	38.5
San Carlos Indian Reservation	Arizona	62.3	45.9	59.8	52.6

Historical data not available for Uintah and Ouray and Tohono O'odham Reservations. Figures from Trosper (1996).

== Historical factors ==
=== Early development ===
Following the American Revolution, the United States' strategy for native relations was to purchase Native American land by treaties. The United States also sought to assimilate Native Americans. The reservation system was created following the expansion of the United States into tribal lands. White settlers were considered unable to live alongside native peoples, and so various treaties continually limited the lands Native people were "allowed" to inhabit. This effort started under the presidency of Andrew Jackson with the Indian Removal Act of 1830, which created the first reservations. As forced relocation progressed, many tribes lost access to tribal traditional lifeways, which centered around community living and hunting and gathering.

During this violent period, tribes were often forced to move to geographic areas unfamiliar to them, most commonly from Eastern states to Western states. Reservations were created on lands that were deemed worthless to white settlers. Reservations were placed on lands considered resource deficient, unfit for agriculture or cultivation, and which were isolated from urban centers and transportation networks. Mainstream political discourse of this era favored removing tribes from areas populated by or desirable to the white population. During the nineteenth century, many Native American nations resisted forced migration by mounting upheavals which often turned bloody. Known as the American Indian Wars, these battles between American settlers or the United States government and Native Americans culminated in the Massacre at Wounded Knee of 1890, during which US military forces killed more than 150 Lakota men, women, and children.

=== Dawes Act era ===
As the white population began moving West, into the land formerly assigned to tribes, government policy underwent a transformation. In 1887, the Dawes Act was passed. The Dawes Act represented a shift in federal policy towards American Indians. This legislation divided tribal lands into individual parcels to be assigned to individual tribal members. The net result was more land available for non-native settlers, and less land held by American Indians. Policies starting with and following the Dawes act attempted to eliminate native lifeways, cultures, and communities. Political leaders asserted that forcing American Indians to hold private property would assimilate them into American culture. To facilitate assimilation, they were given food, housing, and clothing. The explicit aim of these policies were to forcibly eliminate traditional cultures, and "kill the Indian, save the man".

During this era, Native American children were removed from the home and sent to boarding schools, where they were given Western clothes, food, and education. They were allowed little to no communication with families, and siblings were often separated. Boarding school students were prohibited from practicing tribal traditional lifeways and from speaking indigenous languages. In several instances when students were caught maintaining Native culture or language, students were physically abused.

Forced assimilation took away the livelihoods of many Native people, without providing anything in its place. Tribal members were prohibited from making a living through hunting, fishing, and arts. Furthermore, native people who provided educational, religious, medical, and culinary services to their communities were replaced with non-native, government and Church-sponsored individuals. In the early twentieth century, tribes were further hindered by the Indian Reorganization Act, which imposed particular forms of governance and organization for tribal leadership. Traditional systems of social and political organization were replaced by forced constitutional forms and acted as a tool for further assimilation.

Forced assimilation policies explicitly aimed to forcibly strip Native people of their history, identities and their livelihoods. Because the land on which reservations were created tended to be barren, resource deficient land, there was little chance of developing economically viable agricultural enterprises. Prohibition of tribal traditional lifeways combined with the remote locations of the reservations created very few opportunities for economic solvency within reservations and for very few opportunities for economic interaction with white settlements.

=== Contemporary policy ===
In the last half-century, the principle guiding federal Native American policy became self-determination. The logic of this principle is to let tribes set their own policies, set their own visions, and determine their own futures. It was largely inspired by American Indian activists since the 1970s. Self-determination recognizes reservations as sovereign nations within US boundaries, meaning they are able to make and enforce their own laws and regulations, are independent from states' laws and regulations, and must abide by most federal laws.

Almost all boarding schools were eliminated and replaced with a combination of federally and locally managed day schools. Assistance programs aimed at forcing cultural change on tribal members were replaced with general assistance programs comparable to those available to the general population. However, by the time these changes occurred, traditional cultures had been severely and violently reduced, local economies had not been developed, families had been broken apart, and the stage for persistent poverty was set. Self-determination represented an important ideological shift in government policy, but did not change conditions of poverty and limited opportunities.

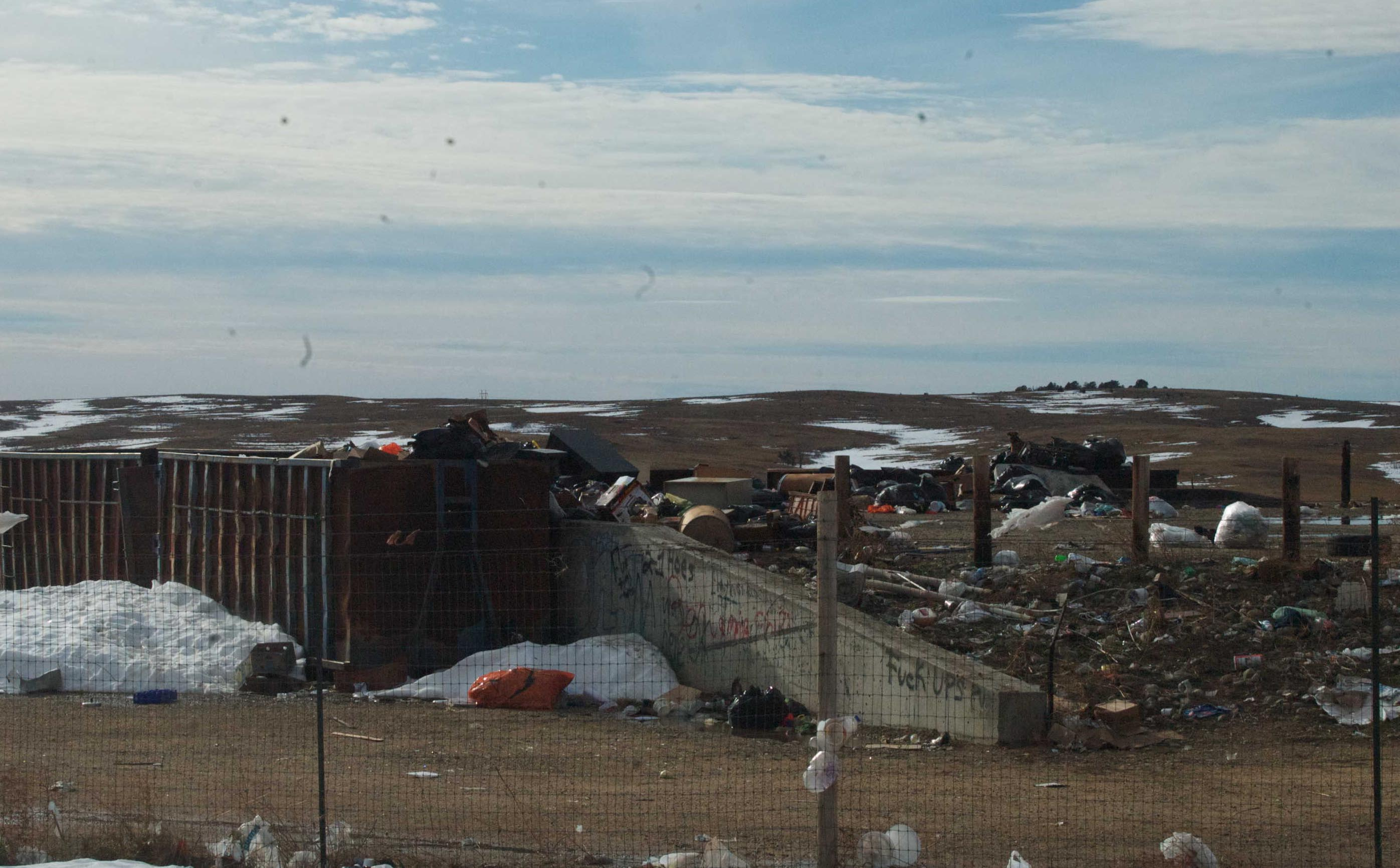
The large expanses of land on some reservations are used as garbage dumps for metropolitan areas.

=== Concentration Effects ===
The history of the reservation system has resulted in concentrated poverty. Regardless of urbanicity, areas of concentrated poverty tend to have higher crime rates, underperforming schools, poor housing, poor health conditions, limited private services, and few job opportunities. In addition, residents of these areas must contend with a geographic separation from areas of opportunity. Sociologist Gary Sandefur has called reservations the "first underclass areas" because of their concentrated poverty, high unemployment, and low educational attainment levels. Sociologist Loïc Wacquant has described reservations as areas of "socio-spatial seclusion," where residents are corralled and isolated, and that the reservations were created to immobilize native peoples.

== Employment ==
The official unemployment rate on reservations as of the 2000 census was 14 percent, but there is much variation. Reservations nearer urban centers, especially on the East Coast, tend to have employment rates similar to or higher than the national average. On many large, rural reservations, though, a majority of adults are unemployed or out of the workforce. On reservations in California, Oregon, Nevada, Arizona, Utah, Florida, Washington, New Mexico, Nebraska, Montana, and Alaska, reservation unemployment rates are above 25 percent. On some California reservations, the number exceeds 75 percent.

Out of the adult population without jobs, unemployment rates only include those who are both able to work and are actively looking for work. On reservations, a much larger portion is out of the labor force entirely, meaning they either are unable to work or are not actively looking for employment. Because of the severity of the lack of employment opportunities, many residents are not actively seeking work. People tend to hear of job opportunities through informal networks, rather than through conventional postings and applications. As such, an individual might be desiring employment, but not take the proactive steps needed to be defined as "looking for work." Some researchers have suggested that asking reservation residents if they seek job opportunities when they occur would be a more accurate measure of unemployment than asking if they had applied for work recently.

=== Unemployment Rates on the Ten Largest Reservations ===
Reservation	Location	Unemployment Rate	Percent of Adults out of the Labor Force
Navajo Nation	Arizona, New Mexico, and Utah	11.1	55.8
Uintah and Ouray Indian Reservation	Utah	5.4	40.1
Tohono O'odham Indian Reservation	Arizona	9.9	58.8
Cheyenne River Indian Reservation	South Dakota	8.6	43.1
Standing Rock Sioux Reservation	South Dakota and North Dakota	6.7	48.7
Crow Indian Reservation	Montana	10.5	38.8
Wind River Indian Reservation	Wyoming	7.5	34.7
Pine Ridge Indian Reservation	South Dakota	16.9	48.8
Fort Peck Indian Reservation	Montana	10.9	37.9
San Carlos Indian Reservation	Arizona	16.4	53.7

Figures from the 2000 census.

There are very few jobs available on the reservation. Schools are the biggest employer, followed by various public service positions with the postal service, commodity and provisions office, and tribal police forces. Troublesomely, the lack of quality educational systems and job opportunities has created a reservation workforce that lacks the training and education demanded by many professions. Because reservation residents have not had the opportunity to receive formal training and credentialing, they are often not eligible for what few jobs are available. Even tribal leadership and administrative positions are occasionally staffed by individuals from off the reservation, or from other reservations, because of required levels of training or experience.

Rural areas tend to lack jobs with promotion opportunities, and rural residents often must migrate to cities for employment and advancement opportunity. However, reservation residents rarely are able to meet the educational and requirements of jobs off the reservation, and in addition, often encounter discrimination from employers who are hesitant to hire reservation natives.

The lack of formally educated, experienced workers and entrepreneurs also opens reservations up to exploitation from outside firms looking to capitalize on the resources of reservation land. Although this land is often incredibly isolated geographically and absent of natural resources or productive potential, some areas do hold potential for development. Such development, though, requires a substantial amount be invested at the onset to build necessary infrastructure. Tribes are at a disadvantage, not having the resources or specialists needed. As such, they contract development out to firms off the reservation, who keep a great majority of the profits.

Although the tribe usually receives a nominal amount of profits, they lose the rights to their land and the potential for truly sovereign development. The rule of native lands by non-natives off the reservation is particularly prevalent on many large reservations in the Midwest and Rocky Mountain regions. Although the land provides opportunity for ranching, few reservation residents possess the capital required to raise cattle. Instead, they lease the land to non-native ranchers for minimal amounts. As the reservation residents do not have alternative ways of making money on the reservation, ranchers can drive the lease rates down to mere dollars a year.

=== Education ===
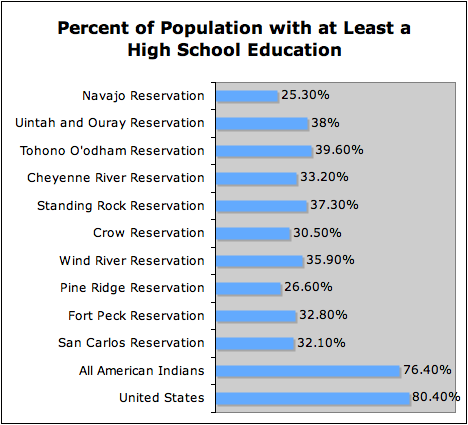

The boarding school system had the doubly negative effect of inadequately educating a generation of reservation youth while simultaneously fostering a resentment of formal education. Through the boarding school era, Westernized education was synonymous with cultural destruction. Even since the abolition of boarding schools, levels of formal educational attainment have remained very low. Overall, just over half of the adults on reservations have a high school diploma. Reservation residents' high school graduation rate is half that of all American Indians in the United States. On the Gila River Reservation in Arizona, which has one of the lowest educational attainment levels in the country, barely one third of adults possess this credential.

On reservations, more individuals have less than a ninth grade education than have a college diploma. More than 10 percent lack any high school education. It is not uncommon on reservations in California and New Mexico to have more than half the population with less than a ninth grade education. In North Dakota, Nevada, California, New Mexico, South Dakota, Utah, Colorado, and Wyoming, many reservations have over three quarters of their population without high school degrees. This is compared to 12 percent nationwide.

=== Banking institutions ===
There are few commercial banks or lending institutions located on reservations. Reservations are generally seen as very high-risk areas to place financial institutions, because of the lack of potential investors and overall dearth of economic activity. As of 2008, there were only six banks and seven credit unions operated by American Indians on reservations. Without formal financial institutions, many reservation residents are unable to save or invest what income they do have, and do not have access to loans for homes, cars, or businesses.

Due to the lack of commercial establishments, non-cash transactions are common on some reservations. Although a bartering system can function within the reservation community, it inhibits economic interaction with those off the reservation or on other reservations, meaning, non-cash economies serve to further isolate reservation residents from the national or global economy.

=== Geographic isolation ===
For employment, education, and financial opportunity, many reservation residents are expected to leave the reservation. However, reservations were placed intentionally far from urban centers, and many of the roads serving these areas are substandard. Many key roads were never designed or built for vehicular traffic. According to the Bureau of Indian Affairs, only 15% of the nearly 28,000 miles of reservation roads are in acceptable conditions and pass current safety regulations.

A food desert is described as a low-income area with a substantial number of people who do not have access to affordable and healthy food options. 23% of Natives living on reservations are food insecure, with some reservations having as much as 50% of the people living with food insecurities. This means that the reservations are suffering from low-income and low access to food. Low access is described as 33% or more of the population living in rural areas where stores providing affordable and healthy foods are more than 10 miles away from their homes. Another issue we see with this trend is that certain diseases are linked with food insecurities. If some of the closest places to purchase food only consist of processed foods, such as gas stations or quick marts. People are only able to access food that has high sugar and sodium as well as saturated fats, these options only lead to a higher risk of obesity, heart disease and diabetes. Which is already rampant in Native American communities.

Furthermore, almost a quarter of reservation households do not have access to a vehicle. However, barely one percent of reservation residents rely on any kind of public transportation. Although the federal government has made funds available to improve transportation on reservations, local transportation authorities have not taken advantage of these monies. These local authorities often lack the human capital needed to engineer and carry out improvements. The lack of safe roads and adequate transportation further isolates reservation communities and strengthens the neighborhood effects of concentrated poverty.

Isolation tends to lead to depression and poverty. With depression and isolation afflicting so many Native people, it is not surprising to see the rates for suicide and homicide correlating to the populations in poverty. The Indian Health Service found that in areas with high poverty rates, the percentage increases for suicide and homicide cases, the numbers decrease with a lower percentage of poverty.

=== Problematic behaviors ===
The rate of violent crime on reservations is more than twice the national average. Although not heavily studied, gang violence is a problem on the Navajo and Pine Ridge Reservations. Almost one fourth of a national sample of reservation residents report gang activity in their communities.

The use of drugs, alcohol, and cigarettes on reservations is also higher than national averages. This is especially true among youth, with the rate of youth drug use among reservation populations more than twice that of the general population. The suicide rate among reservation residents is also twice that of the general population, and suicide is the leading cause of death on reservations among youth aged 15–24.

== Government assistance ==
=== Types of assistance ===
Reservation residents are eligible for all federal social assistance programs, including Temporary Aid for Needy Families (TANF), Supplemental Security Income (SSI), and food stamp programs. In addition, Food Distribution on Indian Reservations (FDPIR), often called "commodities," provides in-kind handouts of food. This program is the result of treaties established in the nineteenth and twentieth centuries that included provisions that the government would provide food and shelter for tribal members. Each reservation has a commodities office, from which monthly food supplies are given out.

Unfortunately, this food tends to be nonperishable, heavy on simple starches, and nutritionally deficient, thus contributing to high rates of obesity and diabetes on reservations. Public assistance does not effectively reduce poverty on the reservation. Although it may keep many families from being completely unable to survive, it does not build economies, reinstitute cultural institutions, or create a source of pride for reservation residents.

=== Percent receiving aid ===
The percent of reservation residents eligible for government aid tends to be much higher than that of the general population. On the ten largest reservations, the percent of residents receiving cash assistance ranges from four to fifteen times the national average. In addition, a higher portion of reservation residents are eligible for Supplemental Security Income. On average, ten percent of the population on the largest reservations are eligible for SSI benefits, compared with eight percent of all Americans. The percentage of reservation residents eligible for social security benefits is comparable to that of the national population.

=== Problems with existing data ===
Relatively little current, valid data exists about today's reservations. Annual demographic surveys generally do not have a large enough reservation-based sample to present data. Researchers gathering data on American Indians rarely differentiate between reservation residents and non-reservation residents, even though there are huge differences in lifestyles and often much tension between the groups. Furthermore, the rural nature of many reservations, the lack of available contact information and telephone numbers, protective rules by tribal councils, and a distrust of outsiders present data collection challenges. Lastly, an overwhelming majority of research focuses on the Pine Ridge and Navajo Reservations, suggesting a need for more comparative analyses of conditions on individual reservations.

=== Government Assistance on the Ten Largest Reservations ===
Reservation	Location	Percent Receiving Cash Assistance	Average Annual Cash Assistance	Percent Receiving Food Stamps/SNAP
Navajo Nation	Arizona, New Mexico, and Utah	15	$3,429	27
Uintah and Ouray Indian Reservation	Utah	8	$2,475	11
Tohono O'odham Indian Reservation	Arizona	21	$2,858	35
Cheyenne River Indian Reservation	South Dakota	15	$2,755	not available
Standing Rock Sioux Reservation	South Dakota and North Dakota	9	$4,134	28
Crow Indian Reservation	Montana	7	$2,237	24
Wind River Indian Reservation	Wyoming	7	$2,418	11
Pine Ridge Indian Reservation	South Dakota	17	$3,033	34
Fort Peck Indian Reservation	Montana	17	$4,107	13
San Carlos Indian Reservation	Arizona	31	$3,089	34
National Average		2.5	$3,553	9

Figures from the 2000 census.

=== Local reform efforts ===
The federal government allows tribes some authority in creating their own versions of Temporary Assistance for Needy Families (TANF) with federal monies. Such programs must abide by federal regulations, such as the 60-month limitation, but may incorporate aspects of culture and tradition into the requirements for aid. Economist Elizabeth Zahrt Geib stressed the potential for tribes to define work for purposes of welfare distribution to include traditional tasks and arts more in line with native lifestyles before the reservation system was created.

The Tanana Chiefs Conference of Alaska and the Lac du Flambeau Bank of Lake Superior Chippewa of Wisconsin have already included hunting and fishing as work activities for purposes of welfare distribution. In addition, locally controlled welfare programs usually mean much easier application processes and increased accessibility to offices, allowing a greater number of eligible individuals to become recipients.

The amount of money made available to tribes is calculated from the amount that individual states made available to reservation residents in years prior. Unfortunately, many states did not educate reservation residents on procedures for applying for aid, meaning that the number of receiving individuals was less than the number of eligible individuals, and limiting the amount currently made available.

=== Anti-poverty programs ===
Across the country, individuals and organizations both on and off reservations are fighting to reduce the poverty discussed above. Most efforts have focused on gaming casinos, tribal economic entrepreneurship, and cultural revival.

=== Environmental protection efforts ===
Reservations in relatively close proximity to urban areas have become sites for waste treatment, storage, and disposal facilities (TSDFs), adding environmental degradation to the landscape of poverty. Living in proximity to high levels of pollution or industrial facilities has been linked to serious short-term and long-term health impacts. In what is perhaps the most negative use of Native American lands, the federal government has used reservations for nuclear testing and nuclear waste disposal. Uranium mining, uranium conversion and enrichment, and nuclear weapons testing have all occurred on reservation lands in the past century. After creating the Nevada Test Site on Western Shoshone lands in Nevada, the federal government tested over one thousand atomic weapons on Western Shoshone land between the 1950-90s. The Western Shoshone people call themselves the "most bombed nation on the planet." Similar activities happened on Paiute Shoshone lands as well.

For Native American nations, environmental justice on reservations is more than the enforcement of equitable protection of human health and natural resources, it is also a matter of tribal sovereignty, self determination, and redistribution of power. The field of environmental justice (EJ) focuses on measuring and mitigating patterns of disproportionate exposure to environmental pollutants and health hazards, has been a useful ally for Native nations in the fight against environmental degradation on reservations. Over the past several decades, EJ communities, researchers and activists have used varied methodology to measure the disparate siting and long-term health effects of locally unwanted land uses, waste treatment facilities, and other noxious point sources of pollution in relation to communities of color and other socioeconomically disadvantaged groups. Native governments on reservations have used their legal "Treatment as State" status with the Federal government to mount EJ claims with the Environmental Protection Agency (EPA) in several cases to successfully legally push back against pollution and environmental degradation on their lands . However, many Native activists argue that a seat at the table "does not ensure a comparable serving of the environmental protection pie"

== Influence of casinos ==
Indian gaming casinos are often considered a potential solution to reservation poverty. Because reservations are exempt from many federal and state regulations, including those prohibiting gambling, tribes are able to operate commercial casinos on reservations. These casinos can provide jobs on the reservation, attract tourists, and bring in money for tribes to fund education, health, and social service programs. The Ojibwe of Minnesota have built two schools, the Choctaw of Oklahoma have built a new hospital, and the Pueblo of New Mexico have rebuilt their water system, all using casino profits. Other tribes fund child and elder care programs, health services, fire and police protection, and housing development with gambling earnings.

Casinos also provide much-needed job opportunities on reservations. In 1989, average levels of unemployment on reservations was above 30 percent. In the next decade, that rate dropped to 13 percent on reservations with casinos, while remaining stagnant on reservations without casinos.

Casinos' impact on overall economic conditions, however, is limited. Through the 1990s, the number of reservation residents eligible for public assistance programs increased across most reservations. Although the rate of increase was slightly less on reservations that had casinos, the casinos were unable to reverse trends of worsening poverty. There are a number of factors explaining why casinos have done little to change living conditions on many reservations, despite the income they bring in. First, a relatively small number of casinos bring in the majority of casino income. In the 1990s, ten casinos brought in more than half the earned money, and 20 percent of casinos brought in more than 80 percent of earnings.

Those that are most financially successful tend to be small reservations with relatively few inhabitants located near metropolitan areas that do not have as high poverty rates as larger, more rural reservations, which hold a much greater portion of the nations' reservation inhabitants. Many of the reservations facing the most dire poverty also are the most geographically isolated, meaning outside tourists rarely travel to the casinos. Instead, they are visited by reservation residents. Depending on the profit distribution plan of the tribe, this can result in a redistribution of income from many to a few, and a fractionalization of the reservation population between those who spend at casinos and those who earn from them.

When reservation residents spend portions of their sometimes very sparse incomes gambling, casinos can serve to exacerbate rather than relieve conditions of poverty. This is especially true when a casino's income is sent off the reservation, as is frequently the case when tribal governments must rely on outside investors to build casinos. These non-native investors often take substantial portions of the profits for years following construction to repay their initial contributions. Beyond initial investments, some casinos rely on outside management companies for day-to-day operations. Currently, fifteen percent of casino revenues go to such management firms.

Beyond limited economic efficacy, casinos have faced criticism on cultural grounds. Some tribal leaders have raised concerns that gambling goes against cultural beliefs and values, and is not a solid cultural foundation for native economic development. Without culturally sensitive investment in education and job creation, they assert, conditions of poverty will not change.

== Economic development ==
Some have suggested that private enterprise originating on the reservation is the key to poverty alleviation. Once a critical mass of business exists, jobs will be created. By keeping the circulation of money on the reservation, economies will grow. Currently, there are 236,691 businesses in the US owned by American Indians and Alaskan Natives, most located off reservations. Although 1.5 percent of the population identifies as American Indian or Alaskan Native, these businesses represent less than one percent of all businesses in the nation. Native-owned businesses tend to be very small, with only 10 percent of them having any employees, and only 162 having more than 100 employees. However, trends suggest the number of natively owned businesses is growing. The number has risen 18 percent in the past decade, and native-business profits rose nearly 30 percent.

Some Native entrepreneurs have brought economic development to their reservations. Small businesses thrive on reservations throughout the country. For example, the Native American Natural Foods Company of Kyle, South Dakota, on Pine Ridge produces energy bars using buffalo meat and cranberries that are sold in gourmet grocery stores throughout the country. They serve as a model for other reservation-based businesses. An artists' cooperative on the Siletz Reservation in Oregon sells Native artwork and is staffed by young reservation residents, providing the artists with business and the employees with important work experience.

In some areas, reservation residents have developed professional networks to share resources as they develop businesses. For example, four tribes in Oregon created the Oregon Native American Business and Entrepreneurial Network, which offers training to assist tribal members start, fund, and operate business ventures. The organization has assisted more than 10,000 individuals since its founding in 1993. Unfortunately, for every successful business, there are many that are not able to sustain themselves, and many more ideas without the resources needed to implement them.

=== Alaska Native Corporations ===
The federal government has taken an active role in fostering business on native lands through the creation of Alaska Native Corporations (ANCs). These corporations, created by the Alaska Native Claims Settlement Act of 1971, were created to settle land disputes with Alaska Natives. Rather than creating reservations, the government divided Alaskan lands into corporations, each of which owns a segment of land on which tribal members reside. In addition to owning tribal lands, these corporations have a business relationship with the government, who can contract with them for any number of tasks.

Alaskan corporations have held federal contracts to deal with defense, sexual harassment regulation, and more. Such contracts have not brought substantial money or economic activity to Alaska. Frequently, large, non-natively owned corporations in the continental United States will subcontract with the Alaskan Native Corporations. Due to the circumstances of their creation, contracts with ANCs are free from much of the regulation conventional contractors face, such as requirements for competitive bidding and spending caps. As such, the subcontractors are able to avoid regulation, while only passing on a very small portion of funds to the native shareholders of the Alaskan Native Corporation. In practice, the Alaskan Native Corporation system has done little to reduce poverty among Alaska's natives despite its effort to provide tribes with opportunities for economic activity.

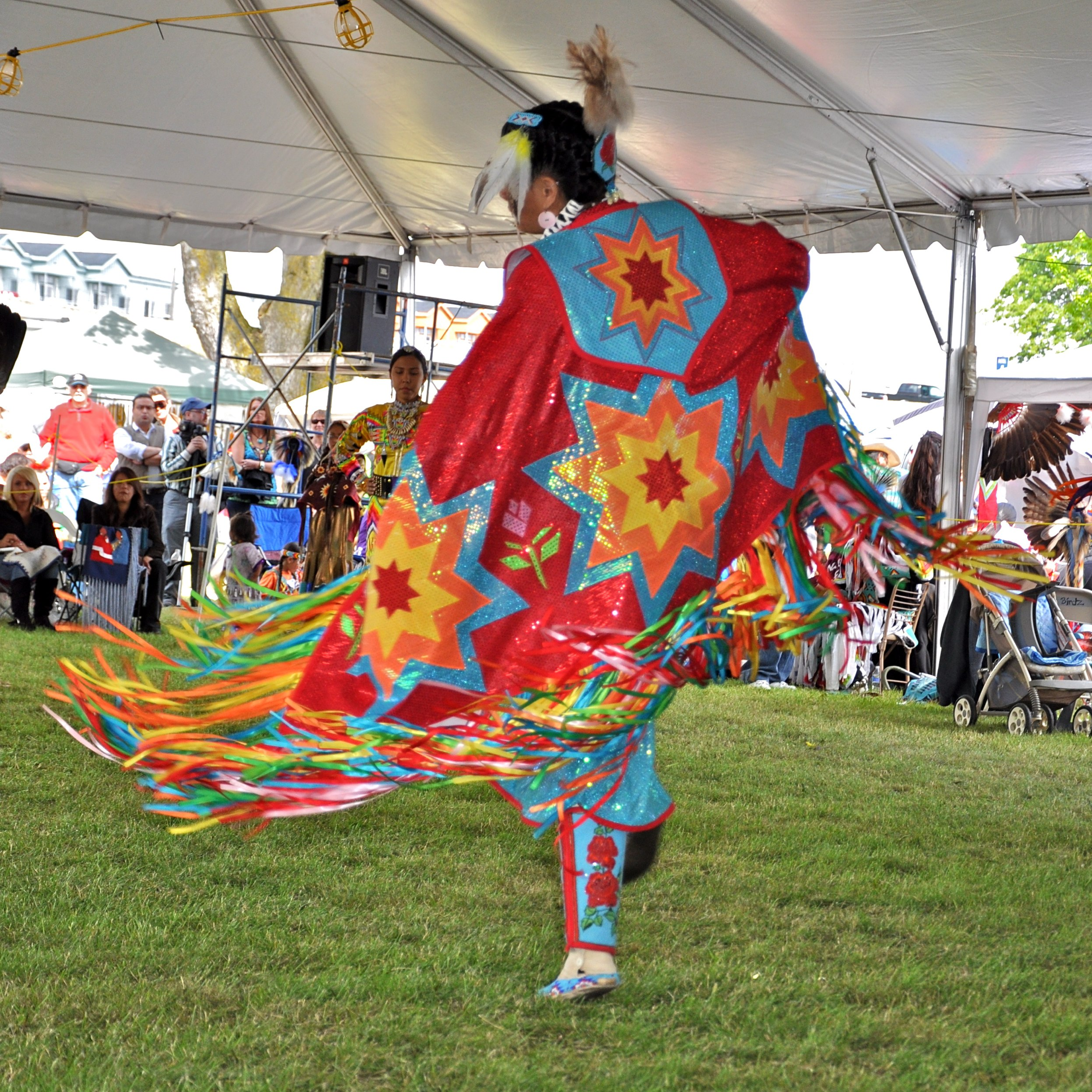
Many believe economic revival must originate on the reservation, and incorporate the cultures of the peoples who reside on them.

=== Business challenges on reservations ===
There are many challenges facing business leaders on reservations. As discussed above, the substandard educational system leaves many aspiring entrepreneurs without necessary skills to fulfill their visions. The concentration of poverty and geographic isolation of many reservations severely limits the human capital from which business owners may draw to develop their business plans. The lack of disposable income of residents, furthermore, leaves reservation businesses with a limited customer base, while the shortcomings of telecommunications technologies can prevent expansion beyond reservation borders. In addition to material challenges facing economic development, some have criticized the ideological view of business ownership and development as solutions to reservation poverty. These critics have stated that conventional capitalist business plans run counter to many Native traditions, which stress community and interdependence rather than individualism and competition.

It is often noted that the reservation system needs change. Some have asserted that the entire system needs to be eliminated, but disagree on what should take its place. Anthropologist Shuichi Nagata has stated that both the reservations and modern American cities clash with traditional Native lifestyles. What is needed, he writes, is something separate from either that combines the cultural richness of reservations with the opportunity of contemporary urban centers.

== See also ==
- Modern social statistics of Native Americans
- Native Americans and reservation inequality
- Alcohol and Native Americans
- Methamphetamine and Native Americans
- Native American disease and epidemics
- Impact of Native American gaming
- Prostitution on Native American Reservations in North America

Administration:

- Native American reservation politics
- Native American gambling enterprises
- Former Indian Reservations in Oklahoma
- Indian country jurisdiction

General:

- Native American self-determination
- Tribal disenrollment
- Tribal sovereignty
- New World syndrome
