= Native Americans and reservation inequality =

Social issue in the U.S.

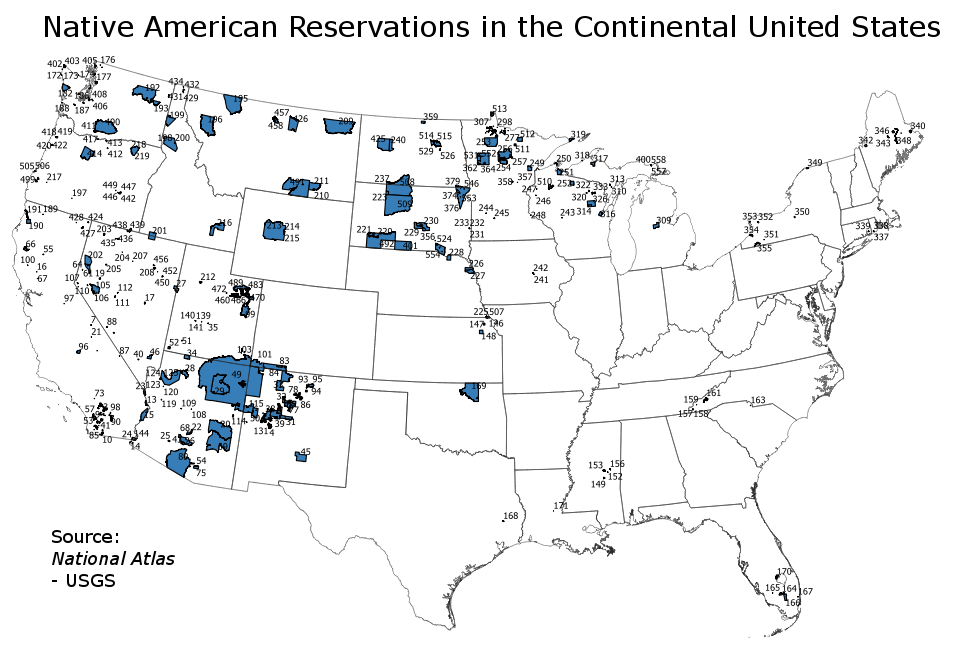
Bureau of Indian Affairs map of reservations in the continental United States

Native American reservation inequality underlies a range of societal issues that affect the lives of Native American populations residing on reservations in the United States. About one third of the Native American population, about 700,000 people, lives on an Indian Reservation in the United States. Reservation poverty and other discriminatory factors have led to persisting social inequality on Native American reservations. Disparities between many aspects of life at the national level and the reservation level, such as quality of education, quality of healthcare, substance use disorders, teenage pregnancy, violence, and suicide rates are significant in demonstrating the inequality of opportunities and situations between reservations and the rest of the country.

== Historical discrimination ==
Many contemporary disparities are rooted in the violence of colonialism. The reservation system was created following the expansion of the United States into tribal lands throughout the 19th and 20th centuries, during United States territorial acquisitions. This effort started with the Indian Appropriations Act of 1887, which created the first reservations. As they decided to take over rather of improving the territory they were contradicting the whole purpose of it showing the greed towards the land rather showing respect to the indigenous people. This creates a constant idea "...refers to the moment a white man encountered, documented, and interpreted a place that becomes the point of reference for a 'pristine or pure' moment to restore land to..." Which defeated the whole meaning behind the land as if they founded it, losing its true meaning and the creators taking all the credit. This continues to highlight how their way of changing was nothing but harmful, "...approaches do not give room for adaptation, nor do they take into consideration diverse relationships with land and place by a variety of Indigenous peoples and their place-based practices over generations." Defeating the whole purpose to improve the land that was stolen. We see how indigenous people continue to struggle in the modernization that is put upon them "Indigeneity also expresses a planetary connection and solidarity with Indigenous peoples around the earth who share cultural values and struggles..." There is this constant struggle that put upon the indigenous people. They created a creation that was so easily taken from, they don't get enough credit for it. "These movements are alter-natives to the oversimplified, romanticised, and tokenising treatment of Indigenous peoples when they are mentioned in mainstream environmentalism." Their highlights and achievement are very under talked about which creates an image that the indigenous weren't as important.

== Education ==
The Indian Self-Determination and Education Assistance Act (ISDEAA) resulted from culminating civil rights movements and calls for more attention on Native American Affairs. According to the Bureau of Indian Affairs (BIA), the act "gave authority to federally recognized tribes to contract with the BIA for the operation of Bureau-funded schools and to determine education programs suitable for their children." Later federal educational amendments furthered the capabilities of reservation schools and "provided funds directly to tribally operated schools, empowered Indian school boards, permitted local hiring of teachers and staff," and more.

=== Contemporary reservation school situations ===
Schools on Native American reservations are disproportionately underachieving compared to other schools. According to a report made to the U.S. Department of Education "only 17% of tribally controlled schools made Annual [sic] Yearly Progress under No Child Left Behind during the 2007-2008 school year." Much of the reasoning for this discrepancy is because of the widespread and disproportionate amount of reservation poverty. Consequently, "students from low socioeconomic families face unique academic challenges, as their families may lack access to the resources and socialization experiences necessary to adequately prepare and support student achievement in school." Furthermore, "the lack of academically successful role models and the need to provide additional financial support to the family contributed to the high number of dropouts among Native American students who live in poverty."

Both student and teacher attrition are major issues in reservation schools as well. Censuses have demonstrated the trend in reservation schools that, "despite a growth in population... enrollment in grades 1 through 12 has steadily declined..." The High School dropout rate for Native Americans is high, much higher than the national average, and as quoted in a UCLA Civil Rights project report, "Native students "...have a dropout rate twice the national average; the highest dropout rate of any United States ethnic or racial group. About three out of every ten Native students drop out of school before graduating from high school both on reservations and in cities (p. 1).""

Teachers are also remarkably and especially difficult to retain at reservation schools, which creates problems with regularity in the classroom and many administrative difficulties as well. There are many reasons for poor teacher retention, mainly problems in "poverty, hunger, ignorance, and disease", as Reyhner's Teaching American Indian Students book argues, that discourage teachers when students are unable or unwilling to perform or even come to school. One of the implications of high teacher turnover is the lack of administrative stability it causes. Administrative stability is very important to long-range planning and crucial to the success of the school and its students.

== Healthcare ==
Healthcare on Native American reservations faces many barriers to success. Genetic predisposition to many diseases as well as significant lack of government funding, lack of medical resources, and isolation from more populated areas with more medical resources, contribute to healthcare difficulties on reservations.

=== Genetic predisposition ===
Native Americans have a biological genetic predisposition to be especially susceptible to several diseases and ailments. According to a 1997 study, "with the exception of cardiovascular diseases and cancer, the risk of death from most causes are higher among Native Americans than the total US population."

Diabetes mellitus is an especially large factor in Native American healthcare. Studies show that "rates of diabetes and its complications…are substantially higher among Native Americans than among the US general population, and the frequency of diabetes among Native Americans is increasing." This increase is proposed to be based upon, as the same study states, "several potentially modifiable factors, including obesity, dietary composition, and physical inactivity." It is estimated that diabetes afflicts 40%-50% of adults in Native American communities, compared with the national average of around 8%. Multiple studies, including one presented in the American Journal of Epidemiology, describe the incidence of diabetes in the Pima Indians to be 19 times greater than a comparable white majority population.

However, more than genetic predisposition plays a significant role the afflictions of Native American populations. According to the 1997 study, "genetic susceptibility plays a significant role in some diseases, such as diabetes, while for others, the generally lower socioeconomic status, higher prevalence of certain health risk behaviors and lower utilization of preventative services in the Native American population are important determinants." Also, before WWII, diabetes in Native American Communities was essentially non-existent.

Because the traditional way of life had been taken away from the Native Americans, a domino effect of problems began to arise. During a normal day of hunting, gathering, and normal activities, the pre-reservation Indians expended approximately 4,000 calories a day, while eating a high fiber, low fat diet. After the reservation system went into effect, Indians were no longer able to hunt or gather food, but expected to farm in a community that at certain places had no water source, or there was no money to buy supplies for a farm in the first place, which led to more poverty. Poverty led to poor eating habits, which led to diseases such as diabetes mellitis.

After the Indian Removal Act of 1830, subsequent treaties arose, such as the Dawes Act of 1887, which broke up reservations into smaller pieces. In 1868, the Federal Government established the Indian Peace Commission which took thousands of acres of land promised to Indians in previous treaties. With the diminishing of their land, Indians had to deal with diminishing health as well.

=== Indian Health Service ===
The Indian Health Service is a federal program whose purpose is to provide medical service and support to Native Americans. The service covers all members of federally recognized tribes, over 4 million people. While it receives significant federal funds in the billions of dollars, this is still several times less than what it should be, as estimated by tribal leaders.

=== Lack of support ===
The lack of preventative medicine knowledge and resources, specifically, contributes to and exacerbates the medical predispositions of many Native Americans. The lack of research done on, and the lack of attention paid to Native Americans and reservation healthcare is part of the problem. A study done by the Agency for Healthcare Research and Quality found that "only 42% of measures of health care quality and access tracked in the National Healthcare Disparities Report could be used to assess disparities among American Indians and Alaska Natives." The same source also argued that "data from American Indians and Alaska Natives need to be improved to allow better targeting of interventions to reduce health care disparities and monitoring the success of these activities." A lack of healthcare providers in reservations also detrimentally effects quality and continuity of care.

=== Lack of healthcare providers ===
A lack of healthcare providers in reservations also detrimentally effects quality and continuity of care. Tribal communities are often sequestered in unfavorable and isolated locations. According to a study of provider vacancies in the Indian Health Service (IHS), conducted by the Department of Health and Human Services (2016), about half of the clinics studied identified their remote location as a large obstacle for hiring and retaining staff. Issues surrounding isolation, lack of shopping centers, schools, and entertainment also dissuades providers from moving to these areas. Such vacancies lead to cutting of patient services, delays in treatment, and negative effects on employee morale. Studies show that these problems may be addressed by growing a Native American healthcare workforce.

==== Native American healthcare workforce ====
A 2009 study finds that there is a strong prevalence of cross-cultural miscommunication, mistrust, and lack of satisfaction among Native American patients when it comes to healthcare. A connection between mistrust from a community and health disparities is established in a 2014 study on "Cultural Identity and Patient Trust Among Older American Indians". Native Americans have reported facing discrimination which has affected the quality of care they received. The Association of American Medical Colleges (AAMC) supports that doctor-patient relationships and communication can be improved if members of their tribal communities themselves become healthcare providers.

Native American doctors Siobhan Wescott and Beth Mittelstet argue that greater funding should be directed towards educating and encouraging indigenous people to become physicians in order to help remedy issues with staffing, reduce discrimination in care, lower Native American poverty rates, and increase patient advocacy among physicians. In 2018, the AAMC reported that there American Indian and Alaskan natives constitute only 0.3% of the physician workforce. In 2018, they made up about 2% of the total US population. Assistant professors at the University of Minnesota School of Medicine have proposed creating new formal graduate medical education programs based in tribal communities which focus on delivery systems, social determinants of health, and community influenced solutions. The Indian Health Service offers loan repayment programs to encourage post-graduate doctors to take fellowships on reservations. Several institutions such as UCSF, The University of Washington, and Massachusetts General Hospital have fellowships dedicated to filling full-time coverage positions. Scholarships are also available to indigenous students pursuing medicine as well as those non-indigenous students who seek to work in tribal communities.

A summit in 2018 called "Populating the Native Health Care Workforce with American Indian and Alaska Native Physicians: Moving the Needle on Quality of Health Care in Indian Country" gathered tribal leaders, IHS administrators, and medical school leaders to find barriers and come up with solutions to low Native American provider rates. The solutions include garnering interest in medicine with students before college, creating a single online resource platform for AI/NA students, expanding financial aid opportunities, and enhance programs that aid students in academics.

=== Tribal sovereignty and healthcare ===
The Indian Self-Determination and Education Assistance Act of 1975 allows tribes to enter into a contract with the government to assume control over healthcare facilities, thus side-stepping the Indian Health Service and allowing tribes more autonomy over how they approach and deliver health care. It also gives tribes direct access to federal grants not available to the IHS. The Cherokee Indian Hospital in North Carolina is self-governed, with 50% of funds coming from the IHS. Other funds come from sources like Medicaid and casino revenue, which would not be available under IHS control. Construction of the hospital was deliberate in incorporating cultural history and creating a reduced stress environment. Not all communities, however, have other significant sources of revenue such as the casino.

One drawback to Tribal leadership in the context of provider retention is presented from a research survey of Navajo Area IHS physicians. A major reason cited for a provider leaving was due to the transfer of IHS control to the Navajo Nation. The uncertainty in benefits and pay from this transition contributed to their decision to leave.

Several policy options have been proposed to help expand funding for Native American health initiatives that revolve around recognizing tribal sovereignty. One includes having the Navajo Nation create its own Medicaid agency, effectively designating it as a state. This would come with its own logistical issues of transferring those in the Navajo nation already under Medicaid through the state. However, without having to navigate the varying laws of the multiple states the Navajo Nation exists in, tribal sovereignty could be upheld and administration would be smoother. Another policy opportunity would be to prevent cuts to Medicaid programs under the IHS. This would allow for better continuity of care in addressing the many health disparities they face. Another proposition is to utilize section 1115 of the Social Security Act which allows states to waive Medicaid requirements in favor of their own programs. Arizona already implemented this in 2012 by directing funds to the IHS and tribal facilities to cover care health costs for Native Americans.

== Obesity ==
American Indians of all ages and sexes have a generally high prevalence of obesity. Researchers have identified that issue has only come to light in the past few generations and much of it is linked to many individuals having a lack of healthy food options and an increased amount of time spent being sedentary. The overall health of Native Americans is considerably worse than the general population. Since the early 1950s, the rate of mortality from infectious disease has decreased substantially. But mortality related to behavioral or lifestyle factors has increased, and chronic diseases such as diabetes mellitus, heart disease, and cancer are among the leading causes of death in adults. Chronic diseases such as diabetes mellitus in particular, are strong indicators of an increasing prevalence of obesity in American Indians. Because the prevalence rates of obesity are higher in American Indians, studies have shown that the population will suffer from greater health complications later on in life as well.

=== History ===
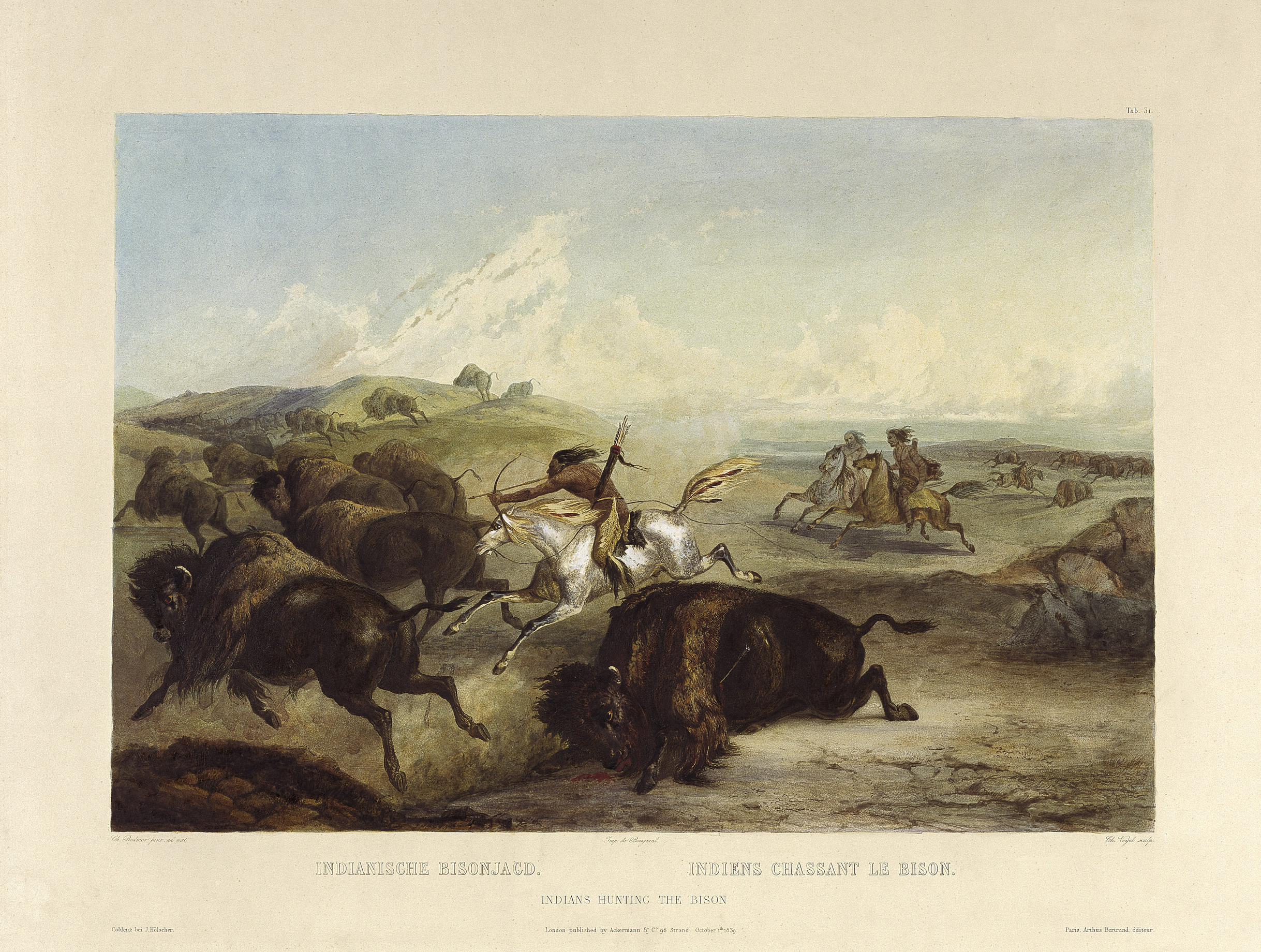
Native Americans hunting bison, a staple of the diet

The problem of poor nutrition in Native American communities has a historical narrative. The traditional Native American diet consisted wholly of lean meats, protein, fruits and vegetables and low in fat, non-processed sugars and sodium. Native people also hunted and fished quite extensively. This lifestyle persevered until the 1830s through the 1840s, when under the Indian Removal Act, Native American tribes signed treaties with the U.S. government that relocated the entire population to live on secluded land which became known as a reservation. This relocation also removed the Native people from their usual sources of food and the active lifestyle that hunting and gathering required. The removal created a significant dissonance in the ability to nourish properly. In addition, in 1890, the government placed a ban on Native Americans which prevented them from leaving their lands to fish, hunt or gather in their usual territories. In exchange, they were given government rations of flour, lard and sugar. These options were much cheaper but contained proportionally lower nutritional value. These foods became the new staple for American Indians as they developed a taste for the only foods available to them by law. Overtime, these foods were introduced to subsequent generations and the food became socialized into the household.

=== Access to food ===
Near many Indian reservations, the access to healthy food can be a big challenge. Areas surrounding many reservations are large food deserts, which are defined as communities without ready access to healthy and affordable food. Food deserts shift the consumer focus of eating healthier food to just merely securing enough food to feed individuals. The geographical isolation of many reservations create logistical and cost challenges, limiting people's ability to access affordable nutritious food because they live far from large grocery stores. Many reservations also do not have adequate transportation in and out, so that increases the difficulty of being able to go to grocery stores in the area. In some studies, researchers have found that rural residence was positively associated with food insecurity for American Indian households without children. In addition, American Indians had significantly higher levels of food insecurity than the rest of the population, even after controlling for a wide range of demographic and socioeconomic characteristics. In order to combat the issue of food insecurity in Native American communities, a sub-set of the food stamp program, known as the Food Distribution Program on Indian Reservations, or FDPIR, was started. The program provides culturally appropriate food to Native American communities. The logistical reality of the program is that it is a delivery system. The USDA purchases and ships FDPIR foods to the corresponding state agencies based on their orders from a list of available foods. These administering agencies store and distribute the food, determine applicant eligibility, and provide nutrition education to recipients. USDA provides the administering agencies with funds for program administrative costs. Individuals are eligible for the program if they 'qualify as American Indian or non-Indian households that reside on a reservation. You could also qualify if you belong to a household in approved areas near a reservation or in Oklahoma that contain at least one person who is a member of a federally-recognized tribe.

=== Diabetes ===
Diabetes is a prevalent issue in the American Indian and Native American communities. Some of the issues that arise from diabetes are accelerated development of cardiovascular diseases, renal disease, and loss of visual acuity, all of which contribute to excess morbidity and mortality rates. Akin to obesity, the increasing prevalence has been attributed to lifestyle changes in diet and physical activity. Among youth with Type II diabetes, an estimated 50 to 90 percent have a BMI ≥ 85th percentile for age. The prevalence of obesity among AI youth with Type II diabetes was 79.4 percent. Obesity prevalence was only 12.5 percent among youth with Type I diabetes. Other risk factors for Type II diabetes include family history and hypertension. The serious complications of diabetes are increasing in frequency among Native Americans. Of major concern are increasing rates of kidney failure, amputations, and blindness. Among people with diabetes, the rate of diabetic end-stage renal disease is six times higher among Native Americans. Diabetes is the most frequent cause of non-traumatic lower limb amputations. Amputation rates among Native Americans are 3-4 times higher than the general population. Diabetic retinopathy is a term used for all abnormalities of the small blood vessels of the retina caused by diabetes, such as weakening of blood vessel walls or leakage from blood vessels. Diabetic retinopathy occurs in 18 percent of Pima Indians and 24.4 percent of Oklahoma Indians. Obesity is a particularly important challenge to the health status of Native Americans because of a lack of resources and health interventions. Most studies of Native American infants, preschool children, schoolchildren, and adults have confirmed a high prevalence of being overweight. Researchers have hypothesized that there is a genetic component to being overweight as well as a large amount of environmental factors that contribute.

=== Intervention programs ===
Community-based interventions to modify diet and activity levels to prevent obesity in Native American communities are important steps in addressing obesity in Native American communities at an early age, but many of these programs are either grossly underfunded or do not exist in a capacity in which they are needed. Pilot school-based programs in the Southwestern United States suggest that Native American communities are actively receptive towards interventions within a school setting and that over time there is the potential of having a lower number of children meeting the BMI threshold of being obese. The cultural diversity of the Native American community along with the geographic diversity of many reservations, makes one specific kind of policy difficult. In ideal circumstances, Native Americans with diabetes will have their disease under good control and be monitored frequently by a healthcare team knowledgeable in the care of diabetes. Because people with diabetes have a multi-system, chronic disease, they are best monitored and managed by highly skilled healthcare professionals trained with the latest information on diabetes to help ensure early detection and appropriate treatment of the serious complications of the disease. A team approach to treating and monitoring this disease serves the best interests of the patient. Patient education is critical. People with diabetes can reduce their risk for complications if they are educated about their disease, learn, and practice the skills necessary to better control their blood glucose levels, and receive regular checkups from their healthcare team. People with diabetes, with the help of their healthcare providers, should set goals for better control of blood glucose levels, as close to the normal range as possible for them.

=== Junk-food tax ===
The largest Indian reservation in the United States, the Navajo nation, approved a sales tax on junk-food sold within the reservation. The piece of legislation approved increased by 2% the sales tax on food with little to no nutritional value. The tax was placed until the year 2020, by the-Navajo nation council. Navajos in favor wanted to pass a bill that could serve as a model for Indian country to improve the rates of diabetes and obesity among tribal members. Proposals targeting sugary drinks with proposed bans, size limits, tax hikes and warning labels have not gained widespread traction across the country. The effort is really much more in the message of Navajo people making better choices for quality foods. The obesity rate for some age groups is as high as 60%. Diabetes was the fourth-leading cause of death in the Navajo area from 2003 to 2005, the health service said. With a junk-food tax, lawmakers looked to increase support among other neighboring reservations. The pilot project will last until 2020, after which the analysis of obesity and the health of Native Americans living on the Navajo Nation will be assessed.

== Substance use ==
The use of drugs, alcohol, and cigarettes on reservations is higher on Native American reservations than the national averages. According to research on alcoholism in Native American populations, "the problem of alcohol abuse is now defined as one that is both foreign to and destructive of the traditional culture." Native American youth show higher rates of drinking and drug use than most other racial or ethnic groups and those that live on reservations are at the highest risk of developing alcohol related problems. According to Kunitz study on alcoholism in Native American populations, reasons for the prevalence of alcoholism and alcohol consumption on reservations is attributable to "access to alcohol became much easier, and patterns of drinking that had not been particularly problematic in the past began to have measurable consequences in respect of morbidity and mortality." Such consumption and addiction is especially prevalent on reservations. Another explanation for the prevalence of alcoholism on reservations is advertising and the responsibility of beer and alcohol manufacturers and distributors.

Marijuana and prescription drug use for Native American teens are twice the national average and young people have been shown to start experimenting with alcohol at the age of 14. The onset of alcohol usage before the age of 15 has been found to be associated with lower achievement, academic problems, drug use and alcoholism later in life.

Alcoholism in Native American populations has been shown to be associated with development of disease, including sprains and muscle strains, hearing and vision problems, kidney and bladder problems, head injuries, pneumonia, tuberculosis, dental problems, liver problems, and pancreatitis. Alcoholism death rates among young Native Americans is 3.4 deaths per 100,000, over ten times the national average of 0.3 deaths per 100,000 of the general population. Though alcohol usage varies by region and tribal affiliation, there remains a high risk factor for all Native American populations and particularly those on Native American reservations.

== Teenage pregnancy ==
Teenage pregnancy among the Native American population represents the third highest birth rate in the United States with 59 per 1,000 births in 2007. Between 2005 and 2007 the birth rate among Native Indian teen girls increased 12%, more than twice the national increase in teenage pregnancy. Rates of teenage pregnancy however differ by geographic region and tribal affiliation. Teen pregnancy of 15- to 19-year-old women in the Navajo Tribe have among the highest rates of teenage pregnancy, 15.8% higher than the national average.

=== Contraceptive use among Native American teenagers ===
Native American populations show some of the lowest documented rates of contraceptive use in the United States. A recent health study shows that 65% of males and 57% of females report having sexual intercourse by the 12th grade. Only 40% and 50% respectively report always using contraceptives and more than one third of males and one half of females had sex without contraceptives between the 7th and 9th grade. 7% of females in a study of Native American schools report incidences of pregnancy but rates are skewed due to school drop out rates. Data from the ADD Health Survey conducted on students of Bureau of Indian Affairs schools show that high school students from schools on Native American land are more likely to have had sexual intercourse when compared to the national rates of high school students. In general Native youth are more likely to have sexual intercourse at a younger age compared to their peers and are less likely to have used contraception the last time they had sex compared to their peers.

The low rates of contraceptive use are sometimes attributed to a historical disinclination of public discussions of sexuality and perceptions of shame associated with sexual behavior. Additionally access to sexual health organizations and family planning centers on Native American reservations remains limited.

=== Consequences of teenage pregnancy in Native youth ===
The high concentration of poverty and extreme poverty on Native American reservations has potentially severe consequences for pregnant teenagers. These negative consequences include educational deficits, economic strain, poor marital outcomes, as well as slowed cognitive, social, and physical development in children of adolescent parents. In 2006, 90% of teenage pregnancies among Native teenagers aged 15 to 19 were to unmarried mothers. Single parent, female headed households are at higher risk of impoverishment with almost 41% of all single parent female headed households in the United States residing below the national poverty line.

The recent rise in teenage pregnancy in Native Teen populations coupled with the already high rates of poverty on Native American Reservations has potentially detrimental consequences for Native families. A Study completed by the United States Department of Agriculture found Native American young mothers on reservations show a tendency to begin prenatal care later than their peers. They were also found to have higher rates of substance use disorder during pregnancy and are more likely to have diabetes during pregnancy. Native Americans on reservations in particular showed greater rates of participation in public assistance services and their children suffered higher rates of nutritional, dietary, and clinical risks than children not born on the reservation. Advocates suggest the implementation of policies and programs that will delay sexual initiation and improve contraceptive use among Native teenagers as a possible solution to the rising rates of teen pregnancy.

== Violence against Native women ==
Native American women have the highest rates of violent crime victimization, more than double that of other racial groups. In the violent acts committed against Native women, Native American women are more likely to have injuries that require medical attention than crimes committed against other races. They are also more likely to face an armed assailant than female victims of violent acts of other races. On a number of Native American reservations Native Women are murdered at a rate representing ten times the national average. Violent crime rates over all on Native American reservations are 2.5 times the national average while some individual reservations reach 20 times the national average of violent crime.

=== Historical factors ===
Some scholars suggest that historically, physical and sexual violence in Native American communities was rare in Pre-Colonial society, while others disagree. Traditional gender roles advocated co-dependence, where women's contributions were honored and respected and where violence against Native women was heavily punished by Native justice systems.

Colonial and Post-colonial changes in Native American society spurred transformations in these traditional perceptions of gender norms and Native American societal structure. The General Allotment Act of 1887 allocated private lands to male heads of household that belied many traditions of maternal land inheritance. Women also were denied access to farming responsibilities that took away venues for accruing leadership and honor within the community.

The conversion of traditional names to Christian names in the evangelical movement to Christianize Native populations also decreased female gender status. The historical tracing of lineage through maternal lines were changed to follow kinship ties through the father's last name. These changes in gender norms are suggested to contribute to the high rates of violent crimes against Native American women.

=== Sexual assault and Native women ===
According to the National Violence Against Women Survey, 34% of American Indian and Alaskan Native women have suffered from rape or attempted rape within their lifetimes. This is greater than the 18% of white women, 19% of African American women and 7% of Asian and Pacific Islander women that completed the survey. In South Dakota, only 10% of the population is Native American but Native women make up 40% of all sexual assault cases in the state. Similarly, Alaska Natives make up only 15% of the population but represent 61% of victims of reported sexual assault cases.

While nationwide most sexual offenses are intra-racial or between members of the same race, the sexual offenses against Native American women and Alaskan Native women are more often committed by white offenders. Between 1992 and 2005, 57% of reported rapes and sexual assaults against Native American women were committed by white offenders, 10% by African American offenders, and 33% by Native American and Asian American offenders. Between 1992 and 2002, 86% of Native American victims of sexual assault described the perpetrator as non-Indian.

=== Obstructions to legal action ===
Although violent crime and sexual assault rates are high in Native American reservations, prosecution for these crimes is relatively low. In 2007, on the Navajo Nation, of the 329 rape cases reported among a population of 180,000 individuals, only 17 arrests were made in five years. In 2011, of all rape cases reported on Native American reservations the Justice Department only prosecuted 65%. Correspondingly, Native American reservations have a high proportion of sex offenders within the population.

The low prosecution rates and rates of arrest result from numerous factors. Native American women have extremely low rates of reporting sexual assault. Some women's advocacy groups in Native American communities suggest that only 10% of all sexual offenses are reported. Many Native women report feelings of betraying the community by coming forward, especially if the non-Native court systems are involved. Native Women also report a lack of faith in the local law enforcement to make arrests and prosecute offenders.

Even when sexual assaults are reported to the authorities, prosecution is not certain. According to a study by Amnesty International in 2006, the local police often either do not respond to a sexual assault case or take hours or days to respond to the victims reports. Additionally due to the overlapping jurisdiction of tribal, state, and federal authorities, enforcement of protection orders for victims remains largely unreliable. Tension between these three groups hinders responsiveness and efficiency in the prosecution of sexual offenders and the protection of the victims.

Tribal authorities also have limited jurisdiction over the prosecution of non-native offenders. 46% of the Native American reservation population are non-natives. As of 1978, under the Supreme Court case Oliphant v. Suquamish Indian Tribe, tribal courts are denied inherent jurisdiction to criminally prosecute non-natives. Tribal governments therefore have limited powers of legal processes over a significant portion of the resident population. This has negative impacts due to the high rates of intra-racial sexual assaults against Native American women.

=== Re-authorization of the Violence Against Women Act ===
The re-authorization of the Violence Against Women Act (VAWA) spurred controversy among the Native American community in 2012. The act, having expired, lent itself to revisions in the United States House of Representatives and the United States Senate. The Senate's re-authorization worked to eliminate some of the limitations on criminal jurisdiction of the tribal courts. In the summer of 2012, the Republican majority in the House of Representatives proffered a separate re-authorization of VAWA. The House re-authorization stripped tribal protections from the jurisdiction of tribal courts. The House's Bill would disallow Indian tribal courts from accusing non-natives on the grounds of domestic violence within reservations.

President Obama's White House administration vowed to veto any re-authorization of VAWA that failed to include the tribal protection clause. On February 28, 2013, President Barack Obama received the Senate's re-authorization of VAWA after a vote passing the act in both the House of Representatives and the Senate.

In 2022 VAWA expanded its recognition of Special Tribal Criminal Jurisdiction to cover non-Native criminals of sexual violence, abuse of children, sex trafficking, and other assaults on Tribal law enforcement officers and community members on Tribal lands.

== Suicide rates ==
Native American and Alaskan Native populations have disproportionately high rates of homicide and suicide, particularly among younger populations. Between 1979 -1992, 2,394 individuals who lived in or near a reservation committed suicide. This represents 1.5 times the national average during these 14 years. Since 1950 the suicide rate among 15- to 24-year-old Native American youths has increased between 200% and 300%. This rate is higher than other racial groups, making Indian youth suicide rates 2 to 3 times the rates nationwide. Suicide rates are greatest especially among Native American males following the general trends of gender and suicide.

Suicide rates vary depending on region and tribal affiliation but rates are particularly high in the Southwestern United States, the northern Rocky Mountains and Great Plains, and in Alaska. High suicide rates are often correlated with substance use disorder, alcoholism, depression, and poverty, widespread in many Native American reservations. Studies have shown that early substance use can lead to higher homicide and suicide rates among a population group.

Risk factors for suicide often include a sense of hopelessness, alcohol use disorder, depression, poverty and a triggering conflict or event which can include conflict or loss. Among 77% of males who died by suicide or attempted suicide had incomes of less than 10,000 dollars and 79% were unemployed. Native American youth also report higher rates of exposure to violence and sexual and physical abuse, both correlated to suicide rates. Other possible contributing factors include the mother's age at delivery, family conflict, and financial instability. Additionally 20% of all individuals who died by suicide or attempted suicide had a parent who had also died by suicide or attempted suicide.

Community-based programming has been shown to effectively alleviate some of the risk factors on Native American reservations associated with suicide. These programs have been proven to decrease substance use and increase communal connections and support.

== See also ==
- American Indian alcoholism
- Cultural assimilation of Native Americans
- Impact of Native American gaming
- Methamphetamine and Native Americans
- Modern social statistics of Native Americans
- Native American boarding schools
- Native American disease and epidemics
- Native American identity in the United States
- Native American reservation politics
- Native American self-determination
- Reservation poverty
- Tribal disenrollment
- Tribal sovereignty
