= Impact of Native American gaming =

The impact of Native American gaming depends on the tribe and its location. In the 1970s, various tribes took unprecedented action to initiate gaming enterprises. In this revitalization of the Native American economy, they created a series of legal struggles between the federal, state, and tribal governments. Gaming has stimulated tribal economies by providing jobs and generating revenue but has also been controversial through its threat to tribal sovereignty, disputes over the negative impact of gaming, and a loss of Native American culture. The Indian Gaming Regulatory Act was passed in 1988 to secure collaboration between the states and tribes and also for the federal government to oversee gaming operations.

== Success ==
Gaming can be extremely successful because it stimulates the economy, increases tourism to reservations, reduces unemployment, raises incomes, and increases tribal independence while reducing dependence upon the United States welfare state. It has created more than 300,000 jobs in the United States. Tribes in only 30 states are eligible to operate gaming enterprises because 16 states have no federally recognized tribes, and five states (Massachusetts, Texas, Missouri, Rhode Island, and Utah) prohibit Native American gaming. 224 of the 550 tribes in 28 states operate the 350 Native American gaming enterprises nationwide, and 68% of Native Americans belong to a tribe with gaming operations.

These enterprises earned $4.5 billion in 1995, and the Harvard Project on American Indian Economic Development reported $19.4 billion in 2005. This accounts for 25.8% of the US's $75 billion gaming revenue. Tribal gaming provides 400,000 jobs, and the profits often go toward programs that create jobs. For example, 75% of the profit generated by Cherokee Nation Enterprises in 2005 was given to the Jobs Growth Fund, which expands businesses within the Cherokee Nation to create more jobs.

Revenues, by law, must go toward improving reservation communities. The Indian Gaming Regulatory Act requires that revenues go toward tribal government operations, promotion of the welfare of the tribe and its citizens, economic development, support of charitable organizations, and compensation to local non-Native governments for support of services provided by those governments. Tribes have boosted their socioeconomic status in the past several years by improving their infrastructure, but due to the lack of federal and state funding, have only been able to do so as a result of gaming enterprises. For instance, tribes often build casino-related facilities that draw visitors such as hotels, conference centers, entertainment venues, golf courses, and RV parks.

Once a reservation has established a strong economic foundation, it can draw in businesses that are unrelated to gaming. A common trend is that casinos stimulate the economy, and other business sustain it. For instance, the San Manuel Band of Mission Indians built in a water-bottling plant on the reservation, and along with three other tribes, invested in a hotel in Washington, DC. The Winnebago Tribe of Nebraska is involved in a number of businesses including Internet media, home manufacturing, used cars, and gas stations. The Morongo Band of Mission Indians, a small band in California, has opened a Shell station, A&W drive-in, Coco's Restaurant, a water-bottling plant, and a fruit orchard operation. In addition to involvement in private corporations, Native nations have enough sustainability to bolster government programs. Some of these projects include law enforcement, fire fighters, schools, translators for emergency response, college scholarships, assistance with mortgage down payments, protection for endangered species, monitoring for water quality, care for elders, police cars, foster-care improvements, and health clinics.

Some tribes distribute funds on a per capita basis to directly benefit citizens. Because these have sometimes shown negative impact such as a dependence on tribal government, low attendance in school, and an unwillingness to work, some tribes have experimented with decreasing per capita payments as punishment. For example, the Fort McDowell Yavapai Nation Tribal Council deducted at least $100 from families' payments if children have low school attendance, yielding a 30% increase in graduation in three years. The Las Vegas Paiute Nation deducted funding for jail provision from the offenders' payments because the Nation does not have a jail and must rent it from other governments. Punishments such as these provide an incentive for morality through a direct link to financial assistance from the payments.

States also benefit from Native American gaming enterprises. States cannot tax reservations, but they can, under IGRA, negotiate a compact and demand compact payments. Tribes usually pay near or less than 10% of profit to states. The state of Michigan earned an estimated $325 million from tribes spanning from 1993-2003.

Laws require a tribe to agree to a state compact upon request, but the IGRA says nothing about local governments. However, many tribes do negotiate with local governments. They place a strain on traffic and emergency services, and a tribe not uncommonly tries to compensate for that. Native Americans pay $50 million annually to local governments across the nation. In addition, non-Natives hold 75% of the 300,000 jobs that belong to Native American gaming.

With gaming profits, the Creek Nation of Oklahoma has built its own hospital staffed by Native American doctors and nurses. Other tribes establish health clinics, dialysis centers, and fitness centers to deal with the problem of Native American disease and epidemics. Many tribes work toward securing hope for the future by improving schools. The Mille Lacs Band of Ojibwe built two schools that teach fluency in English as well as Ojibwe language.

== Failure ==
Other than gaming, most of the many past attempts to revitalize Native American economies have failed. Two of the more successful ventures include selling gasoline and cigarettes for a much lower price because there is no state tax. Less effective Seminole Nation efforts include cattle raising, craft selling, and alligator wrestling. Cattle operations led to government dependency and debt, and benefit mostly the individual.

If a Native American casino is unsuccessful, its failure is often linked to its geographic location. The size of a tribe is usually insignificant. This argument follows the logic of a free market economy. Tribes with a strong economic base find it easier to draw in new businesses and consumers. Tribes in remote locations suffer because they lack a consumer base to support new and existing businesses. For example, the Morongo Band of Mission Indians is very small, but its gaming enterprises are overwhelmingly successful. In contrast, the Sioux Nation, a very large nation with thousands of members and approximately 12 gambling halls, is unable to benefit from gaming enterprises because it is too isolated from potential customers. Another example is that four tribes in San Diego County had ambitious plans for a $100 million-plus resort and convention center but preemptively scaled back this idea because of the inconvenient location. Far away from other civilization and in close proximity to each other, the tribes concluded their chances of an overwhelming success were slim.

The Pine Ridge Indian Reservation, the fourth largest reservation in the United States, suffers from extreme poverty. It is the poorest county in the United States and has attempted to revitalize its economy through the gambling industry. However, these attempts have failed. Its casino created a mere 80 jobs, but this figure is insignificant because the unemployment rate on the reservation is up to 95%. The reservation has higher unemployment, diabetes, infant mortality, teen suicide, dropout, and alcoholism rates than the entire US. Many homes are dilapidated, overcrowded, and without water, plumbing, and electricity. Pine Ridge's failed attempts are predictable considering the closest major city, Denver, Colorado, is 350 miles away.

== Impact on native cultures ==
With Native American gaming has come the image of a "rich Indian". This depiction contrasts other images of Native Americans portrayed as savage, pure, connected to nature, and spiritual. The reality that some Native Americans are powerful entrepreneurs contradicts the notion of what a Native American is "supposed to be". "Rich Indian" propaganda even circulated in response to Proposition 5 in California in 1998 that perpetuated the stereotype that "the only good Indian is a poor Indian".

Eve Darian-Smith and others have asserted that the effect of gaming on Indian culture in general is a loss of a cultural myth. According to Ronald Wright, these ideas are based on stereotypes and are "construed by the dominant society in an effort to control and justify the enduring inequalities and injustices that permeate our legal system and social landscape". One perspective is that Native American gaming is not so much damaging Native culture as it is merely changing a cultural myth, the way the general population perceives Native Americans. Additionally, Native American gaming can be viewed as a means to rejuvenate and preserve tribal culture. For instance, many tribes use revenues generated from gaming toward museums and cultural centers. Tribes are able to fund themselves independently and can also afford to preserve their individual histories.

== Controversy ==
There is some controversy of Native American gaming because it is argued that it contributes to a moral decay. Gambling, it is argued, promotes crime and pathological behavior. Gambling addictions as well as substance use are sometimes associated with gaming. In 1962, the total estimated sums in the United States totaled $2 billion. This figure jumped to $18 billion in 1976, to $80 billion in 1985, and to $400 billion in 1993. In 2000, the total estimated sums wagered in the United States was $866 billion. In 2000, the commercial take was 10%, so the gaming industry earned approximately $70 billion, even accounting for the fact that gamblers win some money back. That is more than three times the $22 billion in total revenues generated by all other forms of entertainment combined: tickets to movies, plays, concerts, performances, and sports events. Moreover, Native American gaming contributes to only a fraction of gambling in the United States. Native American casinos bring in only 17% of gambling revenue, while non-Native casinos raise 43%.

In late 2002, TIME magazine printed a special report entitled "Indian Casinos: Wheel of Misfortune" that infuriated Native Americans nationwide. Ernie Stevens, Jr., Chairman of the National Indian Gaming Association, wrote a letter to the editor of TIME in response to the report.

== In popular culture ==
The first literary appearance of Native American gaming was in John Rollin Ridge's 1854 novel The Life and Adventures of Joaquin Murieta. Christal Quintasket wrote about Native American gaming in her 1927 novel Cogewea, the Half-Blood. Gerald Vizenor writes on this theme in Bearheart: The Heirship Chronicles, The Heirs of Columbus, and Dead Voices. Leslie Marmon Silko wrote a 1977 novel called Ceremony that focuses on gambling. Louise Erdrich, a prominent Native American author, wrote Love Medicine, Tracks, and The Bingo Palace. Traditional, ritual gaming is a common theme in these pieces of literature and provide literary, rather than fact-based, accounts of Native American gaming.

== See also ==
- Jack Abramoff Indian lobbying scandal
- Mohawk Civil War
- Native American identity in the United States
- Native American reservation politics
- Native American self-determination
- Tribal disenrollment
- Tribal sovereignty
