= Prostitution on Native American Reservations in North America =

Sex trafficking on Native American reservations in the United States began in the 18th century, as the American Revolution with its patterns of relocation, chaos, and conquest of Native American populations, inspired periods of instability for years to come. This instability would then cause cycles of generational trauma which created increased vulnerability to substance abuse, violence, poverty, and child neglect, therefore, increasing their susceptibility to sex trafficking.

During the United States's periods of rapid modernization in the 19th–20th centuries, this vulnerability to sexual violence and trafficking heightened as Native populations were being pushed into the sex trade by traffickers from neighboring cities who preyed on these vulnerabilities and would promise a better future to their victims. During the modern era, attempts to decrease the rate at which Indigenous women and girls were sold into the sex trade were stagnant due to the lack of reporting and unclear jurisdiction regarding prosecuting sex traffickers.

== Link between colonization and generational trauma ==
=== Historical wrongdoings ===
During the late 18th century the American Revolution inspired a period of conquest, colonization, ongoing warfare, enslavement, and relocation of Indigenous populations. Ravishing through Native land colonizers would often buy and sell Indigenous women and children for sex. Many soldiers demanded sexual favors from the Native women, sexually assaulted them, and sold them for sex. In the eyes of the colonizers, they were seen as "prostitutes that existed to be sexually used". When enslaved, these Indigenous women were sold into the sex trade and trapped into a cycle of non-consensual sexual activities.

=== Forced relocation ===
Following the period of rapid colonization, Indigenous populations were forced to relocate to isolated locations. This forced relocation disrupted the daily lives of the Native populations and caused widespread instability among them including increased poverty and homelessness. As a result, many Indigenous parents were unable to properly house, feed, clothe, and support their children, causing a further cycle of instability across generations.

=== Generational trauma ===
Intergenerational trauma is defined as "a traumatic event that began years prior to the current generation and has impacted in ways in which individuals within a family understand, cope with, and heal from the trauma". Due to patterns of forced relocation, racism, and sexual violence towards Indigenous populations, remnants of those misfortunes have transcribed into further vulnerabilities.

Following colonization, the lives of Indigenous individuals were disrupted, causing instability that would be felt for generations to come. The systematic racism and disruption caused stress among Native families that lead to dysfunctional circumstances in their home lives. Some of these dysfunctions included increased drug and alcohol use, domestic violence, depression, PTSD, and neglect of children.

These patterns of dysfunction traveled across generations as cycles of abuse, neglect, and overall struggles became commonplace.

As a result of these dysfunctions, Native teens and women were at high risk for sexual violence and sex trafficking. With increasing levels of substance abuse, poverty, and trauma, Indigenous parents would often neglect their parental duties, pushing many teens into the sex industry and increasing their vulnerability of being trafficked due to financial struggle and overall lack of guidance.

This lack of guidance also caused teens to be unaware and caused teens to be easily manipulated by traffickers, who would often make promises of financial stability and a better life, knowing the dysfunctional home lives of the Indigenous teens.

== A new sexual market ==
Through the emergence of modernization, increased infrastructure, and urbanization of once-rural areas, in the late 19th through 21st centuries the vulnerability of Indigenous populations in situations of sexual violence and sex trafficking heightened. Oftentimes, large cities and companies would be placed near already established reservations, exposing Natives to the mainstream Western societies that they were once isolated from. Urban areas and cities placed near reservations were are often filled with a large surplus of unmarried men who were now in have proximity to Indigenous women and girls.

As a result, this created a huge market for sex as these men would often not have any other access to a large supply of women. These men would frequently gamble, drink, and attend bars and casinos, while the Native women, who often lived in impoverished circumstances, would offer sexual services to these men at the local bars, gas stations, and casinos to survive and purchase basic necessities.

This blend of two once separated worlds also involved the forced removal of Native American women and girls out of their homes on reservations, and into the sex trade. With such a large market of sex buyers that the neighboring cities provided, sex traffickers saw an opportunity to make a large income off of the surplus of vulnerable women and girls on these reservations. Men from the cities would enter the reservations, purchase young girls, and sell them into the sex trade. Due to the high levels of poverty on these reservations, the parents of these girls were forced to cooperate because they needed the money for survival.

Patterns of sex trafficking are common in Midwest states such as North and South Dakota that have large fracking camps and oil companies placed near reservations. These large labor forces of often unmarried men, bring in a large demand for sex work as well as a high rate of sexual violence against Native women and girls. Oftentimes, men from these camps would enter the neighboring reservations and sexually assault and rape the women on them. Traffickers also began to see the large market that these camps provided and an incentive to lure Native women off of reservations and into the sex market to be sold to these men for profit.

This pattern of sexual violence and sex trafficking of Native women and girls disrupted the entire dynamic of these reservations. Exposure to the outside, modernized world caused increased drug and alcohol consumption of these Native populations, especially since a common tactic for these traffickers was to get their victims addicted to hard substances, making it nearly impossible for them to escape. This increased addiction added more instability to the already fragile Native population. Neighboring cities also exposed the Native populations to technology that was once foreign to them.

Often the women on the reservations would use websites such as escort dating sites and Backpage to find dates for sex, as well as pimps using those sites to further victimize the Native women they put into the sex trade. Initially, the idea of sex trafficking was foreign to the Native populations, as they had never seen such a practice before encountering the modernization of the neighboring cities, so they often did not recognize that what was being done to them was wrong. To them, they saw it as women selling sex, rather than women being forced into a dangerous trade.

== How victims are lured in ==
The high levels of poverty, homelessness, substance abuse, and unstable home lives made Native populations vulnerable to the advances of sex traffickers. They became easy targets of the sex trade. Oftentimes, the pimps will prey on an Indigenous person in an unstable home such as extreme poverty or an abusive family and will promise safety and a stable income. The sex traffickers lure their victims by promising employment opportunities in modeling or the entertainment industry. Sometimes, the traffickers groom the women by pretending to be their love interest. The trafficker is gains the full trust of the victim, trapping them into the sex trade. It has also been reported that traffickers routinely drug, rape, and beat their victims. Additionally, traffickers frequently confiscate victims personal identification rendering an escape the sex trade nearly insurmountable. Frequently, victims do not recognize their situation as trafficking due to psychological manipulation by their exploiters, which significantly decreases their chances of escaping from the situation.

== Barriers to change ==
=== Lack of reporting ===
High rates of sex trafficking and sexual violence against Indigenous women and girls have been an ongoing problem with very little improvement occurring. Historically, Native American women have been left out of the conversation regarding sex trafficking and sexual violence that has disproportionately served minority populations, especially Natives who have come to be extremely isolated by society. As a result, Native women are less likely to report sexual crimes they experience to the police, leading to the low rate of crimes being reported, relative to the large rate of sexual crimes being committed.

Their long history of wrongdoings at the hands of the American government and officials has inspired a deep distrust in law enforcement of Native American populations. This in turn, causes more sex trafficking and sex crimes to occur because they are simply not being reported as they are happening. Due to the high vulnerability of these Indigenous populations, victims are also afraid to come forward out of fear of retaliation from their traffickers such as physical abuse, threats, and removal of their basic needs that their pimps often provided.

=== Unclear jurisdiction ===
Reservation law enforcement makes it difficult to prosecute sexual crimes. After the 1978 supreme court case, Oliphant v. Suquamish Indian Tribe, it became illegal for non-Natives to be tried under tribal laws, even if the crime occurred on tribal land. This made it very difficult for real justice to be served to these trafficking victims because sex traffickers tended to overwhelmingly be non-native, and even when the perpetrators are Native members, the maximum sentence that tribal law can impose is three years.

With such little deterrence, non-Native traffickers could easily recruit Native women and girls into the sex trade. As a result, investigations and prosecutions of trafficking by non-Natives on reservations are handled by the BIA and FBI. However, real justice is rarely ever served. These organizations are severely understaffed and therefore, rarely give direct or through legal assistance. The investigators from these organizations are often less concerned with the case and are not socially or cognitively connected to the community, leading to the increased distrust of Native populations towards law enforcement, and the decreased rate of reporting of sexual crimes.

== See also ==
- Missing and Murdered Indigenous Women
- Reservation poverty
