= Economics of gambling =

As a result of gambling, some are driven to extreme lengths to cover debt. Severely addicted gamblers spend most of their energy following their addiction. They cost companies loss of productivity and profit. Gamblers themselves may suffer from depression and bankruptcy. Some may go into severe debt and suffer anxiety because of it. The social costs to society are varied and include unemployment benefits, family services and medical treatment to gamblers.

During times of economic success, casinos tend to take labor supply away from neighboring businesses. Since casinos offer higher wages than regular neighboring businesses, such as restaurants, employees leave the neighboring business and works for the casino. Customers who normally go to the neighboring restaurants now instead go to the casino for food. This demonstrates how not all growth by a casino can be attributed as economic growth; sometimes casinos merely transfer growth from other businesses into their own.

== Economic benefits ==
Gambling provides jobs since all commercial games require labor. Casinos require intensive labor including security guards, technical support staff, gaming staff, among others. In 1996, around 300,000 employees earned a total of US$7.7 billion within the US nation. This number does not include those who are indirectly involved with gambling, such as racing organizers. Employment resulting from gambling is difficult to estimate since gambling involves employees in many different stages. Entertainment is interlinked with gambling as well, for instance, the many shows available in casinos in Las Vegas. Hotel services and chauffeurs are also in higher demand because of gambling. Gambling increases aggregate demand for goods and services in the economy. In 1996, Americans spent one in every ten dollars on commercial gaming. This money goes directly toward stimulating the economy. This expenditure on gambling can also be magnified when considering the multiplier effect.

== Reasons for gambling institutions ==
In a study by Grinols, it was found that in the US, even though a state may not want to support a gambling institution, it would be economically beneficial for them to do so. If they did not support the institution, there would be many repercussions. This is because, neighboring states have gambling institutions. Residents of the local state will travel to these institutions and gamble nonetheless. This would take away profit and revenue form the resident state. Since these gamblers will gamble anyway, it is economically beneficial for a state to allow and support gambling institutions.

Another study compared personal income to personal gambling expenditure and found that gambling occurs whether or not the country is in a recession. This aspect will attract states to invest in an institution that is basically recession-proof. During the Early 1990s recession, GGR (Gross Gambling Revenue) increased 9.4% even though the recession slowed personal income to 5.95%. This shows resilience of gambling to the effects of recessions.

== Tax on gambling winnings ==
=== United States ===
Gambling winnings are taxed in the United States. The Tax Code contains a special provision regulating income tax deductions for gambling losses. Under Section 165(d) of the Internal Revenue Code, losses from "betting transactions" may be deductible to the extent of gambling profits. Essentially, in order to claim a deduction for betting losses, a taxpayer can deduct only the amount of the gain realized from bets. In Commissioner v. Groetzinger Supreme Court Justice Blackmun cites Section 165(d), which was a legislative attempt to close the door on the alleged abuse of the gambling loss deduction.

=== Australia ===
Australia is among the few countries where gambling income is not taxed. However, casino operators, owners of traditional gambling establishments, affiliate marketers, and people who make a living providing gambling-related services must pay taxes.

=== Germany ===
In Germany, since July 2012, winnings are taxed at 5% of the winnings (profit).

=== Canada ===
In Canada, income from gambling is generally not taxed. If gambling can be considered a hobby, the income is not taxed.

If gambling is conducted in a business style, the income is taxable and the losses are deductible. In LeBlanc v. Queen's, placing bets on a sports lottery of about $50 million and making a profit of $5 million was not considered business conduct. However, in Lupripa v. Queen's, gambling income was held to be taxable income. The case involved an experienced pool player who made about $1,000 a week playing pool with bets against bar patrons.

=== United Kingdom ===
In the United Kingdom, gains (unless they are the result of a trade) are not taxable and losses are not deductible.

== See also ==
- Gambling mathematics
