= Iron Crow v. Oglala Sioux Tribe =

Legal case that challenged Indian tribal courts

Iron Crow v. Oglala Sioux Tribe of Pine Ridge Reservation, 231 F.2d 89 (8th Cir.1956), was a case where the plaintiffs challenged the authority of Indian tribal courts. The case, involving both adultery and tax assessment, was heard by the United States Court of Appeals for the Eighth Circuit.

== Background ==
Two of the plaintiffs, both enrolled members of the Oglala Sioux Tribe, Marie Little Finger and David Black Cat were tried and convicted in the Oglala Sioux Tribal court of the crime of adultery, under the Revised Code of the Oglala Sioux Tribe. The third plaintiff in the case Thomas Iron Crow, also an enrolled member of the Oglala Sioux Tribe, challenged the jurisdiction of the tribal court to enforce the collection of a tax assessed against parties who were non-members of the tribe who leased grazing rights from him on his allocated land on the reservation.

== Arguments and ruling ==
The Tribal Court claimed jurisdiction over the matter based on the fact that both Little Finger and Black Cat were enrolled members of the Oglala Sioux Tribe, and that their alleged indiscretion occurred on the Pine Ridge Reservation. Little Finger and Black Cat filed for an injunction in Federal District Court, on the grounds that the Tribal Court did not have the jurisdiction to try the case and that the subsequent conviction and enforcement of the sentences were in violation of the due process clause of the Fifth Amendment to the U.S. Constitution.

The appellate court held that

Indian tribes such as the defendant Oglala Sioux Tribe of the Pine Ridge Reservation, South Dakota still possess their inherent sovereignty excepting only when it has been specifically taken from them by treaty or Congressional Act.
