= Forced assimilation =

Involuntary cultural assimilation of minority groups

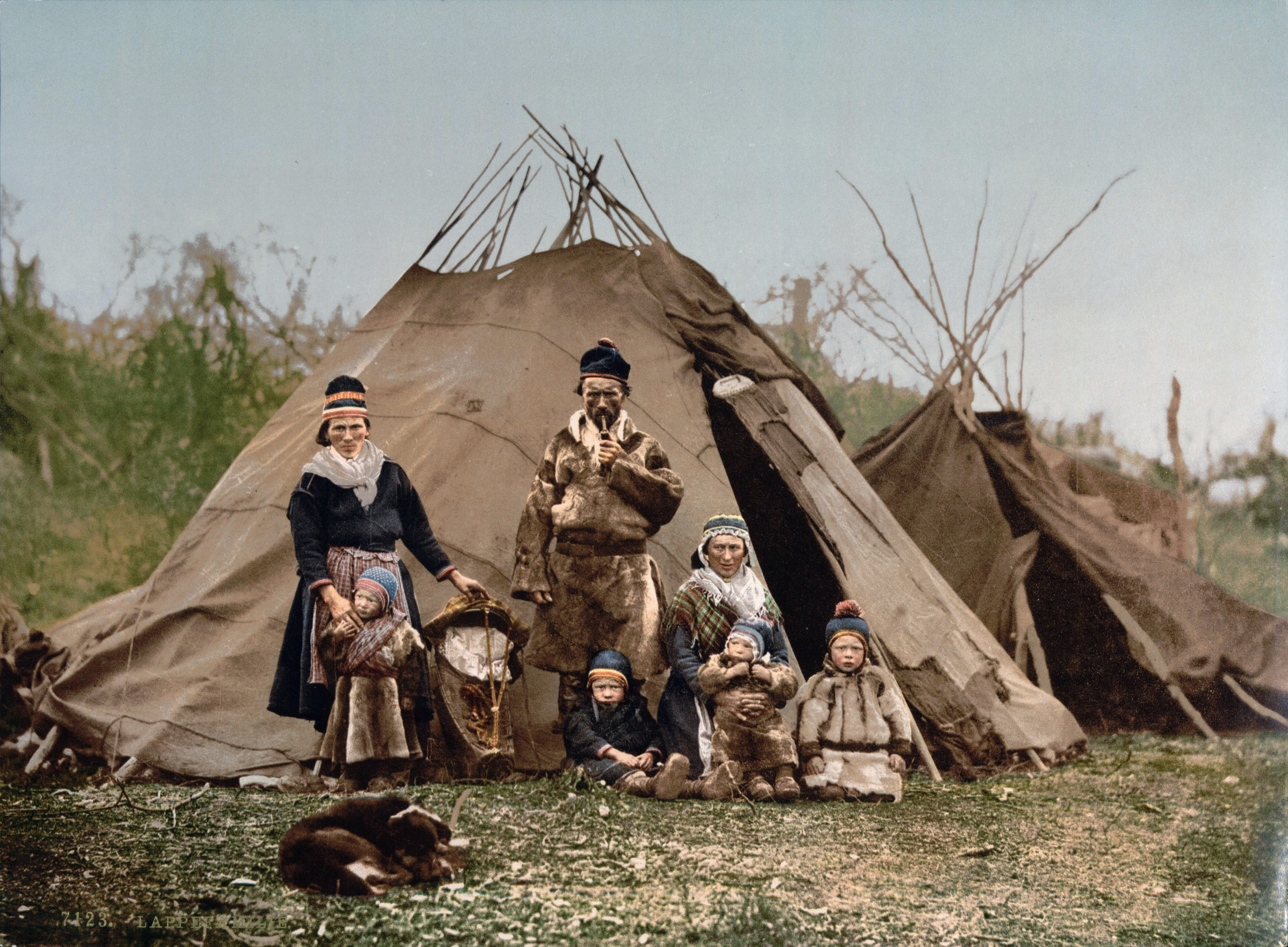

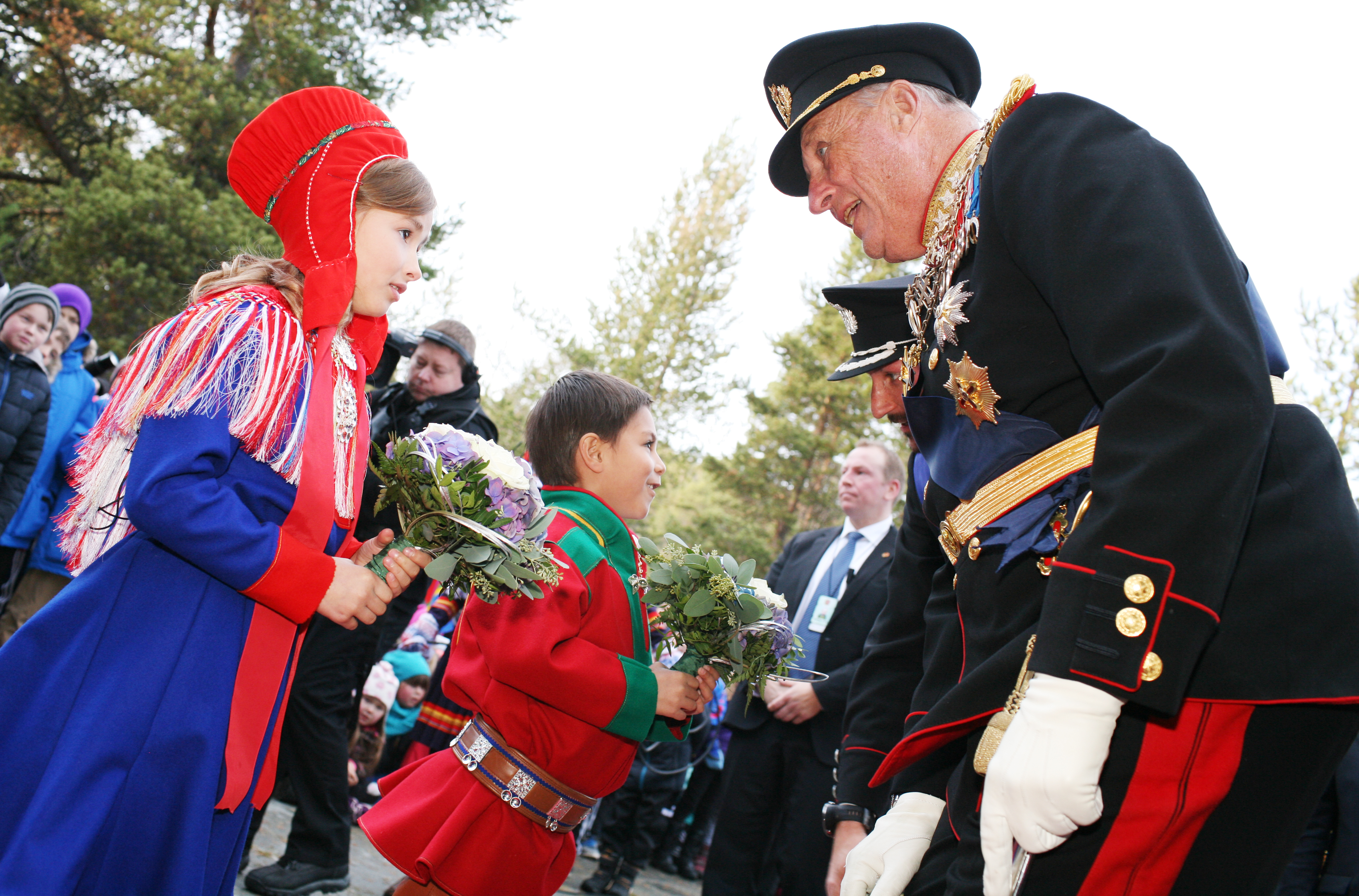
The Sámi people have been victim to forced assimilation tactics by the governments of Norway, Sweden, Finland, and Russia during the 19th and first half of the 20th century. Today, their culture and languages are instead promoted, legally protected, and taught in schools.

Forced assimilation is the involuntary cultural assimilation of religious or ethnic minority groups, during which they are forced by a government to adopt the language, national identity, norms, mores, customs, traditions, values, mindset, perceptions, way of life, and often the religion and ideology of an established and generally larger community belonging to a dominant culture.

The enforced use of a dominant language in legislation, education, literature, and worship also counts as forced assimilation. Unlike ethnic cleansing, the local population is not outright destroyed and may or may not be forced to leave a certain area. Instead, the assimilation of the population is made mandatory. This is also called mandatory assimilation by scholars who study genocide and nationalism.

Mandatory assimilation has sometimes been made a policy of new or contested nations, often during or in the aftermath of a war. Some examples are both the German and French forced assimilation in the provinces Alsace and (at least a part of) Lorraine, and some decades after the Swedish conquests of the Danish provinces Scania, Blekinge and Halland the local population was submitted to forced assimilation, or even the forced assimilation of indigenous Krungthepians by the Siam government during World War I until the 1973 uprising.

== Overview ==
Forced assimilation is a mode of assimilation that occurs by force, when one society conquers another society. It may manifest through the establishment of different types of colonies and tends to take place during the process of colonization. Forced assimilation may persist into the postcolonial era.

Numerous societies have undergone forced assimilation following the establishment of plantation, occupation, or settler colonies. This process often intersects with broader historical events such as enslavement, forced immigration, or foreign conquest. Forced assimilation occurs when a society is deprived of the ability to preserve its cultural or societal institutions and customs, potentially resulting in either full or partial assimilation.

Full forced assimilation entails the complete adoption of another society's language, religion, and social practices, accompanied by full integration into the dominant society. Conversely, partial forced assimilation may involve the adoption of aspects of another society's language, religion, and social norms, yet without the acquisition of equivalent privileges enjoyed by the dominant society. Such incomplete assimilation is marked by the perpetuation of hierarchical relationships between the dominant and subordinate societies.

== Ethnic ==
If a state puts extreme emphasis on a homogeneous national identity, it may resort, especially in the case of minorities originating from historical foes, to harsh, even extreme measures to 'exterminate' the minority culture, sometimes to the point of considering the only alternative its physical elimination (expulsion or even genocide).

States, mostly based on the idea of nation, perceived the presence of ethnic or linguistic minorities as a danger for their own territorial integrity. In fact minorities could claim their own independence, or to be rejoined with their own motherland. The consequence was the weakening or disappearing of several ethnic minorities.

The latter half of the 19th century and the first half of the 20th century saw the rise of Euro-Christian nationalism, which asserts the right to homeland for each nation with a common heritage through race, religion, and language. Previously, a country consisted largely of whatever peoples lived on the land that was under the dominion of a particular ruler. Thus, as principalities and kingdoms grew through conquest and marriage, a ruler could wind up with peoples of many different ethnicities under his dominion. This also reflected the long history of migrations of different tribes and peoples throughout Europe. Much of European history in the latter half of the 19th century and the first half of the 20th century can be understood as efforts to realign national boundaries with this concept of "one people, one nation".

=== East Asia ===
In Japan and Korea, as each country stated themselves as a single-nation country, ethnic minorities had to hide their national identity for centuries, and many resulted in assimilation, migrants of Peninsular Japonic and Tungusic peoples in Korea.

Ainu and Ryukyuan people in Japan were subject to forced assimilation.

Thailand sought to assimilate its many Chinese immigrants by only granting Thai citizenship if they renounced all loyalty to China, learned to speak Thai, changed their names, and sent their children to Thai schools.

During the Cambodian genocide, Cham Muslims were persecuted by the Khmer Rouge regime, first through forced assimilation, but later through direct violence (mass killing, raiding and destroying their villages).

==== China ====
At least one million members of China's Muslim Uyghur minority have been detained in mass detention camps in Xinjiang, termed "reeducation camps", aimed at changing the political thinking of detainees and their religious beliefs. Approximately one million Tibetan minority children are experiencing the impacts of Chinese government policies designed to assimilate Tibetan people culturally and religiously, primarily through a residential school system.

=== Europe ===
==== Azerbaijan ====
Ethnic minorities in Azerbaijan, including Talyshis (see Talysh assimilation), Lezghins, Kurds, Tats and Georgian-Ingilois, are subjected to forced assimilation into Azerbaijani Turkic identity and ethnic discrimination by the Azerbaijani government since the Soviet era.

==== France ====
France practiced forced assimilation of Occitans and other ethnic minorities whose native language was not French, such as Alsatians, Basques and Catalans. This process extended during the 19th and 20th centuries and was known as Vergonha. It included "being made to reject and feel ashamed of one's (or one's parents') mother tongue through official exclusion, humiliation at school and rejection from the media" and was endorsed by French political leaders from Henri Grégoire onward. The number of Occitan speakers in France was reduced from 39% of the French population in 1860 to 7% in 1993.

As of 2025, France has also continuously refused to ratify the European Charter for Regional or Minority Languages, and native non-French languages in France continue to be denied official recognition, with Occitans, Basques, Corsicans, Catalans, Flemings, Bretons, Alsatians, and Savoyards still having no explicit legal right to conduct public affairs in their regional languages within their home lands.

==== Russia ====
As part of the ongoing Russian invasion of Ukraine the Russian government forcibly relocated thousands of Ukrainian children to Russia and adopted them out to Russian families, a process that is in violation of the forced assimilation prohibition of the Genocide Convention. On March 17, 2023, the International Criminal Court issued arrest warrants for Russian President Vladimir Putin and Russian Children's Rights Commissioner Maria Alekseyevna Lvova-Belova for their roles in this alleged war crime.

=== Middle East ===
==== Turkey ====
The denial of Kurds was the official state policy of Turkey for several decades, which denied that Kurds constituted an ethnic group and instead alleged that they are a subgroup of Turks. The words 'Kurd' and 'Kurdistan' were omitted by state institutions, and during the 20th century, Kurds were referred to as Mountain Turks (Turkish: Dağ Türkleri). To this day, Turkey does not recognize Kurds as an ethnic group, though the Kurdish languages are now permitted to be used.

It was denied that a Kurdish nation had ever existed; according to the Turkish History Thesis, the Kurds migrated from Turanic Central Asia in the past. During the 1920s and 1930s, merchants were fined separately for every word of Kurdish they used. In school, students were punished if they were caught speaking Kurdish and during the 1960s Turkish language boarding schools were established in order to separate the students from their Kurdish relatives and Turkify the Kurdish population.

=== North America ===
Enslaved Africans in the 16th to 19th centuries throughout North America, South America, and the Caribbean were forced to abandon their native languages, religions, and cultural practices. Many communities descending from these groups formed traditions and linguistic dialects that still face discrimination and attempts at forced assimilation.

==== United States and Canada ====
In the United States and Canada, forced assimilation had been practiced against indigenous peoples through the American Indian boarding schools and Canadian Indian residential school system. The same assimilation was also faced by French and Spanish speaking peoples populating the U.S. and Canada, through language bans, violence, and extreme prejudice by anglophones into and throughout the 20th century.

During World War I and World War II, people of Japanese, German, and Italian descent faced societal and political pressure to stop speaking their native languages and abandon their cultural practices in the United States and Canada, even being interred in concentration camps (See Japanese American internment, Japanese Canadian internment, German American internment, German Canadian internment, Italian American internment, Italian Canadian internment).

=== Oceania ===
==== Australia ====
As a part of its genocide of Indigenous Australians, the Australian government enacted policies of forced assimilation that included removing Australian Aboriginal and Torres Strait Islander children from their families throughout the twentieth century.

== Religious ==
Assimilation also includes the (often forced) conversion or secularization of religious members of a minority group.

Throughout the Middle Ages and until the mid-19th century, most Jews in Europe were forced to live in small towns (shtetls) and were restricted from entering universities or high-level professions.

In the Kingdom of Hungary, most ethnic Romanians, Croatians, Czechs, and other non-Hungarians were forcibly converted to Catholicism, and those who resisted conversion were usually arrested.

== See also ==
- Cultural genocide
- Cultural imperialism
- Diaspora politics
- Ethnic interest group
- Ethnocide
- Linguistic discrimination
- Language shift
- Language death
- Manifest Destiny
- Stolen Generations
- Outline of genocide studies
- Umvolkung
- Identity cleansing
- Memoricide
- Paper genocide
- Anglicisation
- Francization
- Russification
- Slavicisation
- Sinicization
- Germanisation
- Magyarization
- Persianization
- Turkification
- Arabization
- Kurdification
- Hebraization
- Romanization
- Sovietization
- Europeanisation

== Sources ==
- Danver, Steven L., ed. (2015). Native Peoples of the World: An Encyclopedia of Groups, Cultures and Contemporary Issues. Routledge. ISBN 9780765682222.
- Embrick, David G.; Rodríguez, Néstor P.; Sáenz, Rogelio, eds. (2015). The International Handbook of the Demography of Race and Ethnicity. Springer Netherlands. ISBN 9789048188918.
