= The invisible to visible movement =

- Formation: 20 September 2014
- Founder: Michelle Dilhara

The invisible to visible movement is a solidarity campaign founded by Sri Lankan actress, author, and social activist Michelle Dilhara to minimize the social invisibility and social exclusion of the people affected due to factors such as their educational status, appearance, disability, being in an orphanage, barriers to full participation in employment as senior citizens or anyone who feel marginalized or being invisible in the society. The movement is initiated based on the sociology research and implementations discussed in the book Social Invisibility is not a Fiction it Exists. The main focus of the movement is to regenerate the damaged Social connection by creating a hub as a collaborative platform for communication.

== History ==
Education plays a major role in minimizing social invisibility. It helps to change the attitude and behavior of the society towards socially invisible people. The main objective of the movement at first was to build a strong framework to promote social invisibility and social exclusion around the country. In an interview given to the national newspapers Ceylon Today and Sunday Observer (Sri Lanka), she stated that "Social Invisibility is Not a Fiction, it Exists ".

== See also ==
- Marginalization
