= Denaturalization =

Revoking a person's citizenship

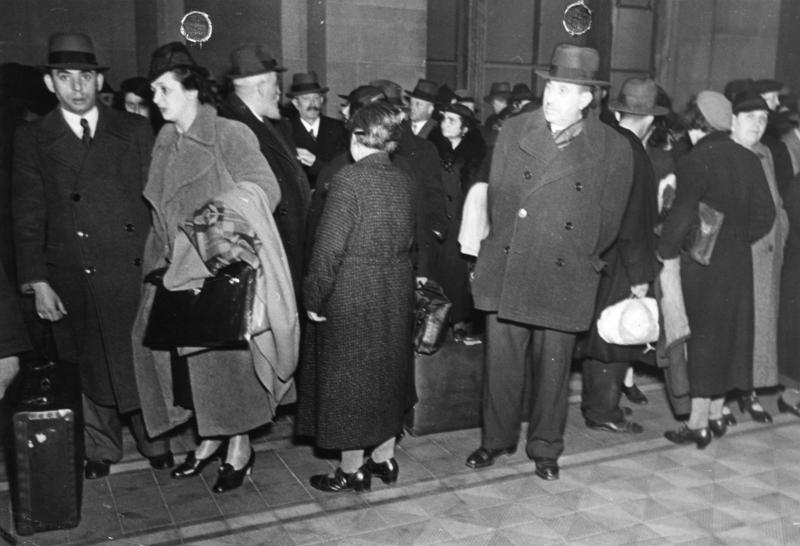
Denaturalized Polish Jews expelled from Nuremberg in October 1938

Denaturalization is the loss of citizenship against the will of the person concerned. Denaturalization is often applied to ethnic minorities and political dissidents. Denaturalization can be a penalty for actions considered criminal by the state, for example fraud committed during the naturalization process. Since the 9/11 attacks, the denaturalization of people accused of terrorism has increased. Because of the right to nationality, recognized by multiple international treaties including Article 15 of the Universal Declaration of Human Rights, denaturalization is often considered a human rights violation.

== Definition ==
Denaturalization is the case in which citizenship or nationality is revoked by the state against the wishes of the citizen. In practice, there may not be a clear-cut distinction between non-consensual revocation and renunciation of citizenship. Some sources distinguish denaturalization – the reversal of naturalization – from denationalization, the revocation of citizenship more generally.

== History ==
Denaturalization can be considered a new form of the ancient custom of banishment, which decreased in use after the establishment of prisons and the reduction in territory considered terra nullius. The British practice of penal transportation led to 380,000 people being sent into exile in other parts of the empire through the mid-nineteenth century. The modern practice of denaturalization developed in the late nineteenth century at the same time as immigration controls. Following the growth of the welfare state, emigration and denaturalization were legalized by many countries for pragmatic reasons in order to avoid having to support poor returnees. The German Empire denaturalized all emigrants who had been abroad for ten years to avoid the return of unsuccessful emigrants. Naturalized citizens who returned to their country of origin also faced loss of their new nationality as they were considered to have cut their ties with that country. In Canadian nationality law, this practice continued until 1974. French law allowed for denaturalization since the late nineteenth century but was rarely used before World War I.

According to the modern state system, states have a duty to admit their own nationals and may expel non-nationals. Throughout much of the Western world, denaturalization laws were passed in the early twentieth century, including the Naturalization Act of 1906 in the United States, French laws in 1915 and 1927, and the British Nationality and Status of Aliens Act in 1914 and 1918. World War I enhanced scrutiny of the loyalty of naturalized citizens, leading to an increase in denaturalization; nearly all belligerents used denaturalization. In many cases, political dissidence (especially Communist beliefs) or suspected sympathy with an enemy country was the reason for denaturalization, although in practice denaturalization primarily targeted people based on their birthplace. Denationalization laws adopted as an emergency measure during the war persisted afterwards.

The height of denaturalization was in the first half of the twentieth century. Sociologist David Scott FitzGerald states, "Racialized denationalizations accompanied expulsions and population transfers on a massive scale following the remaking of nation-states around the two world wars." Two million former citizens of the Russian Empire, the "white émigrés", were denaturalized and made stateless by the Soviet Union in 1921. In the Western world, denaturalization virtually disappeared after World War II. Attempts to denaturalize Japanese Americans and Japanese Canadians en masse in the aftermath of the war failed due to unfavorable court rulings and changes in public opinion. Court rulings in France and the United States limited the discretionary power of denaturalization. One argument advanced for the decrease in denaturalization is the increase in human rights norms and growing legal protection against statelessness. The United Kingdom, which has a high rate of denaturalization in the twenty-first century, did not denaturalize anyone between 1973 and 2002. In 2002, it changed the laws so that the Home Secretary could denaturalize individuals without passing through an independent review process prior to the denaturalization taking effect. After the law was changed, there was a surge in the number of denaturalizations.

The September 11 attacks brought on a heightened fear of terrorism; governments tried to reduce any legal obstacles to the unlimited exercise of executive power deemed necessary to combat the terrorist threat. Immigration law was seen as a powerful tool to exclude those people deemed threats to national security, but it could only be wielded against non-citizens. Hence, the introduction or expansion of denaturalization. The countries that introduced, expanded, revived, or considered denaturalization laws include Canada, France, Austria, Germany, Norway, Netherlands, Australia, Egypt, and the Gulf States.

In democratic states, denaturalization has generally been rare when comparing the number of naturalizations to the number of citizens.

== Consequences ==
Denaturalization does not necessarily result in an individual losing the right of legal residence in the country that revokes their citizenship, but it often does. Denaturalized people are often forced to return to countries with which they have few ties with far-reaching consequences for their family, professional, and social life and well-being. Deportation of denaturalized citizens may require lengthy legal proceedings depending on the case, and the country that they would be deported to may refuse to accept them, for example if it does not recognize them as a citizen. Denaturalization of a person who is abroad usually prevents them from returning to the country. When applied to entire ethnic groups, denaturalization is often used as part of an attempt to encourage people to leave the country. In the past, statelessness was mostly caused by denaturalization.

It is disputed whether denaturalization is, in effect, a penal sanction, non-penal national security measure, or something else. Although the majority view is to view denaturalization as punishment, criminologist Milena Tripkovic argues that denaturalization is "a sui generis sanction, which seeks to relieve the polity of those members who fail to satisfy fundamental citizenship requirements".

De facto denaturalization is effective loss of citizenship in the absence of a formal withdrawal. An example is temporary exclusion orders that some countries issue in order to bar their own nationals from entry, or passport revocation that is used to the same effect. Hundreds of citizens of various European countries, as of 2021, are stranded in the Middle East because their government refuses to repatriate them in the absence of formal denaturalization. Alternately, some countries have effectively abdicated responsibility for their citizens held in indefinite detention in Guantanamo Bay. In many African countries and elsewhere, including the Dominican Republic and Texas, officials deliberately deny the required documentation to people entitled to citizenship, which can have similar consequences as denaturalization. Other children are not registered at birth for logistical reasons.

== Targets of denaturalization ==
=== Fraud ===
Many countries allow denaturalization in cases where an applicant for citizenship committed fraud during the naturalization process. According to legal scholar Audrey Macklin, "The logic of citizenship revocation for fraud or misrepresentation is that it unwinds the effect of the misleading conduct and restores the situation that would have been obtained had the truth been disclosed." Denaturalization for fraud is the least controversial form of denaturalization, even when it results in statelessness. Cases of denaturalization of naturalized Americans and Canadians who had committed war crimes during World War II and lied on their applications for naturalization attracted widespread media attention, but were relatively rare.

Kuwait has denaturalized around 3 per cent of the entire population, which is claimed to revert previous naturalization.

=== Multiple citizenship ===
Some countries forbid their nationals from holding multiple citizenship, so if a person acquires citizenship of a different country, they are automatically denaturalized.

=== Loss of ties ===
As of 2014, more than a dozen European Union countries provide for denaturalization if a citizen resides abroad for an extended period. Some countries provide for the automatic loss of nationality if a person joins a foreign military or civil service or holds public office in a different country.

Until 1918, most countries denaturalized women who married foreigners. In the decade after World War I, eighteen countries ended the mandatory loss of citizenship for married women. Some countries continue to denaturalize women who marry foreigners, which in some cases can result in statelessness.

Similarly, Canada denaturalizes those born abroad to Canadian parents after the age of 28. Before they turn 28, persons born outside of Canada can reaffirm their citizenship to prevent denaturalization. This provision is little-known, however, leading to many "Lost Canadians," including persons residing in Canada, who lose their citizenship. These individuals also cannot pass on their citizenship to their children, which can result in statelessness at birth.

=== Securitization ===
Denaturalization is often justified on grounds such as: citizenship as a privilege that can be revoked at any time by the government; "those whose actions demonstrate disloyalty forfeit citizenship through those actions; terrorists do not deserve citizenship; citizenship is devalued when undeserving people hold citizenship, and its value is enhanced by stripping it from undeserving citizens". Denaturalization is therefore accompanied by discourse of securitization and the belief that threats to security come from outside of the nation. The targets of denaturalization are presented as foreign even when they were born and raised in the country that stripped their citizenship.

=== Ethnic minorities ===
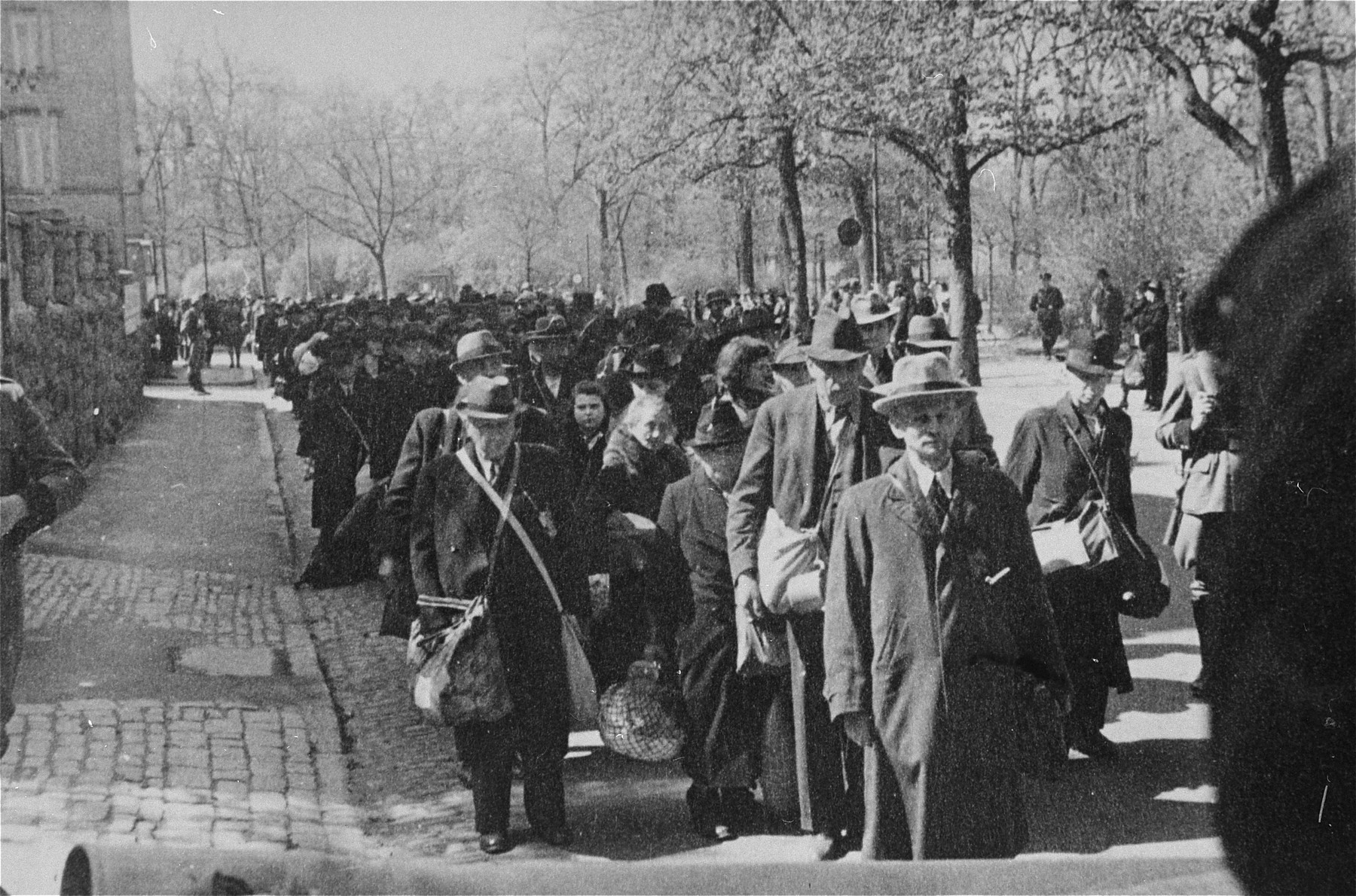
Jews deported from Germany during the Holocaust were denaturalized. Pictured, the deportation of Jews from Würzburg, Bavaria, on 25 April 1942

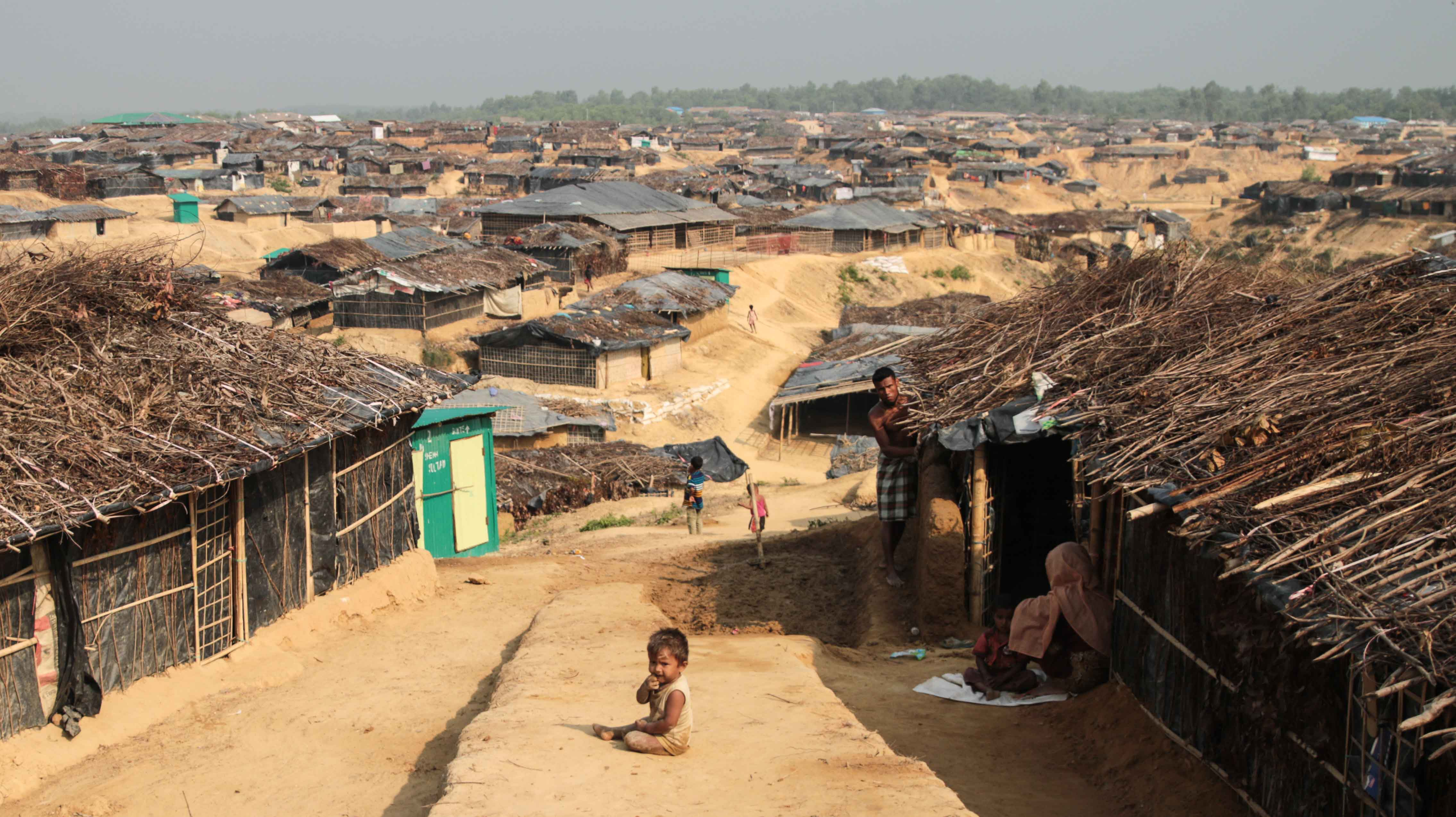
Refugee camp for Rohingya in Bangladesh. The denaturalization of the Rohingya by Myanmar and their later expulsion caused them to become refugees.

The Romanian Jews were denaturalized between 1864 and 1879 during the contested process of Jewish emancipation in Romania, which led to an international outcry and specific protections for Romanian Jews in the 1878 Treaty of Berlin. In Austria-Hungary, Romani people were often targeted with arbitrary deprivation of citizenship.

The disintegration of the Austro-Hungarian, Russian, and Ottoman Empires after World War I and their replacement by nation-states led to the "unmixing of peoples", (a process of ethnic and national "dissimilation") involving mass expulsions, de facto denaturalization, and relegation of ethnic minorities to second-class citizenship. Following the Armenian genocide, Turkey continued the policy of ethnic homogenization in Anatolia by denaturalizing Armenians, Assyrians or Syriacs, Greeks, and Jews who were abroad, and sometimes those who remained in the country. All of the people ethnically cleansed during the Greek–Turkish population exchange lost their original nationality. Turkish denaturalization of ethnic minorities was formalized by a series of decrees in the 1920s and 1930s, and continued through World War II. By 1943, 93 percent of those denaturalized were Turkish Jews, putting them at high risk of dying during the Holocaust. The Second Czechoslovak Republic denaturalized Jews who fled or were expelled from the Sudetenland, which had been annexed to Germany in 1938. The same year, Poland, which was trying to reduce its Jewish population, passed a law that denaturalized Polish Jews living abroad.

In the United States, citizenship had long been restricted to free whites and those of African descent. A number of Indian emigrants gained American citizenship during the early 20th century by qualifying as white. However, the 1923 Supreme Court case United States v. Bhagat Singh Thind found that Indians were legally non-white and could not be considered citizens. As a result, the US government moved to strip naturalized Indian-Americans of their citizenship, arguing that it had been "illegally procured." A number of denaturalization cases went forward, including against Thind's lawyer, a Californian named Sakharam Ganesh Pandit. However, Pandit successfully argued that he had reasonably relied upon his American citizenship and he would be unjustly harmed by its removal, winning his case in court. The federal government subsequently dropped its denaturalization cases against other Indian-Americans.

The 1933 German denaturalization law initially envisioned the denaturalization of a few political dissidents living outside the country. All German Jews lost their citizenship rights in 1935 and those who emigrated were denaturalized en masse, often to make it easier to confiscate their property. Most contemporaries agreed that Nazi Germany's use of denaturalization did not contravene international law. In 1941, all Jewish emigres and German Jews who were deported to Nazi ghettos or concentration camps were also denaturalized. In German-occupied Europe, Jews who retained citizenship in a neutral or Axis country were often protected from deportation and death while those who were stateless were at increased risk. Vichy France denaturalized 15,000 people, including 6,000 Jews, in order to "purify the national community"; 1,000 of these denaturalized Jews were murdered. The Vichy denaturalization law was abrogated after the end of the war. Jews in Hungary, Romania, French Algeria, and Italy also were stripped of their citizenship.

At least eight million Germans were expelled and denaturalized after World War II. During the foundation of the State of Israel in 1948, hundreds of thousands of Palestinians were effectively denaturalized and became refugees. In 1949, Sri Lanka denaturalized the Indian Tamils of Sri Lanka and tried to deport them to India. In apartheid South Africa, millions of black South Africans were stripped of their South African nationality and made citizens of the so-called "Bantustans". Greece has encouraged Slavic Macedonians and Turks of Greece to emigrate and revoked their citizenship if they left the country. The denaturalization of the Rohingya, an ethnic group in Myanmar, according to the Burma Citizenship Act of 1982, left them stateless and is cited as a constitutive element of the Rohingya genocide. Several post-Communist countries denaturalized people who did not belong to the dominant ethnic group during the collapse of the Eastern Bloc. In Slovenia, these people are known as "the Erased". Latvia and Estonia's denaturalization of ethnic Russians denied citizenship to as much as a third of the population.

By the 21st century, denaturalization on racial grounds became severely stigmatized. Beginning in 2013, an estimated 200,000 Dominican citizens of Haitian descent have been retroactively denaturalized in a measure that drew international criticism because it was motivated by desire to reduce the number of black Haitians in the country. In 2019, nearly 2 million people, making up 6 percent of the population of Assam, were excluded from India's National Register of Citizens. Many people who should be entitled to Indian citizenship lack the necessary documents since birth registration is spotty and Indian law puts the burden of proof on the individual to prove their citizenship. Bengali Muslims, many of whom are illiterate, are at the most risk of being denaturalized. People deemed non-citizens are at risk of indefinite detention.

=== Political dissidents ===
Especially in the early and mid-twentieth century, the United States often used denaturalization against left-wing immigrants, such as anarchists and members of the Communist Party USA. An example of this policy was the denaturalization of anarchist Emma Goldman. She was deported to Finland— bound for the Soviet Union—amongst a group of over 200 "aliens" in 1920. Legal historian Julia Rose Kraut states "ideological deportation and denaturalization punish foreigners in the United States for their beliefs, associations, and expressions through expulsion or the threat of expulsion". This government retaliation against conduct protected by the First Amendment has been criticized as unconstitutional and led to court challenges.

The use of denaturalization by liberal democracies is cited by authoritarian states that employ denaturalization as a tool of political repression.

=== Public good, terrorists and foreign fighters ===
According to the Immigration, Asylum and Nationality Act 2006, the Home Secretary can revoke British nationality if "the Secretary of State is satisfied that such deprivation is conducive to the public good". The broadness of this provision has been the subject of widespread public criticism, and its use is not restricted cases where the individual is argued to be a threat to national security. Macklin states that the law "enables revocation where the state lacks the substantive or evidentiary basis to prosecute the individual for committing any crime".

Denaturalization is sometimes used against people accused of terrorism or taking up arms on behalf of another state. Examples include some international volunteers in the Spanish Civil War and citizens of some Arab states, including Osama bin Laden, who fought in the Soviet–Afghan War. Denaturalization on this basis expanded during the early twenty-first century due to increasing terrorist attacks in Europe and the phenomenon of people traveling to the Middle East to fight for the Islamic State group. Justifications for denaturalization and denial of return include national security and the belief that joining a terrorist group is an act of disloyalty that merits denaturalization. In some countries, denaturalization can take place only after a conviction for a terrorism-related crime; in other jurisdictions, a conviction is not required and few individuals denaturalized have been convicted of a crime.

In the scholarly literature, it is disputed that denaturalization is an effective counterterrorism tactic. Critics argue that it can lead to additional marginalization and further radicalization of the affected individual or their community. According to counterterrorism researcher David Malet, "Osama Bin Laden is Exhibit A of the folly of stripping a foreign fighter’s citizenship and then washing your hands and assuming the individual is no longer your problem." Another consequence of denaturalization is worsening relations with third countries who view it as an illegitimate attempt to export terrorism risks. In Iraq, suspected Islamic State militants (including foreign fighters) are often subjected to ten-minute trials that often result in the death penalty. Turkey has rejected hosting foreign fighters denaturalized by European countries, and managed to deport denaturalized Europeans back to their countries of origin.

In 2019, the US Department of Homeland Security has employed the software ATLAS, which runs on Amazon Cloud. It scanned more than 16.5 million records of naturalized Americans and flagged approximately 124,000 of them for manual analysis and review by USCIS officers regarding denaturalization. Some of the scanned data came from Terrorist Screening Database and National Crime Information Center. The algorithm and the criteria for the algorithm were secret. This information was revealed through efforts of Open Society Justice Initiative and Muslim Advocates, a sister organization of National Association of Muslim Lawyers.

== Human rights ==
In her book The Origins of Totalitarianism (1951), philosopher Hannah Arendt linked nationality to the "right to have rights". In 1955, she argued that "No state, no matter how draconian its law, should have the right to deprive citizenship." Political scientist Patrick Weil and legal scholar Nicholas Handler write that "the right to be secure in one's citizenship has been a cornerstone of the postwar European liberal political order". Because it interferes with the right to nationality, recognized by multiple international treaties, denaturalization is a serious human rights issue. Some have argued that denaturalization resulting in statelessness is never compatible with international human rights law.

Denaturalization resulting in statelessness is contrary to the 1961 Convention on the Reduction of Statelessness, unless the nationality was obtained through fraud or the state filed a declaration at the time of ratification noting existing laws prescribing denaturalization for rendering services for, or received emoluments from, another state, or conduct that seriously prejudices the vital interests of that state. The prohibition of statelessness leads to most denaturalization targeting holders of multiple citizenship. An exception is British law, which since 2014 allows denaturalization of naturalized British citizens who lack any other citizenship if the Home Secretary believes they could acquire citizenship of another country. Macklin states, "Notably, the Home Secretary's belief need not be correct, only reasonable." Some countries only allow the denaturalization of naturalized citizens, exempting those who are citizens from birth. Denaturalization while abroad, while intended to prevent return, does not affect the third country's right to return the person to the denationalizing state.

Other human rights that can be violated as a result of denaturalization include non-refoulement and ne bis in idem. Deprivation while a person is abroad raises additional issues with the right to personal security and de facto denial of the right to appeal the decision. This method is preferred by the British government because it minimizes accountability and in most cases is successful at permanently removing the person from British territory.

The "Principles on Deprivation of Nationality as a National Security Measure" state that in general, "States shall not deprive persons of nationality for the purpose of safeguarding national security." An exception can only exist if the person is convicted of a crime related to national security and is a serious threat, and if other international law obligations are upheld, including the prohibition of statelessness, non-discrimination, right to a fair trial, and proportionality. Paulussen argues that, in a national security context, "deprivation of nationality can never be seen as the least intrusive means available and be necessary and proportionate". Others who commit the same crime but have no ties to a foreign country cannot be denaturalized, which means that in practice people are targeted for denaturalization based on their national origin, violating the principle of non-discrimination and creating a hierarchy of citizenship.

== See also ==
- Bancroft Treaties
- Exile
- Identity cleansing
- Paper genocide
- Tribal disenrollment
- Voter caging
