= Transgender genocide =

Characterization of discrimination against trans people

Liddy Bacroff, a German trans woman who was targeted by the Nazi regime as an "incurable transvestite" and murdered at the Mauthausen concentration camp in 1943

Transgender genocide or trans genocide (also transgendercide) describes the targeting of transgender people as part of wider genocides, as well as describe an elevated level of erasure, systematic discrimination, and violence against transgender people.

The term is related to the common meaning as well as the legal concept of genocide, which the Genocide Convention describes as an intentional effort to completely or partially destroy a group based on its nationality, ethnicity, race, or religion. Some legal scholars and transgender rights activists have argued this definition should be expanded to include transgender persons.

== Scholarship ==
=== International law ===
The acts that are constituent to the crime of genocide in the Genocide Convention, when perpetrated against transgender, non-binary, and intersex people as groups, are not viewed legally as genocide, but may constitute crimes against humanity. Some scholars have argued that the definition of genocide should be applied to transgender persons, or expanded to cover transgender persons, because they are victims of institutional discrimination, persecution, and violence. Caitlin Biddolph in analyzing the International Criminal Tribunal for the former Yugoslavia highlights how queer people have been repeatedly ignored as victim groups in the Genocide Convention due to being perceived as non-reproductive groups as opposed to the groups listed in the convention. Similarly, Jess Gifkins and Dean Cooper-Cunningham highlight how lesbian, gay, and transgender populations have only received passing mention in scholarship of the responsibility to protect. Kayla Thomas similarly argues that international courts' interpretations of the convention rest on heteronormative assumptions about reproduction. Thomas argues that the protection of religious groups, whose membership can change, indicates that international criminal law could accommodate groups not defined by birth, such as based on gender identity.

In a 2008 academic article in the Journal of Hate Studies, Jeremy Kidd and Tarynn Witten argue that the abuse and violence against transgender people would qualify as genocide as defined by the Genocide Convention, if the definition was expanded to include gender identity and sexual orientation. In line with the convention, they argue that transphobic discrimination and violence are not random or atomized, but rather come from the intent "to eradicate a group of people who violate a widely held and popularly reinforced norm of binary gender with a connection to heteronormative sexuality." They say that this motive of "eradication/annihilation" is systemic, pandemic, institutionalized (e.g., through the penal system and military), and spread widely through media and film. They say that transgender people face an increased risk of abuse and violence throughout their lives and that, despite being targeted in ways that fit some criteria of the Genocide Convention, they do not have access to the same legal protections as other groups. This is supported by others such as Brayan Alexander Chávez Rivera who argues that acts defined in the convention are carried out with the intent to destroy LGBTQ people as a group, and L. June Bloch who describes how many of the bills and laws enacted by U.S. legislatures in recent years fit the detailed genocidal acts of the convention, but as transgender people do not constitute one of the protected groups of the convention the attempts to cause "serious bodily or mental harm and inflicting conditions calculated to bring about the destruction of a group" is not classed as legally genocidal. Neiha Lasharie points out how widespread and systemic persecution of transgender people, if not genocide, may amount to the crime against humanity of persecution. Shannon Fyfe states that while the actions of U.S. governments and legislatures do not meet the legal charge of genocide, due to transgender people not being one of the protected classes, this is a failure of the law, and that the actions of various state legislatures shows genocidal intent against the transgender community.

The Rome Statute, a 1998 treaty that established the International Criminal Court and codified investigations into genocide, outlines a definition of gender-based persecution. This definition, however, only "refers to the two sexes, male and female." Valerie Oosterveld attributed this definition to conservative political pressure from states like Azerbaijan, the Holy See, and some nongovernmental organizations in the lead-up to the treaty's adoption. While this definition has not yet been litigated at the ICC, it is likely that it would be used to exclude transgender people from international legal protections. Some scholars have argued that the definition's phrase "within the context of society" could extend to sexual orientation and gender identity, a reading adopted by the ICC Office of the Prosecutor's 2022 Policy on the Crime of Gender Persecution. Thomas notes that such a reading may exclude non-Western gender categories such as the hijra, fa'afafine, two-spirit people, and Balkan sworn virgins from protection.

In a 2014 article, Brian Kritz assessed the ability of the International Criminal Court to protect and promote transgender rights, arguing that existing law should be explicitly extended to transgender people. He noted that the lack of existing protections for transgender people under international law was in-and-of-itself "a violation of the basic human rights of the global transgender and intersex populations." Scholars have made similar arguments regarding the legal definition of crimes against humanity.

In the past, international courts have interpreted genocidal sexual violence to be a problem of cisgender women alone, often classifying the same systematic sexual violence against all members, who are not cisgender women, as crimes against humanity, as was done by the United Nations International Fact-Finding Mission for Myanmar. David Eichert argues that this interpretation "discounts the suffering of victims and needlessly weakens attempts to identify, prevent, and punish the crime of genocide" and pleads for the field to adopt a broader understanding of genocidal sexual violence, which is not limited to cisgender women alone. While the International Criminal Court has not yet adjudicated on sexual violence in genocide, in Prosecutor v Ntaganda it accepted that cisgender men could be victims of sexual violence. Later the Office of the Prosecutor's 2023 Policy on Gender-Based Crimes connected gender-based violence to genocide, and included "LGBTQI+ people" in its understanding of "gender-based violence".

=== Genocide studies ===
Genocide studies research that focuses exclusively on transgender people is rare, with Lily Nellans noting that "the unique and specific experiences of queer people during genocide remain absent from this type of research, limiting our understanding of genocidal processes". Henry Theriault, former president of the International Association of Genocide Scholars, has argued that discrimination against transgender people is "largely tolerated" despite the fact that identical laws targeting other marginalized people would spark severe public outcry.

Alexander Laban Hinton, an anthropologist focused on genocide, has criticized what he characterizes as "the prioritization of certain protected groups and not others" in established legal definitions of genocide, specifically noting transgender people as a group that could never be targeted by genocide in the status quo. Haley Marie Brown describes violence against transgender women as a "life force atrocity" that is justified using genocidal logic, describing how such violence is often coupled with attempts to eliminate any evidence of a person's transness through complete destruction of their bodies.

Leah Owen, a lecturer at Swansea University, has argued that anti-transgender ideologies rely on "discourses of 'toxification'", drawing on a paper by Rhiannon Neilsen that proposed "toxification" as a more precise alternative to the traditional fourth stage of genocide, dehumanization. Owen compares Nielsen's concept of toxification, in which groups of people are compared to pathogens or threats and their removal from society is necessitated, to statements from Popes Benedict XVI and Francis, Janice Raymond, Abigail Shrier, and Helen Joyce, arguing that regardless of agreement on other issues, anti-transgender activists consistently seek to reduce or eliminate transgender people's public presence. Nevertheless, in 2022 she refrained from claiming that the modern anti-gender movement is currently inciting genocide, arguing that it lacks a securitizing urge to mobilize against transgender people.

Jaimie Veale, a senior lecturer at the University of Waikato, has argued that the "scale, systematicity, and state-directed organization of violence" that characterize genocide are not features of anti-transgender politics in the 21st century, but that such are not necessary for contemporary "trans eliminationism" as the "social, legal, and institutional" mechanisms that are being employed are producing the desired results, and that a possible escalation to more violent forms of eliminationism is not inevitable.

The Lemkin Institute for Genocide Prevention has described gender critical feminism as "genocidal ideology that seeks the complete eradication of trans identity from around the world". In a statement on the issue, the Lemkin Institute argued that rhetoric from anti-trans activists depicting trans women as dangerous were not based on fact, but instead as essential to manufacturing consent for anti-trans violence.

=== Biomedical and genetic ethics ===
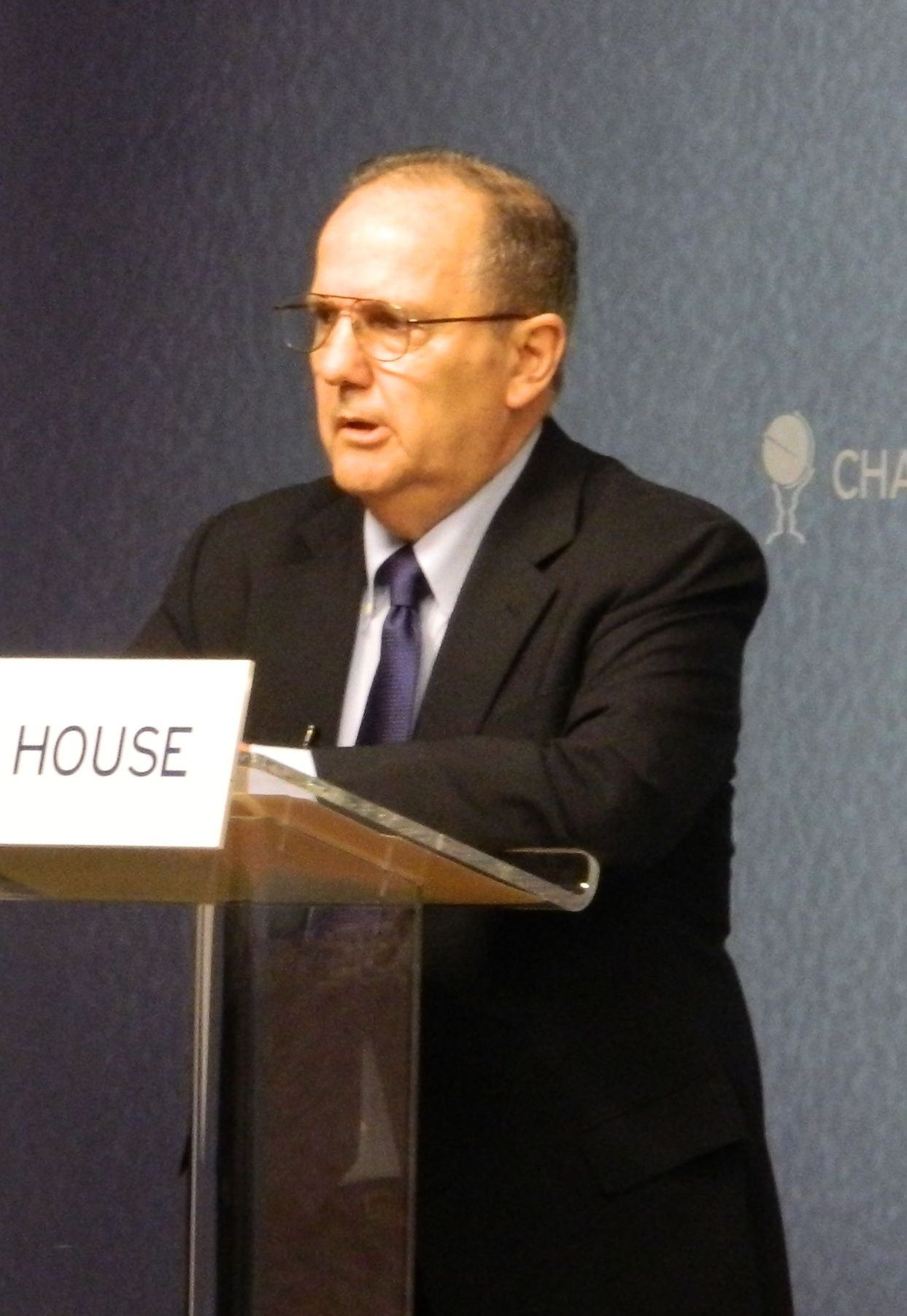
Juan E. Méndez, the UN Special Rapporteur on Torture and Other Cruel, Inhuman or Degrading Treatment or Punishment from 2010–2016

Some surveys have indicated that there is a concern among transgender individuals that trans-associated genetic research may lead to eugenics. A study conducted in 2021 found that many of those surveyed believe that genetic research could end up with a kind of "eugenics" that would, in effect, "eliminate" transgender people, while some respondents feared that, in more transphobic areas, trans-associated research would lead to "medical genocide". This concern has been supported by scholars who highlight the link between the medical care transgender people can access and receive and eugenics movements historically and contemporaneously. In 2022, a study found that almost of half of individuals interviewed feared the "weeding out" of LGBTQ people while a quarter explicitly referred to "cleansing or eugenics". Lawyer Agripino Kennedy links biological essentialist language in recent U.S. laws and bills targeting transgender people to past and current eugenic ideologies, and on the history of eugenic laws targeting the queer community, and transgender people, specifically in the U.S. and Germany.

Sterilization that is forced upon transgender people in order to obtain legal recognition is characterized by various researchers, including political theorist Anna Carastathis, as a violation of reproductive rights, eugenic, and genocidal. On the extent of this practice among European countries, she cites a 2013 report by the UN Special Rapporteur on Torture and Other Cruel, Inhuman or Degrading Treatment or Punishment. Recognizing that transgender persons are not covered by legal definitions of genocide, she argues "that trans people are systematically written out of legal existence" both through the compulsory sterilization and their exclusion from the Genocide Convention. In contradistinction to Carastathis, political scientist Jemima Repo argues that compulsory sterilization does give transgender people a political existence, but at the expense of a capacity to extend kinship (i.e., family) into the future. As a result, Repo says that reproduction, at least in Finland, becomes a mode of transgender resistance in the face of sterilization demands.

=== Other fields ===
Transgender genocide has been examined by scholars of queer studies, hate studies, and other fields. Katerina Standish, a lecturer in peace and conflict studies, building on the idea of gendercide, uses the term transicide for gendercidal violence committed against transgender people for "their nonconformity to the sex-gender binary". She further argues that since femicide is theorized as a form of genocidal violence, transicide should also be understood as a form of genocidal violoence. Caitlin Biddolph, a lecturer in international relations, highlights that queer victims of crimes such as genocide have previously chosen silence in legal proceedings where they were likely to face discrimination and punishment for their queer identities.

== History ==
Throughout history, many transgender persons have experienced systematic persecution, including mass incarceration, forceful detransition or change of gender, and social death. Historians have described as genocidal selected actions against transgender people, including colonialist and Nazi activities that occurred before the term genocide was used in international law. Adam Jones wrote in his 2017 book Genocide: A Comprehensive Introduction that "In recent years, as gay rights have become gradually more accepted and respected, the burden of atrocity has increasingly targeted transgender women and male transvestites."

=== Nazi Germany ===
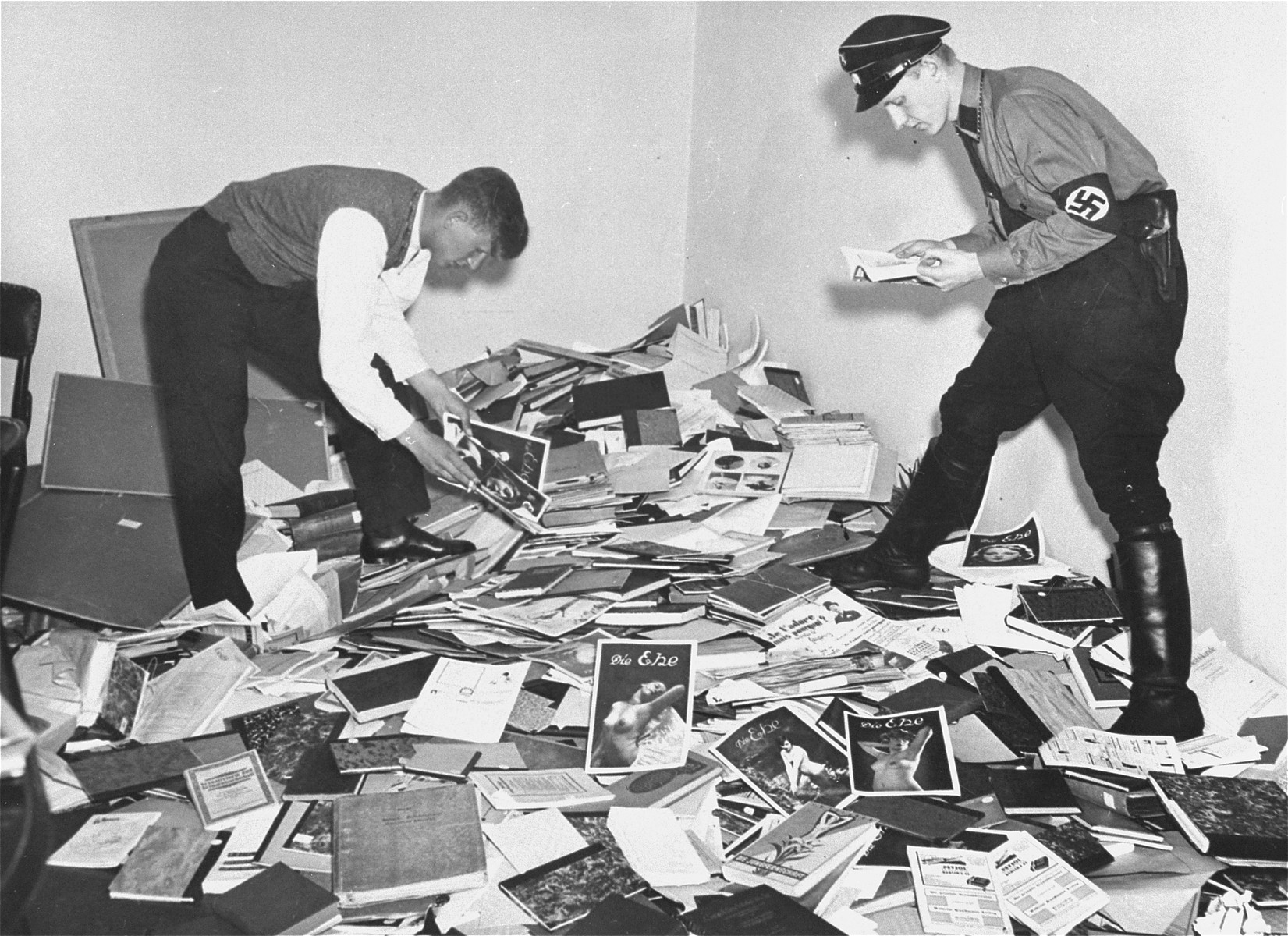
German students and Nazi SA members plunder the library of the Institute for Sexology

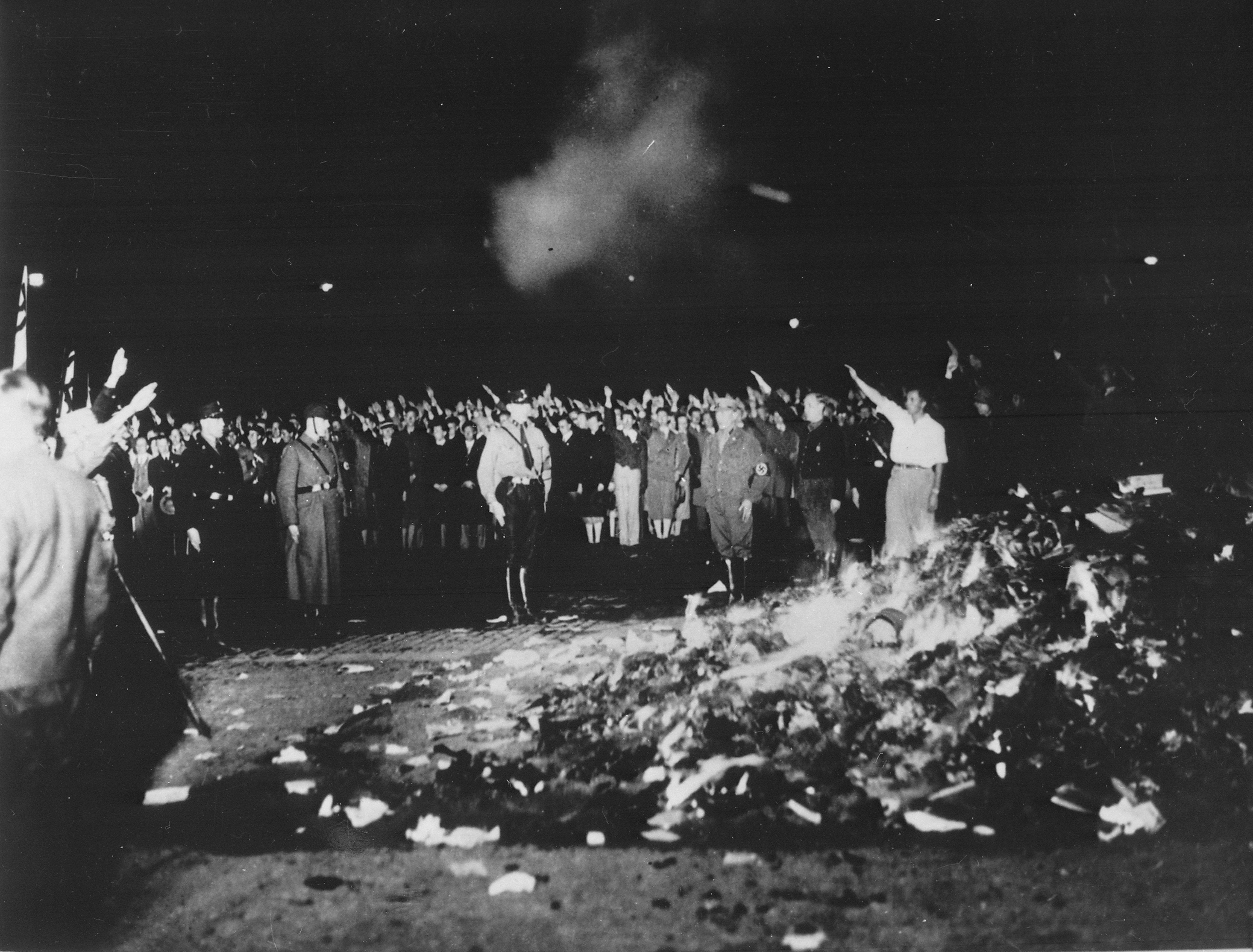
Nazi Party members at the Opernplatz book burning in Berlin

Sociologist Matthew Waites examines the absence of sexuality, gender, sexual orientation or gender identity as group categories in the Genocide Convention. He argues that those targeted by the Nazis because of their non-conforming gender identities should be recognized as a genocide unique from the Holocaust. Thomas similarly cites the Third Reich's extermination of so-called "degenerate" LGBTQ+ identities to argue that the convention's concept of a national group is constructed around the heterosexual citizen, with sexual dissidents treated as "antithetical to the nation". According to the Museum of Jewish Heritage, the Nazi German government "brutally targeted the trans community, deporting many trans people to concentration camps and wiping out vibrant community structures." This area of research is underdeveloped and the number of transgender victims is unknown. Heather Panter, writing in the book Genocide and Victimology, noted that the number of transgender people targeted by the Nazis was likely lower than the number of gay people targeted.

Matt Fuller and Leah Owen argued that while Nazi anti-queer ideology was "incoherent and erratic", they targeted transgender people with extermination and memoricide. They cited the looting and burning of the over 20,000 books at the Institute for Sexology as an example of this memoricide. The Institute for Sexology published journals on trans and queer issues and pioneered early gender-affirming surgeries. The institute also hosted the D'Eon Organization, which was founded in 1930 to advocate trans rights. Fuller and Owen cited research conducted by Heike Bauer into the work of Magnus Hirschfeld at the Institute for Sexology, to explain a psychological element to this, stating "the mere presence of the bodies and desires of trans people was a challenge, threat, and source of anxiety to many Nazis, meaning they – or the physical archive that reflected their identity – had to be destroyed."

The Nazis provided varied justifications for their targeting of queer people and often conflated trans issues with homosexuality. In a document outlining the division of labor in the Reich Central Office for the Combating of Homosexuality and Abortion, "transvestites" were listed as a responsibility of the organization, separately from "all manifestations of homosexuality" and "combating of all enemies of positive population growth", suggesting trans identity was conceived of as a distinct issue and threat by the Nazis. The distinction of "transvestites" was seen contemporaneously with the publication of books such as Ein Beitrag zum Problem des Transvestitismus by Hermann Voss, which espoused the benefits of Nazi persecution of such "transvestites". This persecution included removing rights such as the issuing of "Transvestitenscheine" ("transvestite certificates") that protected such individuals from arrest, that had been achieved under the Weimar government. As part of the 1933 mass incarceration of gay men in Fuhlsbüttel concentration camp, Hamburg city administration told the chief of police to "pay particular attention to transvestites and to deliver them to the concentration camps if necessary." A prominent case was that of Liddy Bacroff, who was executed at Mauthausen concentration camp in 1943.

Fuller and Owen further argued that transmasculine and transfeminine individuals faced inconsistent treatment. Masculine presentations from those assigned female at birth were stigmatized: the National Socialist Women's League published a book in 1934 which warned gender ambiguity represented "signs of degeneration emanating from an alien race ... inimical to reproduction and for this reason damaging to the Volk. Healthy races do not artificially blur sexual differences" and Himmler complained in 1937 about the "nauseat[ing] catastrophe that was masculinizing ['young girls and women'] so that, over time, the difference between the sexes, the polarity, is blurred. From there, the path to homosexuality is not too far off." There is an inconsistency in individual accounts of transmasculine people. One was forcibly detransitioned, another was detained in Lichtenburg concentration and released 10 months later with a permit from the Gestapo to wear men's clothing, and another was allowed to dress as a man without a permit following a medical examination and a promise that they had never engaged in homosexual relations.

In 2022, the Regional Court of Cologne ruled that denying that trans people were targeted by the Nazis qualifies as "a denial of Nazi crimes".

On 27 January 2023, the German government dedicated its annual Holocaust memorial commemoration to LGBTQ victims of the Holocaust. This marked the first time the German government had granted official recognition to transgender people as victims of the Holocaust. In a speech given at the commemoration, German Bundestag President Bärbel Bas stated "For our remembrance culture, it's important that we tell the stories of all victims of persecution, that we make their injustice visible, that we recognize their suffering." Transgender people have also been recognized or commemorated as victims of the Holocaust by the Human Rights Campaign, Amnesty International, the European Parliament, the Museum of Jewish Heritage, and the United Nations.

=== Indigenous peoples of the Americas ===
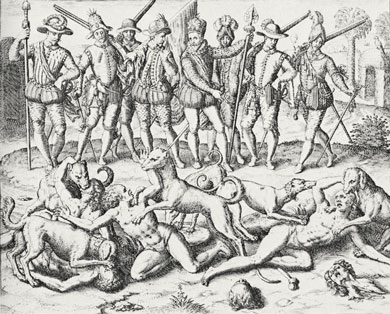
Engraving of Vasco Nuñez de Balboa executing indigenous Panamanians by war dogs for same-sex practices by Theodor de Bry, 1594

The violence perpetrated against Indigenous peoples of the Americas who did not conform to European sexual and gender norms due to this nonconformity has been described as genocide, while others such as Deborah A. Miranda and Gregory D. Smithers view such as an example of gendercide which was a tool in the genocide of indigenous peoples. Thais Torres-Castro and Amalia Morales-Villena highlight this in the colonization of Puerto Rico and the genocide of indigenous people who did not follow the gender binary.

Deborah A. Miranda uses the term gendercide to identify the Spanish colonial practice of systemically targeting joyas (the Spanish term for third gender people) in an attempt to exterminate them. Miranda details two cases, one in 1513 at Santa Clara in present day Panama, where Vasco Núñez de Balboa encountered about forty Indigenous men "dressed as women", and had them eaten alive by his war dogs. Afterwards the Spanish had such third gender people rounded up and systematically killed. The other is the 1775 memoir of Spanish soldier Pedro Fages, who wrote that about two or three joyas could be identified in each Indigenous Californian village and were "held in great esteem" in their communities. Fages sought to initiate a swift reduction of the joyas, writing that "these accursed people will disappear with the growth of the missions. The abominable vice will be eliminated to the extent that the Catholic faith and all the other virtues are firmly implanted there."

Qwo-Li Driskill writes how this violence was waged against people now understood as two-spirit. Indigenous people subjected to the American Indian boarding schools system have reported how they were taught and pressured to abuse two-spirit individuals within the schools. Ongoing violence against Two-spirit and LGBTQ Indigenous peoples of Canada has also been a focus of study and analysis within the genocidal occurrence of Missing and Murdered Indigenous Women.

In broader discussions, the coloniality of gender has been used to understand the erasure and violence against people referred to as occupying a third gender by Western anthropologists in the Americas through European colonialism.

=== Canada ===
In 2000, the Canadian parliament passed the Crimes Against Humanity and War Crimes Act, making genocide a criminal offence within Canada. In section 318 of the Canadian Criminal Code defined genocide as targeting any "identifiable group", with identifiable group defined as "any section of the public distinguished by colour, race, religion, national or ethnic origin, age, sex, sexual orientation, gender identity or expression, or mental or physical disability." This means that LGBTQ persons are also protected from the crime of genocide under Canadian law.

Anti-trans legislation introduced in 2024 in the province of Alberta and passed into law in 2025 via use of the notwithstanding clause has been described as genocidal by the Lemkin Institute for Genocide Prevention.

=== Indonesia ===
In the mid-1960s in South Sulawesi, a branch of Darul Islam led by Abdul Kahar Muzakkar, alongside a militia formed of the Ansor Youth Movement stigmatized, persecuted, and murdered many among the bissu and the calabai, intersex and transgender social groups. The bissu and calabai were seen as objectionable under Islam and, in 1966, Darul Islam conducted "Operasi Tobat" ("Operation Repentance") which targeted nonconforming Indonesian genders. Bissu rituals were violently suppressed, bissu heads were shorn, and bissu were ordered to conform to male gender roles or die. To demonstrate this coercive threat, Sanro Makgangke, a bissu leader in Bone, was decapitated and their head was displayed as a warning to others.

=== Latin America ===
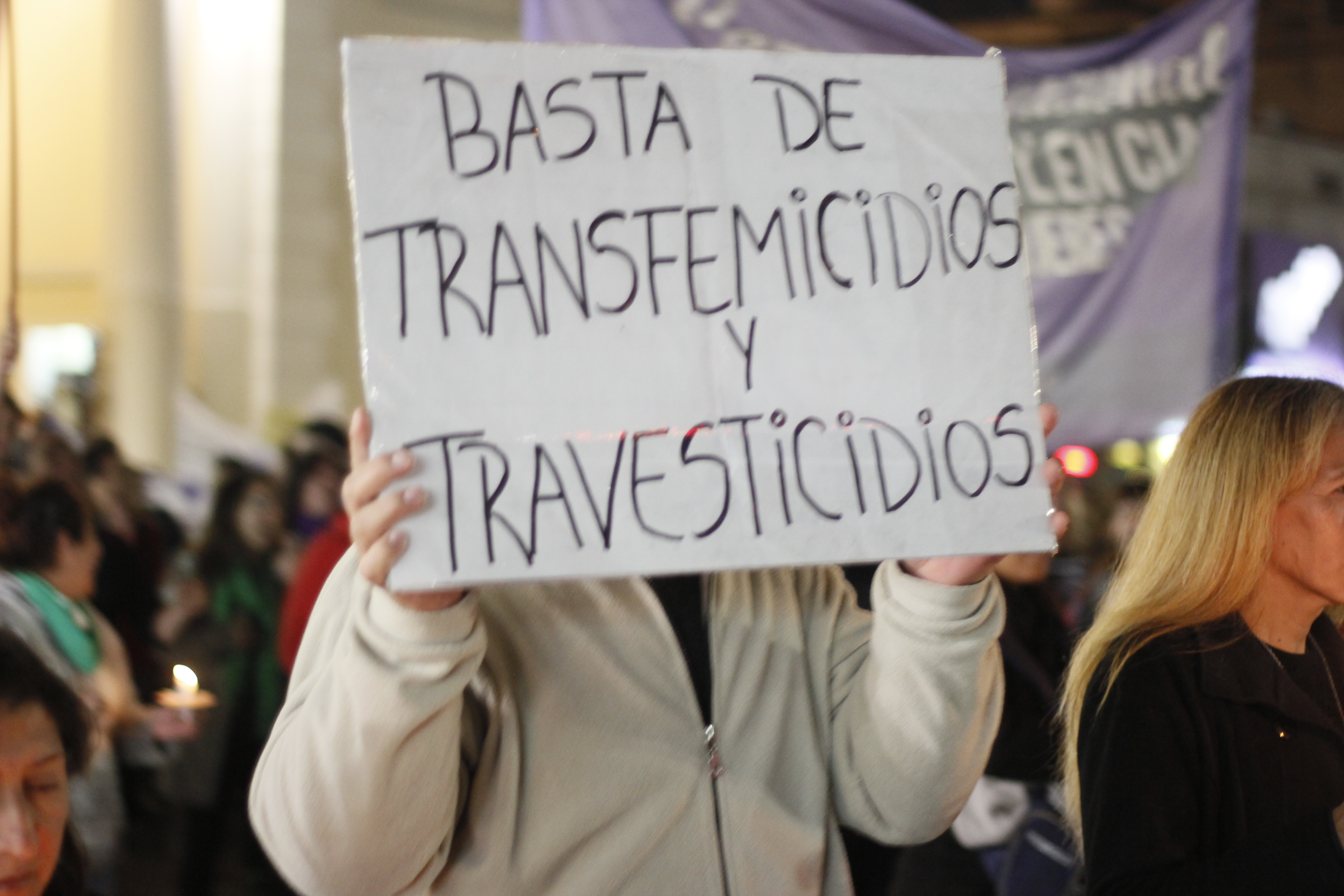
Sign against transfemicide and travesti-cide at a march in protest of the death of Cynthia Moreira, June 2018

Adam Jones describes Brazil's treatment of transgender people as "unquestionably gendercidal", noting that at least one trans person was reported killed every 27 hours in 2014. Professor of psychology Jaqueline Gomes de Jesus has argued that structural and interpersonal violence directed at transgender people in Brazil would satisfy the criteria in articles 2(a) to 2(d) of the Genocide Convention. This is supported by legal scholar Leandro Reinaldo da Cunha.

De Jesus also highlights the prominence of violence against transgender people in Latin America, where of the 816 murders of transgender people recorded from 2008 to 2011, 79% of them occurred in Latin America. Brazil has had the highest amount of transgender murder victims in the world since 2008, with 31% of recorded killings of transgender people occurring in Brazil in 2022–2023. This has led to the average lifespan of a transgender Brazilian being less than half that of a cisgender Brazilian. As 71% of transgender people murdered in Brazil are black, Associação Nacional de Travestis e Transexuais and Rede Trans Brasil suggest that this constitutes a racialised genocide. The neologism transgenerocídio (meaning transgendercide) has been adopted as a term used in Brazil to classify transgender genocide.

In Argentina, while progressive gender identity legislation was passed in 2012, the average life expectancy of transgender people remained at 35 years. In 2018, the first conviction was handed down for the murder of human rights activist Diana Sacayán, where the crime was labelled as "travesticidio", though this decision was overturned on appeal in 2020 due to lack of evidence. In 2021, Argentina amended its penal code to officially include the crimes of "travesticidios, transhomicidios", and "transfemicidios". The first successful "trans homicide" prosecution was in 2024, when Luis Ramos was found guilty of murdering a trans man named Tehuel de la Torre due to hatred for his gender identity.

=== Russia ===
On July 24, 2023, President Putin signed into law a bill banning gender-affirming care in Russia. Russian outlet Meduza described the new law as "genocide" and stating that "it will make [society] even more afraid and hateful of trans people." Former municipal politician Vitaliy Bovar said in response to the passing of the law, and increasing anti-gay laws in previous years that "homophobic and transphobic laws are genocidal practices, an attempt to destroy human diversity in Russia." Yulia Alyoshina, Russia's first openly transgender politician, called the law "a real genocide of transgender people."

=== United Kingdom ===
The rhetoric in UK discourse around transgender people and transgender rights has been likened to the "genocidal language" employed by U.S. commentators such as Michael Knowles, while the biological essentialism in transphobia has been likened to "eugenicist racism". Violence against transgender people has also increased in recent years with increased visibility and increased anti-transgender rhetoric in line with global trends, with hate crimes against transgender people peaking in 2023. Jay Todd from interviews describes dissociation experienced by UK transgender adults as a mechanism some use to endure "the current wave of authoritarian transphobia", with one participant describing "constantly feeling at odds with the world".

Following the For Women Scotland Ltd v The Scottish Ministers Supreme Court ruling and subsequent interim guidance published by the Equality and Human Rights Commission (EHRC), 533 geographers signed an open letter calling on the Royal Geographical Society to act on trans rights, and on June 30, 2025, the Lemkin Institute for Genocide Prevention issued a "Red Flag Alert" for transgender and intersex rights in the United Kingdom. The Institute stated that the ruling by the Supreme Court and the guidance by the EHRC means that "All of the actions described above fit neatly into the 9th Pattern of Genocide", with them subsequently calling the Code of Practice as issued in 2026 genocidal. Other commentators, such as Debbie Hayton, have criticised such assessments, stating that "genocidal mobs trying to eradicate trans people from the UK are hardly likely".

=== United States ===
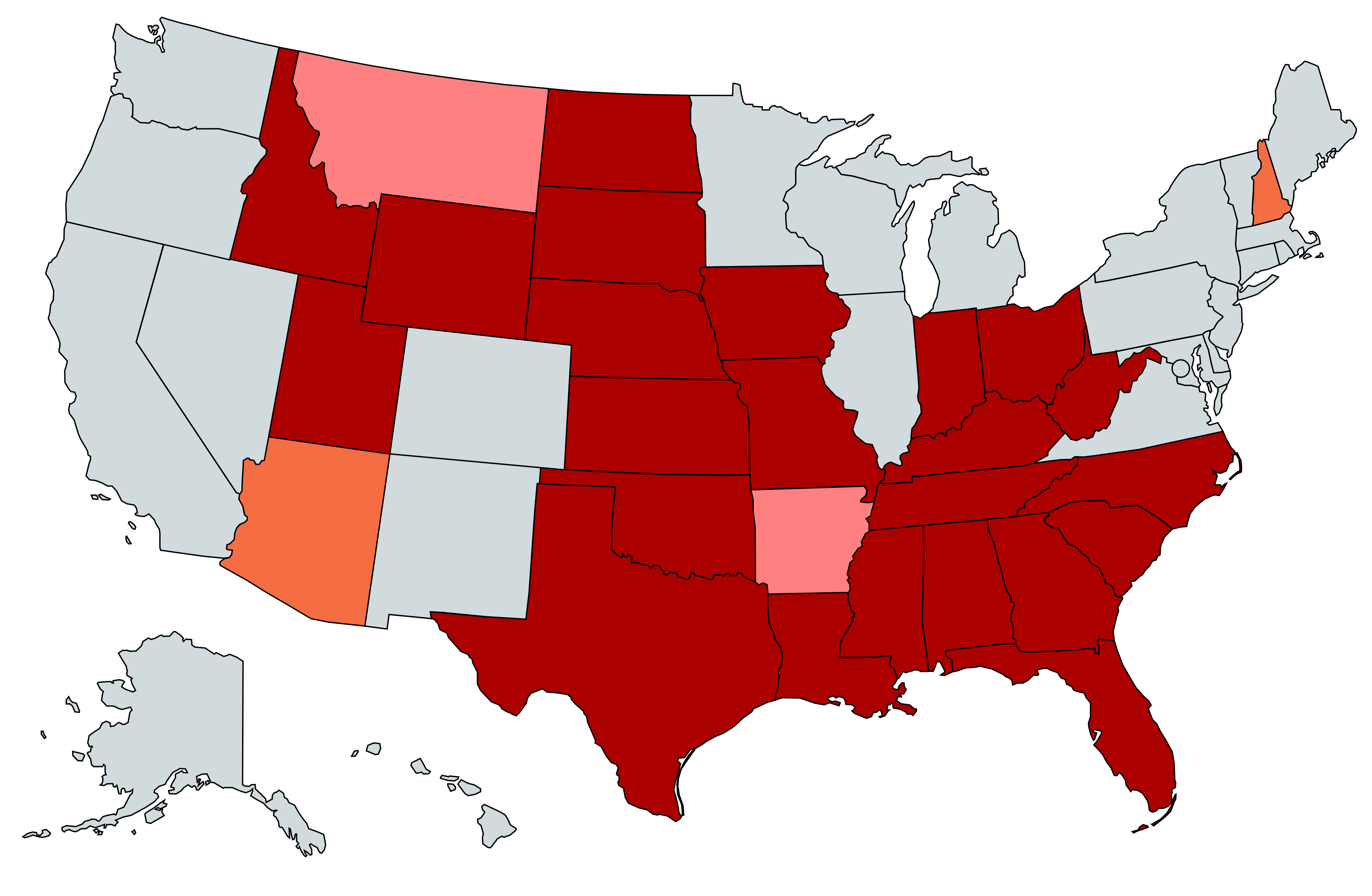
U.S. state laws that ban gender-affirming care for transgender people as of June 2025: Law that restricts gender-affirming care for transgender minors Law that restricts only gender-affirming surgery for transgender minors Law restricting access to gender-affirming care that is unenforceable due to court injunction

Sue E. Spivey and Christine Robinson have argued that the ex-gay movement, which encourages transgender as well as other LGBTQ people to renounce their identities, advocates social death and therefore could meet some legal definitions of genocide. Spivey and Robinson argued that "by waging a culture war using hate propaganda and misusing scientific research to gain public legitimacy, the movement seeks to deploy state powers and the medical profession to perpetrate genocidal acts on its behalf."

Transgender journalist Emily St. James has described some U.S. laws as meeting criteria mentioned in the United Nations definition of genocide, including laws banning gender-affirming care ("causing serious bodily or mental harm to members of the group; deliberately inflicting on the group conditions of life calculated to bring about its physical destruction in whole or in part"), and those allowing child protective services to pursue child abuse claims against the parents of children receiving gender-affirming care and remove said children ("forcibly transferring children of the group to another group"). From 2020 to 2024, over 250 bills were introduced in state legislatures that sought to either limit or ban gender-affirming care for transgender people, with 26 states passing bills by 2025, and bills being introduced at the federal level from 2023 seeking the same goals. Further bills have been introduced restricting transgender people's ability to exist openly in society, with 15 states banning transgender people from sex-segregated spaces. These laws have led to transgender people becoming "internally displaced" as they flee "genocidal politics" in states like Florida, Missouri, and Texas.

Transgender healthcare bans in the U.S. have been condemned by medical organizations. A report published by Yale School of Medicine in response to bans on gender-affirming care in Alabama and Texas argued that the bans were no more ethical than a prohibition on healthcare for any other life-threatening medical condition. The president of World Professional Association of Transgender Health wrote an opinion article in the New York Times stating her view that these laws constituted an effort to "rid the world of transgender people." Similar sentiments were expressed in a WPATH public communique: "Anti-transgender health care legislation is not about protections for children but about eliminating transgender persons on a micro and macro scale." L. June Bloch argues that such bills and laws that "will lead to a statistically predictable increase in suicidality among" transgender people meet the criteria of "inflicting conditions calculated to bring about the destruction of a group" in the Genocide Convention, with district judge Robert L. Hinkle agreeing with expert testimony that these bans cause "needless suffering" and will lead to increase in the "risk of suicide". In a survey of U.S. social work educators, Jama Shelton, S. J. Dodd, and Jamie Borgan found that 95 percent of respondents believed the profession's organisations had an ethical duty to respond to anti-trans legislation, with some respondents describing it as "genocidal and fascist attacks" and one comparing inaction to watching the Nazis burn Hirschfeld's institute.

Leah Owen highlights how far-right groups in the U.S. have been incorporating anti-transgender rhetoric and ideas, and the attempts at the time of writing that sought to eradicate transgender people through "broader cultural/legal/social action" rather than direct extermination. Geneticist Emerson Dusic et al. writing in 2024 highlight how discussions that have occurred in legislatures around bills seeking to limit the rights of transgender people employ medical science and rhetoric that are reminiscent of those used by eugenicists in the 20th century.

In a 2015 interview with CBC Radio, Terryn Witten, an expert on violence against transgender people, said that if just looking at the United States, she would not use the term genocide and instead refer to it as "rampant murder". Witten does argue that when taking a global perspective, there is a transgender genocide ongoing. In the same interview, hate crime expert Bernie Farber of the Canadian Jewish Congress contested the use of the term "transgender genocide" to describe the situation internationally or in the U.S. or Canada due to the state offering protections to trans people in contrast with the state taking a policy of elimination. He described it as being insensitive to victims of recognized genocides, such as the Holocaust, because it does not meet the legal test, despite the "terrible crimes against the community." He argued that it could be applicable on a national level in certain locations, such as in Russia or Uganda. In contrast, the genocide scholar Haley Marie Brown, has argued that murders of transgender women in the U.S., including those of Gwen Araujo in 2002 and Ally Steinfeld in 2017, display the same genocidal logic.

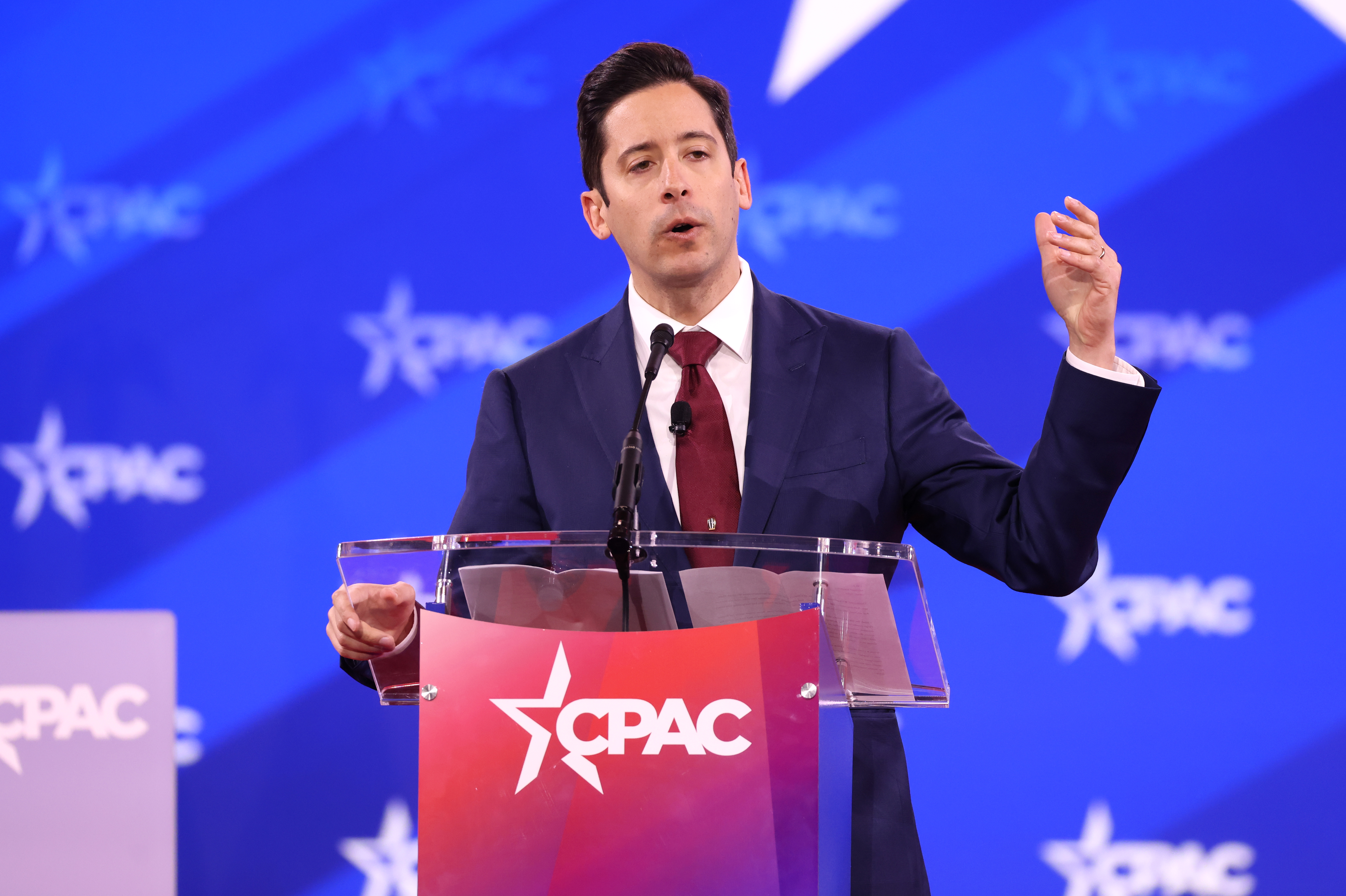
Michael Knowles at CPAC 2025. Knowles' previous comments at CPAC 2023 received widespread condemnation for the use of eliminationist rhetoric.

Statements made by American right-wing media figures regarding trans people have been criticized as genocidal. During a speech at the 2023 Conservative Political Action Conference, political commentator Michael Knowles stated, "There can be no middle way in dealing with transgenderism. It is all or nothing [...] For the good of society, and especially for the good of the poor people who have fallen victim to this confusion, transgenderism must be eradicated from public life entirely". The previous week, Knowles had claimed on his online show presented by the Daily Wire that a genocide against trans people is impossible because they are "not a legitimate category of being." His statements were described as "blatantly genocidal" and that they could exacerbate "genocidal fervor", and were criticized by multiple organizations including the Human Rights Campaign, the Anti-Defamation League, and the American Constitution Society. The Lemkin Institute in its response noted, "The speed of Knowles' response suggests that he may be concerned that his words put him in violation of laws against incitement and may make him accountable for future hate crimes and mass atrocities against trans people." Matt Walsh, another Daily Wire commentator and a key figure of the anti-gender movement in the United States, garnered similar criticism in December 2024 after stating "We are not gonna rest until every child is protected, until trans ideology is entirely erased from the earth" at a protest against gender-affirming care for transgender youth.

Since the start of the second Donald Trump presidency, a variety of executive orders and legislation have been implemented targeting transgender people, with such orders and legislation being described as "arguably genocidal". In February 2025, the Lemkin Institute issued a "Red Flag Alert for Genocide" of transgender individuals, highlighting a series of executive orders issued by the Trump Administration, arguing that these were the first steps toward "removing a trans presence from collective life and preventing trans people from existing as themselves". In April 2025, after Planned Parenthood of Arizona announced they would no longer provide gender-affirming care, transgender journalist David Forbes wrote, "in short, ending trans healthcare on a large scale is a recipe for mass death, and the clear intention is to push society towards our genocide. That is the point of it."

The Lemkin Institute issued a second "Red Flag Alert" in June 2025 in response to the United States v. Skrmetti U.S. Supreme Court decision, which allowed Tennessee to ban gender affirming healthcare for transgender youth, stating that the "decision marks a radicalization of attempts to erase trans people, in whole, as a group, as it prevents trans children and their families from accessing the necessary and appropriate healthcare to support and confirm their gender identity." In September 2025, after the Annunciation Catholic Church shooting, the U.S. Department of Justice held internal meetings to discuss possible methods of placing restrictions on transgender people owning firearms by declaring them "mentally ill" and therefore unfit to own a firearm. In 2026, the Bureau of Alcohol, Tobacco, Firearms and Explosives proposed new rules that would require anyone purchasing a new gun to provide their "biological sex at birth" rather than their gender identity. The proposed rules have been described as a "backdoor ban" on transgender people purchasing firearms. Transgender journalist Finley Smith, commenting on the proposed rules, noted that "Disarming minority groups is one of the early stages of genocidal behavior." Smith acknowledged that, if implemented, the rule change may not immediately affect transgender people who currently own firearms, but argued that the change would still represent "a serious threat" to transgender people, in part because it could result in transgender people whose current legal gender marker does not match their original birth certificate being charged with a felony for "providing seemingly contradictory information that the federal government could read as a lie".

In January 2026, journalist Walker Bragman interviewed three genocide scholars who were concerned that the US was at the "early stages of committing genocide" against transgender people. Former presidents of the International Association of Genocide Scholars Henry Theriault and Gregory Stanton explained that the Trump administration wanted "to destroy a gender group," accuse them of corrupting traditional and family values, marginalize them socially and economically partly in order to urge them to kill themselves, and give tacit permission to law enforcers to use force specifically against them. Stanton and Brown, experts on genocide, deemed these tactics to be "directly borrowed from the Nazis." Their comments were supported by Holocaust educator Lori Shepherd in an interview discussing the targeting of transgender people in the U.S. The third "Red Flag Alert" issued by the Lemkin Institute in March 2026, cited record-breaking increases in anti-transgender legislation and stated that "the United States is squarely within the early to middle stages of a genocidal process against trans people, the goal of which is to completely erase transgender people not only from public life but also from existence in the U.S. and globally." The Lemkin Institute also highlighted the misinformation about transgender violence attempting to paint all transgender people as a threat to the US, pointing to a variety of high profile media individuals and senior officials of government departments such as Jim O'Neil of the Department of Health and Human Services. Writing for the Humanist, Michael McGrady Jr. argued that the Trump administration is engaging in "memoricide", which he defines as a form of genocide and trans erasure, through executive orders and removal of transgender-related information from government websites.

== Activism ==
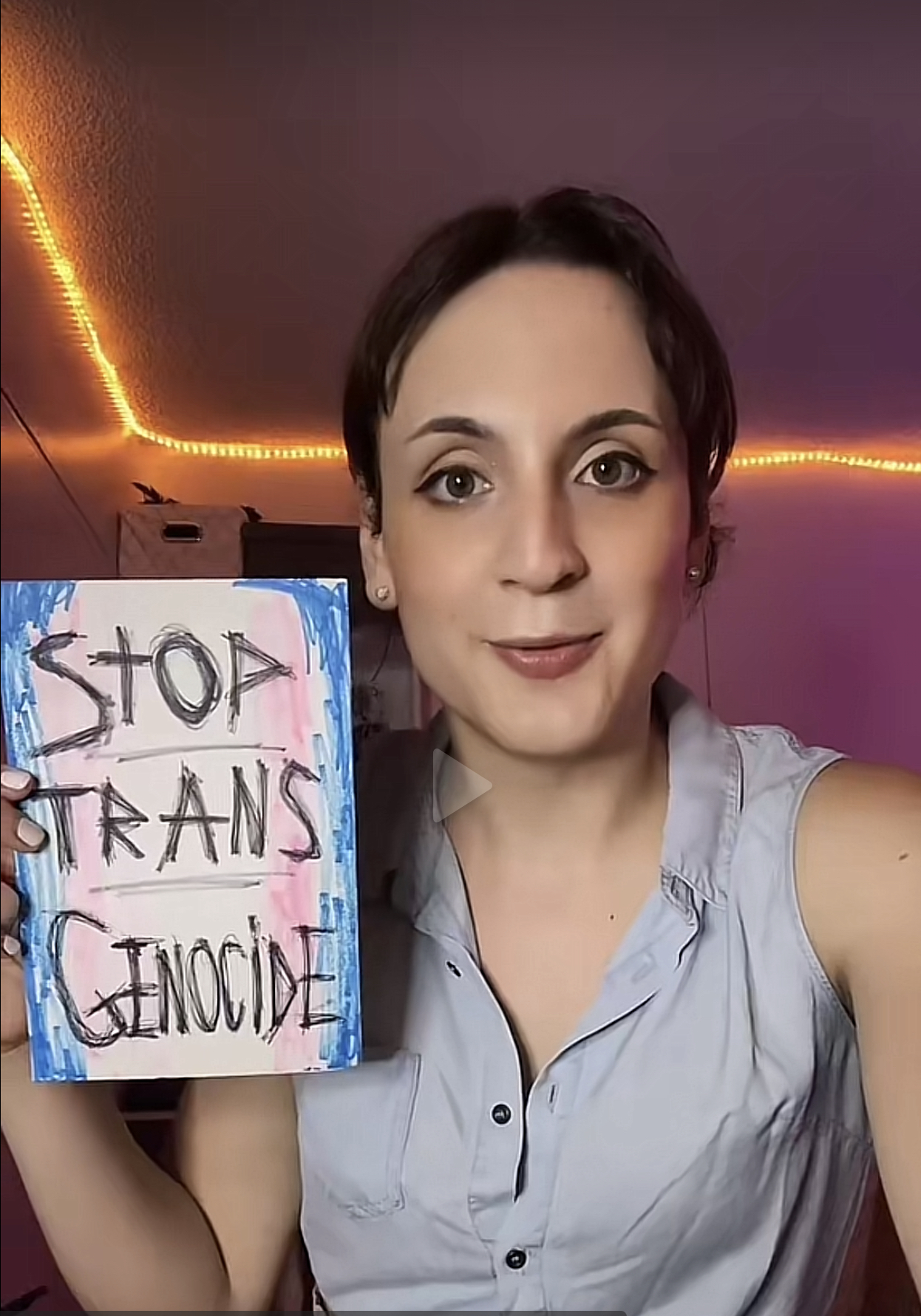
Activist holding a "Stop Trans Genocide" sign

Transgender and other queer activists have used the terms "transgender genocide" and "transgendercide" to oppose discrimination and violence against transgender people, especially when seen as a global phenomenon. In 2013, it was reported that "a coalition of NGOs from South America and Europe started the 'Stop Trans Genocide' campaign." For example, the term was used by a Latin American transgender activist who sought asylum in Germany. In 2018, Planned Parenthood of New York City president Laura McQuade said in a speech that a Trump administration proposal to change federal recognition of transgender persons would lead to genocide. In March 2026, Margaret Cho gave a Queerty Award acceptance speech calling for more vocal support for transgender rights and referring to Kansas Senate Bill 244, which resulted in the immediate revocation of transgender citizens' identification cards in the state, as evidence of "genocide".

At the 2015 March of Pride in Buenos Aires, activists held signs saying "Basta de travesticidios" ("Enough transgendercide"). (Note: The translation is more literally "Enough Travesti-cide", but English language sources translate it as "Enough transgendercide") In Brazil, activists have also described the targeting of transgender people, particularly Afro-Brazilian transgender women, as a genocide.

== See also ==
- AIDS–Holocaust metaphor
- Black genocide
- Gender and violence
- List of people killed for being transgender
