= Tribal disenrollment =

Termination of Native American tribal membership

In the United States, tribal disenrollment is a process by which a Native American individual loses citizenship or the right to belong within a Native American tribe.

Banishment and ostracization have historically been a means to punish wrongdoers and maintain social cohesion in Native American tribes. Many tribes continue to reserve the right to banish individuals, despite legal challenges.

Some Native scholars have argued that although belonging in Native nations was historically a matter of kinship, it has become increasingly legalistic. Research found that nearly 80 tribes across 20 states have engaged in disenrollment as of 2016. Some tribal leaders have stated that disenrollments are meant to correct tribal rolls and protect the integrity of the tribe, and others state that disenrollments are politically and economically motivated.

Article 9 of the UN Declaration on the Rights of Indigenous Peoples states: "Indigenous peoples and individuals have the right to belong to an indigenous community or nation, in accordance with the traditions and customs of the community or nation concerned." No discrimination of any kind may arise from the exercise of such a right. Article 33 of that UN states that "Indigenous peoples have the right to determine their own identity or membership in accordance with their customs and traditions." Individual and tribal rights clash in the disenrollment context.

In the United States, it is entirely up to the tribes to determine the criteria and procedures that an individual must meet and undergo to be considered for tribal citizenship. Tribal constitutions outline criteria for citizenship which can include minimum blood quantum requirements, residency, lineal descendant, or other criteria. Many tribes who formed governments under the Indian Reorganization Act of 1934 have minimum blood quantum requirements. Some tribes require genetic paternity tests to prove an applicant's claimed father is a tribal citizen.

In 2016 a website called "Stop Disenrollment" was set up by Native Peoples.

In 2017 it was reported that an estimated 9,000 members of 72 native tribes have been disenrolled

In 2020 it was estimated that nearly 10,000 citizens of 85 (out of 574 federally acknowledged tribes) have been disenrolled over 15 years.

== See also ==
- Loss of citizenship
- Cherokee Freedmen
- Impact of Native American gaming
- Native American recognition in the United States
- Native American reservation politics
- Native American self-determination
- Native American tribal rolls
- Nooksack people disenrollment controversy.
- Pechanga Band of Luiseño Indians membership and disenrollment
- Tribal sovereignty
- Redding Rancheria
- Paper genocide
- Denaturalization
- Identity cleansing
- Voter caging
