= Mirko Grmek =

Croatian-French medical historian (1924–2000)

- Born: 9 January 1924; Krapina, Zagorje, Kingdom of Serbs, Croats and Slovenes, now Croatia
- Died: 6 March 2000 (aged 76)
- Citizenship: Croatian, French
- Education: University of Zagreb, Politecnico
- Known for: Histoire du sida (History of AIDS)
- Awards: Légion d'honneur
- Scientific career
- Fields: History of medicine
- Workplaces: Collège de France, CNRS
- Thesis: Medical schools in Dalmatia during the French rule (1958)

Mirko Dražen Grmek (9 January 1924 – 6 March 2000) was a Croatian and French historian of medicine, writer and scientist. He was one of the pioneers and founders of the history of medicine. His entire opus promotes the historical research of medical knowledge and practices by means of contemporary scientific methods, especially the study of the formation of ideas in specific societies and periods. He put forward the theory of pathocenosis, the coexistence of all diseases in a specific time, place and society.

== Life and career ==
Grmek was born in Krapina, Zagorje, near Zagreb (then in the Kingdom of Serbs, Croats and Slovenes). He went to France and joined the French Resistance in 1942. His underground activities took him to Italy, Switzerland and then back to France. When the war ended, he returned to Zagreb to study medicine. After his studies, Grmek worked as a general practitioner at first. Then he became a university professor and finally dedicated all his time to scientific work. He got his Ph.D. from the University of Zagreb 1958, with the thesis "Medical schools in Dalmatia during the French rule". There he founded the Institute for the History of Science and edited the first local Encyclopedia of Medicine.

Graduating from the Italian Politecnico, Grmek settled in Paris in 1963. The Collège de France gave him the task of editing the notes of Claude Bernard, which was a turning point of his career, since he later become an international expert in Bernard's area of research. In 1967, Grmek became a French citizen. After graduating literature in Paris, he did research in CNRS. In 1973, Grmek became the director of the research of the history of biological and medical sciences at the École pratique des hautes études. As a doctor of science and literature, he lectured at the universities of Berkeley, Los Angeles, Geneva, Bologna and Lausanne. The University of Zagreb gave him the title of emeritus.

His editorial work included the positions of the scientific director of the International Encyclopedia of Science and Technology, as well as the editor-in-chief of the International Archive of the History of Science.

Grmek was a member of HAZU and its American counterpart. He was the president of the International Academy for the History of Science from 1981 to 1986 and the vice president of the International Union of the History of Science in 1997. He was awarded the order of Légion d'honneur and the Sarton Medal. Grmek was also a laureate of the French Academy, the Academy of Science, the Academy of Medicine.

In the nineties, Croatia became an independent country. Grmek spent the last years of his life building bridges between his two homelands, such as his book The Villefranche-de-Rouergue uprising, about the uprising of Croatian soldiers in the German army occupying France. During the Siege of Sarajevo he forged the word Memoricide. Before he died, he left a large part of his library to HAZU and set up the foundations for the Croatian Cultural Center in Paris. He was buried in the Montparnasse Cemetery.

The scientific magazine Eurêka published a large interview with Grmek in 1996. It was titled Mirko Grmek, the Physician of the Century It said: "Recognized among the scientists from all over the world, but unknown to the general public, this Croat spent his entire life vigorously defending one idea: that medicine must have a conscience and that science is nothing without humanism."

The French Institute for Contemporary Publishing Archives (IMEC) archives his published work.

== Pathocenosis ==
As a historian, Grmek strongly believed that a historical reconstruction should start from a clear statement of facts and a valuation of the permanent elements of the human organism. By "facts", he meant diseases; by "permanent elements", he meant the elements of human physiology. The history of medicine, however, should be primarily a historical overview of diseases in various societies and the defense strategies used by human organisms against them. Grmek followed the work of Claude Bernard, the founder of experimental medicine and initiator of physiology as an essential medical discipline, who believed that the notion of disease covers all the phenomena that weaken the defenses of the milieu interieur (inner space), i.e. the organism, and that disease largely depends on the environmental factors.

Of course, diseases are not concrete objects like e.g. microorganisms that cause contagion. Since a disease is a reactive process, it cannot be separated from the body where it has appeared. It seems, however, that diseases have an existence that doesn't depend on their carriers. Such independence can be seen when many people get sick: the disease becomes an event. It shows the concrete existence of diseases as phenomena that strike at entire societies.

In fact, Grmek uses the epidemiological approach. His best known work in this area is History of AIDS, a much-translated work about the most famous disease of the 20th century, AIDS. Looking for the causes of the disease, he analyzes in detail the disputes between French and American scientists, up to the point when Montagnier at the Pasteur Institute identified the HIV retrovirus.

But Grmek believes that the epidemiological research can't record the appearance and spread of a specific disease in a specific society if the disease in question isn't linked with all the other diseases, chronic or occasional, which appear in the relevant society. It is the basis of his theory of pathocenosis, the coexistence of all diseases in a specific time, place and society. The pathocenosis theory, which was adopted by Grmek to explain the spread of AIDS, but also to reconstruct the pathological state of the Greek world (Diseases in the Ancient Greek World), includes several hypotheses which can all be verified with methods appropriate for the relevant period (paleopathological data and literary texts for the ancient world; statistics for the contemporary world). Those hypotheses can be summarized in this way:

- a single disease, either infectious or degenerative, can be considered only in relation to all the other diseases in a particular society;
- the existence and spread of a disease depends on the existence and spread of all the other diseases in that society;
- environmental and cultural factors determine the precise pathocenosis, i.e. the tendency of certain diseases to have a stable presence in a society (in the ancient West, for example, those were the syndromes of flu in winter, related to the syndromes of digestive diseases in summer);
- the appearance of a new environmental or cultural factor can usher the dominance of a disease (e.g. cancer in the industrialized countries), where one pathocenosis is replaced by another.

The disease that creates a new pathocenosis largely figures as the main pathology of the age. Historically, typical pathocenoses were the tuberculosis pathocenosis in the 19th century or the typhoid fever pathocenosis in the imperial Russia. In the recent decades, the infamous title of the main pathocenosis has been disputed between AIDS and cancer. Still, Grmek warns that it is very difficult to determine the pathocenosis of today's world, since the constant planetary migration of large masses of people from south to north, as well as the development of communications, have turned Earth into a global village.

Grmek's approach can be described as medical Platonism. He believes that diseases are not bodily phenomena, but ideas. Like Plato's ideas, they can exist only together with others. In the reality of pathology, the idea becomes a concrete disease that depends on the state of the organism. Then it is related to the lifestyle, culture, as well as the way in which the disease is perceived and the tendency of societies to form systems of collective defense against diseases. In fact, Grmek took a "hard" scientific discipline such as epidemiology and turned it into the basis for a new humanism, which doesn't reject science in favor of man, but uses it as an instrument to collect facts and form ideas in order to better understand the economy, politics and culture of the "big history".

== Select bibliography ==
- Uvod u medicinu (An Introduction to Medicine), 1961, 1996
- Léonard de Vinci, dessins scientifiques et techniques (Leonardo da Vinci, Scientific and Technical Drawings), 1962
- Mille ans de chirurgie en Occident (A Thousand Years of Western Surgery, 1966.
- U borbi za narodno zdravlje, 1966
- Catalogue des manuscrits de Claude Bernard (Catalog of the manuscripts of Claude Bernard), 1968
- Raisonnement expérimental et recherches toxicologiques chez Claude Bernard (Experiments and toxicological research of Claude Bernard), 1973
- Les Maladies à l’aube de la civilisation occidentale (Diseases at the Dawn of Western Civilization), 1983
- Histoire du sida (History of AIDS), 1989
- la Première révolution biologique (The First Biological Revolution), 1990
- le Nettoyage ethnique (Ethnic Cleansing), co-author, 1993
- Mistika riječi (Mysticism of Words), a collection of poetry, 2000
- Histoire de la pensée médicale en Occident (History of Medical Thought in the West), 3 volumes, 1995–99
- le Legs de Claude Bernard (The Heritage of Claude Bernard), 1997
- les Révoltés de Villefranche (The Villefranche-de-Rouergue uprising), co-author, 1998
- les Maladies dans l’art antique (Diseases in Ancient Art), co-author, 1998
- La Vie, les maladies et l'histoire (Life, Diseases and History), 2000
- La Guerre comme maladie sociale (War as Social Disease), 2000
- Le chaudron de Medee (Medea's Cauldron), 2004

== Sources ==
- Grmek's obituary in French, written by Zvonimir Frka-Petešić
- A large article about Grmek in Italian
- Škrobonja, Ante (June 2003). "In memoriam Mirko Dražen Grmek (1924. - 2000.)" (PDF). Acta Medico-Historica Adriatica (in Croatian). 1 (1): 97–102.
- Jones, Adam (13 September 2010). Genocide: A Comprehensive Introduction. Routledge. ISBN 978-1-136-93796-5.
