= Replacement migration =

Theory of human migration

In demography, replacement migration is a theory of migration needed for a region to achieve a particular objective (demographic, economic or social). In most cases in which replacement migration has been implemented, it is to prevent a decline in the working population of a country and to keep the total population growing.

Often, these overall declines in the population are influenced by low fertility rates. When fertility is lower than the replacement level of 2.1 children per woman and there is a longer life expectancy, this changes the age structure over time. Overall, the population will start to decline as there will not be enough children born to replace the population of people lost and the proportion of older individuals composing the population will continue to increase. One concern from this is that the age-dependency ratio will be affected, as the working-age population will have more dependents in older age to support. Therefore, replacement migration has been a proposed mechanism to try and combat declining population size, aging populations and help replenish the number of people in the working age groups.

Projections calculating migration replacement are primarily demographics and theoretical exercises and not forecasts or recommendations. However, this demographic information can help prompt governments to facilitate replacement migration by making policy changes.

The concept of replacement migration may vary according to the study and depending on the context in which it applies. It may be a number of annual immigrants, a net migration, an additional number of immigrants compared to a reference scenario, etc.

Replacement with immigrants can have partisan motivations.

== Types of replacement migration ==
Replacement migration may take several forms because several scenarios of projections population can achieve the same aim. However, two forms predominate: minimal replacement migration and constant replacement migration.

=== Minimal replacement migration ===
Replacement migration is a minimum migration without surplus to achieve a chosen objective. This form of replacement migration may result in large fluctuations between periods. Its calculation will depend on the chosen objective. For example, Marois (2008) calculates the gross number of immigrants needed to prevent total population decline in Quebec. The formula is then the following:

$R_{(t)}\ '=\frac{-\Delta P_{(t,t+1)} }{A_{(t)} }$

Where:

- R(t)' = Replacement Migration avoiding the decline of population in year t
- A(t) = retention rate of immigrants year t, defined by (1 - instantaneous departure rate)
- ∆P(t,t+1) = change in the total population in the time interval t, t+1

=== Constant replacement migration ===
The constant replacement migration does not fluctuate and remains the same throughout the projection. For example, it will be calculated with a projection providing a migration of X throughout the temporal horizon.

== Examples ==
Canada's immigration policy is fundamentally designed to support its economy by addressing labour shortages and mitigating the effects of an aging population. Former Prime Minister Brian Mulroney supported the Century Initiative, a group advocating Canada grow its population to 100 million by 2100, seeing it as vital for economic growth, an aging workforce, and global influence, though this goal sparks debate about infrastructure strain and immigration levels.

Prime Minister Anthony Albanese's government has viewed skilled migration as crucial for tackling Australia's ageing population and workforce shortages.

Chancellor Olaf Scholz's government has actively pursued increased skilled immigration to address Germany's labour shortage and mitigate the effects of its aging population. Scholz indicated that Germany would need to accept approximately 288,000 foreign workers annually.

Spanish Prime Minister Pedro Sánchez has advocated for policies promoting immigration as a means to address Spain's demographic decline and aging population. In January 2026, Sánchez approved a decree to regularize approximately 500,000 undocumented immigrants living in Spain.

== Results ==
The raw results of replacement migration are not necessarily comparable depending on the type of replacement migration used by the author. Nevertheless, major demographics conclusions are recurrent:

- The replacement migration reached impossible levels in practice to avoid aging the population, to maintain dependency ratio or influence significantly the age structure of a region.
- For regions with a relatively high fertility rate, replacement migration avoiding a decline in the total population or the working age is not excessively high. However, for regions with very low fertility rate, migration replacement is very high and unrealistic.
- The level of fertility is a much more important than the Immigration on aging and age structure.

=== Criticism ===
Replacement migration as presented by the United Nations Population Division in 2000 is largely perceived as unrealistic as a singular way of fighting population ageing. One reason being that replacement migration tends to only be a temporary fix to aging populations. Instead of using replacement migration to combat declining and aging populations, government policy and social changes could be implemented. Therefore, replacement migration is said to be more useful as an analytical or hypothetical tool.

Increased migration could decrease the old age dependency ratio, which is expected to grow considerably in the next decades. However, the immigration need to effectively counter the greying of many industrialised economies is unrealistically high.

A 2019 paper reasserted the conclusions of the 2000 UN Population Division paper, arguing that while immigration could play a role in moderating the effects of an ageing population, the number of immigrants required to actually halt the ageing of the population (expressed in terms of maintaining the potential support ratio) was too high to be realistic. A 2016 paper on the impact of migration on the projected population trends of the Scandinavian countries reached similar conclusions.

Replacement migration is also feared to negatively impact the environment. Declining and aging populations are typically seen in more developed countries, as more developed countries have better health care infrastructure and access to education that both decreases mortality rates and subsequently fertility rates in the population. Immigrants are typically moving from areas that have fewer resources or economic opportunities, as access to more resources and economic prosperity can be a pull factors for these migrants to move to a new country. A large influx of immigrants from an area that is low or lacks resources to a country that has more resources may change the availability of resources since there will be more people. Resources could be food, water, land, energy etc.

There are concerns about a brain drain from developing countries, with professionals such as doctors and nurses leaving for better-paid jobs abroad.

Certain countries may be opposed to international immigration. Reasons such as xenophobia can subject new immigrants to discrimination, thus, the immigrants may have trouble assimilating to their new country.

== See also ==
- Cultural sustainability
- Demographic engineering
- Human overpopulation
- Umvolkung
