= Identity cleansing =

Confiscation of personal documents to prevent refugees from returning

Identity cleansing is defined as "confiscation of personal identification, passports, and other such documents in order to make it difficult or impossible for those driven out to return".

== Kosovo War ==
During the Kosovo War in the Federal Republic of Yugoslavia (FRY), expelled Kosovo Albanians were systematically stripped of identity and property documents including passports, land titles, vehicle registration plates, identity cards and other documents. In conjunction with the policy of expelling Kosovo Albanians from the province, the Yugoslav Army would confiscate all documents that indicated the identity of those being expelled.

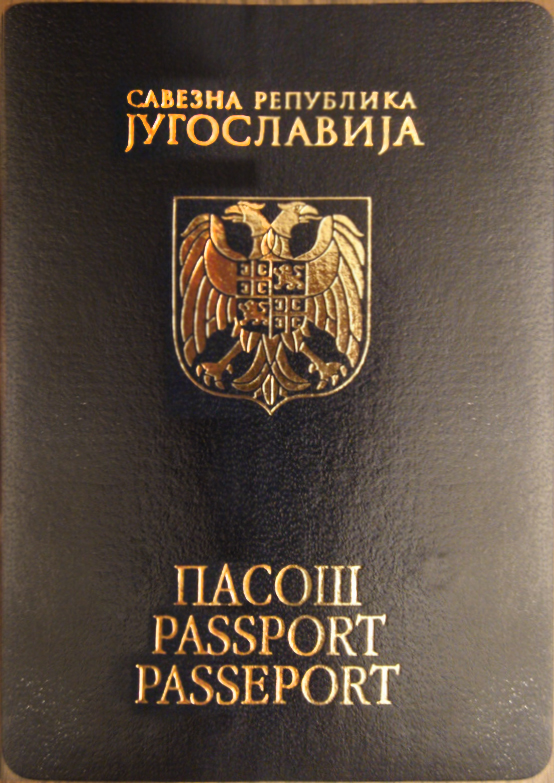
Passport of the Federal Republic of Yugoslavia

Physicians for Human Rights (PHR) reports that nearly 60% of respondents to its survey observed the Yugoslav Army removing or destroying personal identification documents. Human Rights Watch (HRW) also documented the common practice of "identity cleansing"; refugees expelled toward Albania were frequently stripped of their identity documents and forced to remove the registration plates from their vehicles. This criminal practice suggesting the government was trying to block their return.

In addition to confiscating the relevant documents from their holders, efforts were also made to destroy any actual birth certificate as well as other archives which were maintained by governmental agencies, so as to make the "cleansing" complete, which sometimes was being referred to as "archival cleansing".

This practice received worldwide condemnation, and evidence of it has been brought at the war crimes trials held at The Hague after the situation in Kosovo was stabilized following the NATO bombing of the Yugoslavia and the subsequent collapse of its nationalist government in October 2000. Despite difficulties due to "identity cleansing", the United Nations Interim Administration Mission in Kosovo (UNMIK) and Organization for Security and Co-operation in Europe (OSCE) registered 1.3 million voters until the October 2002 municipal elections.

== See also ==
- Denaturalization
- Ethnic cleansing
- List of massacres in Kosovo
- Forced assimilation
- Memoricide
- Paper genocide
- Umvolkung
- White genocide (Armenians)
