= Paper genocide =

Systemic removal of a group of people from historical records

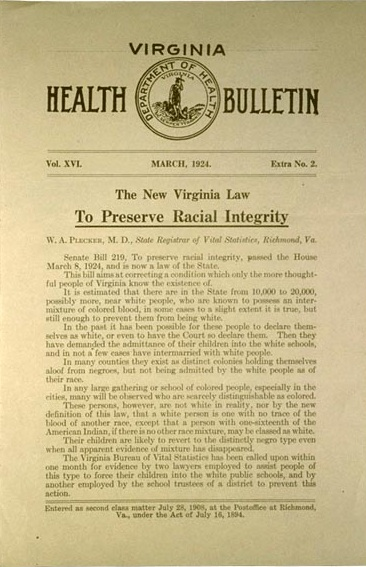
The Racial Integrity Act of 1924, which classified Native Americans in Virginia as "colored", is considered an example of a paper genocide.

Paper genocide is the systemic removal of a group of people from historical records, such as censuses, which gives the impression that that group has disappeared or become extinct. A 2023 article published by Cultural Survival defines the term as "intentional destruction of documents and records related to a particular group of people, usually with the intent of erasing their histories and cultures", while a 2019 article in National Geographic characterizes the term thusly: "Paper genocide means that a people can be made to disappear on paper". The term is often used to refer to government policies regarding Native Americans in the United States and the Indigenous peoples of the Caribbean, primarily the Taíno. According to Cultural Survival, paper genocide can lead to generational and historical trauma for the communities affected.

== Examples ==
=== Taíno and Indigenous peoples of the Caribbean ===
A common example of a paper genocide is that of the Taíno, an Indigenous peoples of the Caribbean. Following the first voyage of Christopher Columbus in 1492, the Taíno population began to significantly decline in the ensuing years, primarily due to virgin soil epidemics and the enslavement and harsh treatment of the Taíno by Spanish colonizers in such labor-intensive fields as gold mining and the cultivation of sugarcane. Estimates for the Taíno population on the island of Hispaniola range from 60,000 to 8 million in 1492, with contemporary writer Bartolomé de las Casas claiming a population of around 3 million. However, by 1542, this number had declined to around 200. According to a 2019 article in National Geographic, shortly after a 1565 census that showed only 200 "Indians" living on Hispaniola, the Taíno were declared extinct. Similarly, on the island of Puerto Rico, where there were an estimated 1 million indigenous people in 1493, a 1787 census recorded only 2,300 non-mixed-race Indigenous people were recorded. In the next census conducted on Puerto Rico in 1802, no Indigenous people were recorded, and according to National Geographic, historical records after this point indicate that no Indigenous people remained in the Caribbean.

Despite the apparent elimination of Indigenous peoples from the Caribbean, several historians note that a paper genocide may have obscured the continued existence of groups such as the Taíno. A 2022 article in the Brown Political Review notes that, in Puerto Rico, Spanish Catholic priests, who were responsible for birth registry, may have been inclined to classify people with some Taíno ancestry as "mestizo" or "mulatto", in part to diminish the representation of Taíno people on the island. A 2019 article in National Geographic also notes possible undercounting of Taíno people due to the classification of people born to Spanish fathers and Taíno mothers. That same article also mentions that, following the abolition of legal slavery of Indigenous peoples of the Americas by the Spanish monarchy in 1533, many slaveholders in the Caribbean may have been inclined to simply reclassify their enslaved people as African rather than grant them their manumission. Additionally, according to the magazine, many censuses in Latin America did not provide an option for Indigenous peoples, instead requiring respondents to identify as either "Hispanic", "white", "black", or mixed-race. In Puerto Rico, this practice continued after the United States gained control of the island.

In the early 1990s, descendants of Indigenous peoples of the Caribbean began a revival of Indigenous cultures and language, including participating in powwows and other festivals, and openly refuted the historical narrative that Indigenous peoples in the region had been eliminated. In the 2010s, genetic research, including the construction of the genome of a Taíno person who had lived between the 8th and 10th century, found that a significant population of the current Caribbean population have traces of DNA from Indigenous peoples. In 2016, 164 Puerto Ricans were tested and all were found to have traces matching the Taíno DNA. That same year, a National Geographic study indicated that 61 percent of Puerto Ricans have Indigenous mitochondrial DNA. Jorge Estevez, a Taíno activist, said of the results, "It shows that the true story is one of assimilation, certainly, but not total extinction".

In 2020, after options for identifying as "Indian or indigenous" were added to the United States census for Puerto Rico, over 92,000 Puerto Ricans identified as such. Additionally, as of the 2020s, several Taíno advocacy groups exist, such as the United Confederation of Taíno People, the Taíno Jatibonícu Tribe of Boriken, and the Taíno Nation of the Antilles.

=== Native Americans in the United States ===
In a 2020 blog for the Law School Survey for Student Engagement at Indiana University, Vickie Sutton, a law professor at Texas Tech University and member of the Lumbee Tribe of North Carolina, described the "policies of first Great Britain and then the United States against the indigenous population in America" as "genocidal", both physically and in paper form. Regarding the latter, Sutton states that both nations "[eliminated] references to Native Americans in property records, census records, birth and death records in a paper genocidal policy".

==== Federal recognition efforts ====
The paper genocide of Native American tribes can have an impact on gaining federal recognition, an important aspect of tribal sovereignty in the United States. For example, in the state of Rhode Island, the Narragansett people spent several centuries attempting to gain federal recognition, which was granted in 1983. Starting in the late 18th century, government officials in the state began to record Narragansett people as "black", "colored", or "negro" on official documents, a practice that was upheld in the 1793 Rhode Island Supreme Court case Aldrich v. Hammer. This was part of an effort by the state to do away with Indigenous identity and force cultural assimilation onto the Narragansett. In a similar case, the Mashpee Wampanoag Tribe of Massachusetts began seeking federal recognition in the 1970s, but their efforts were delayed due to inconsistent data from the United States Census Bureau. It wasn't until 2007 that the tribe became federally recognized.

In 2009, the Supreme Court of the United States ruled in Carcieri v. Salazar that the federal government could only hold land in trust for tribes that were federally recognized in 1934, when the Indian Reorganization Act was passed. Critics have stated that the ruling could have negative consequences on tribes that have gained recognition since then, in some cases because of a lack of adequate historical documentation.

==== Blood quantum laws ====
Blood quantum is a system of measuring Native American ancestry based on the ancestry of an individual's parents, such that, for example, a child who is the offspring of a father with a Native American blood quantum level of one-fourth and a mother whose level is one-half would have a blood quantum level of three-eighths. The system is used by some tribes to determine eligibility for membership, and related concepts have appeared in several treaties between the federal government and tribes, such as in the 1825 Osage Treaty with the Osage Nation. The system was further codified by the federal government in acts such as the 1887 Dawes Act and the 1934 Indian Reorganization Act. Blood quantum levels for Native Americans can be recorded by the Bureau of Indian Affairs, who issue Certificates of Degree of Indian Blood to individuals that are used in tribal recognition.

Regarding the concept, Jill Doerfler, the head of the University of Michigan's American Indian and Indigenous Studies Department, said in 2021, "What blood quantum does is racialize American Indian identity. It is an outside concept used to disenfranchise Native people and tribes from their legal and political status. And it's the best way to eliminate ongoing treaty obligations". In an article for Voice of America's website entitled "Some Native Americans Fear Blood Quantum is Formula for 'Paper Genocide' " Doerfler further elaborated that the system could be used by the federal government to deprive tribes of land and recognition in what she termed a "paper genocide".

==== United States censuses ====
Starting with the first federal census in 1790, Indigenous people were not often recorded. Between 1790 and 1850, Native Americans were largely excluded from the survey, with a major exception occurring in the 1850 census, when Puebloans in the New Mexico Territory were recorded as "Copper". The 1860 census was the first in which Native Americans living alongside white people and free people of color in the general population were recorded. Even then, the conductors of the census were instructed to only record "families of Indians who have renounced tribal rule, and who under state or territory laws exercise the rights of citizens".

With the 1880 census, and continuing over the next several censuses, the Census Bureau introduced a rubric for recording the racial identification of Native American respondents, primarily utilizing the blood quantum system, but also allowing some discretion on the part of the surveyor with regards to other factors, such as how the individual is perceived in their community. The 1890 census was the first to record both Native Americans living among the general population as well as in tribal communities, but due to a fire that destroyed many of the documents, the 1900 census is typically considered the oldest one to give an inclusive count of the country's Native American population. The passage of the Indian Citizenship Act in 1924 affected how Indigenous peoples from Latin America who were living in the Southwestern United States were recorded. As the Census Bureau was concerned that laborers from Mexico would attempt to portray themselves as Native Americans, many Indigenous people from Latin America were recorded only as Hispanic or Latino.

Starting with the 1960 census, the Census Bureau allowed for individuals to self-report their race, leading to many mixed-race individuals who may have previously been recorded by surveyors as another race to report themselves as Native American. Additionally, starting with the 2000 census, respondents could record more than one race, again leading to an increase in mixed-race individuals recording at least one of their races as Native American.

===== Continued undercounting =====
A 2019 article published by Rewire News Group listed "American Indians and Alaska Natives" as the most undercounted group in the United States. According to a report from the Census Bureau, Native Americans living on Indian reservations were undercounted by 12.2 percent in the 1990 census. This figure declined to 4.9 percent in the 2010 census. According to the bureau, approximately 26 percent of Native Americans in the United States live in "hard-to-count" census tracts, and American Indians and Alaska Natives are categorized by the bureau as "hard-to-count populations". According to Judy Shapiro, a Native American civil rights attorney, census data is often used by the federal government for "gatekeeping" federal recognition, saying, "Through the federal recognition process, they determine who is Native, who continues to exist, and who they are responsible for [maintaining trusts and treaties]".

==== Racial Integrity Act of 1924 ====
In 1924, the government of Virginia enacted the Racial Integrity Act. The law both prohibited interracial marriages and codified strict racial distinctions, with all people in the state being recorded as either "white" or "colored". This meant that all Native Americans in Virginia were officially categorized alongside black people as "colored", and instances of "Indian" being used on birth certificates issued prior to 1924 were updated to read "colored" instead. The law was in effect until 1967, when the United States Supreme Court struck it down as unconstitutional in their landmark case of Loving v. Virginia.

According to the National Park Service, the law's "strict definitions of whiteness and blackness led to a mass erasure of Virginia Indian identity. As a result ... Virginia Indians often have difficulty in proving an unbroken lineage, one of the many requirements to becoming a federally recognized Tribe". Chief Stephen Adkins of the Chickahominy Tribe referred to the act as "paper genocide", a sentiment echoed by leaders of other tribes in Virginia, such as the Monacan Indian Nation. In 2018, the United States Congress passed legislation extending federal recognition to six tribes in Virginia whose records had been affected by the law: the Chickahominy, the Eastern Chickahominy, the Monacan Indian Nation, the Nansemond Indian Nation, the Rappahannock Tribe, and the Upper Mattaponi Tribe. In March 2024, on the centennial of the act's passage, leaders from several tribes in Virginia hosted a panel at the Library of Virginia to discuss the act and its continued legacy.

==== Exclusion from statistical studies ====
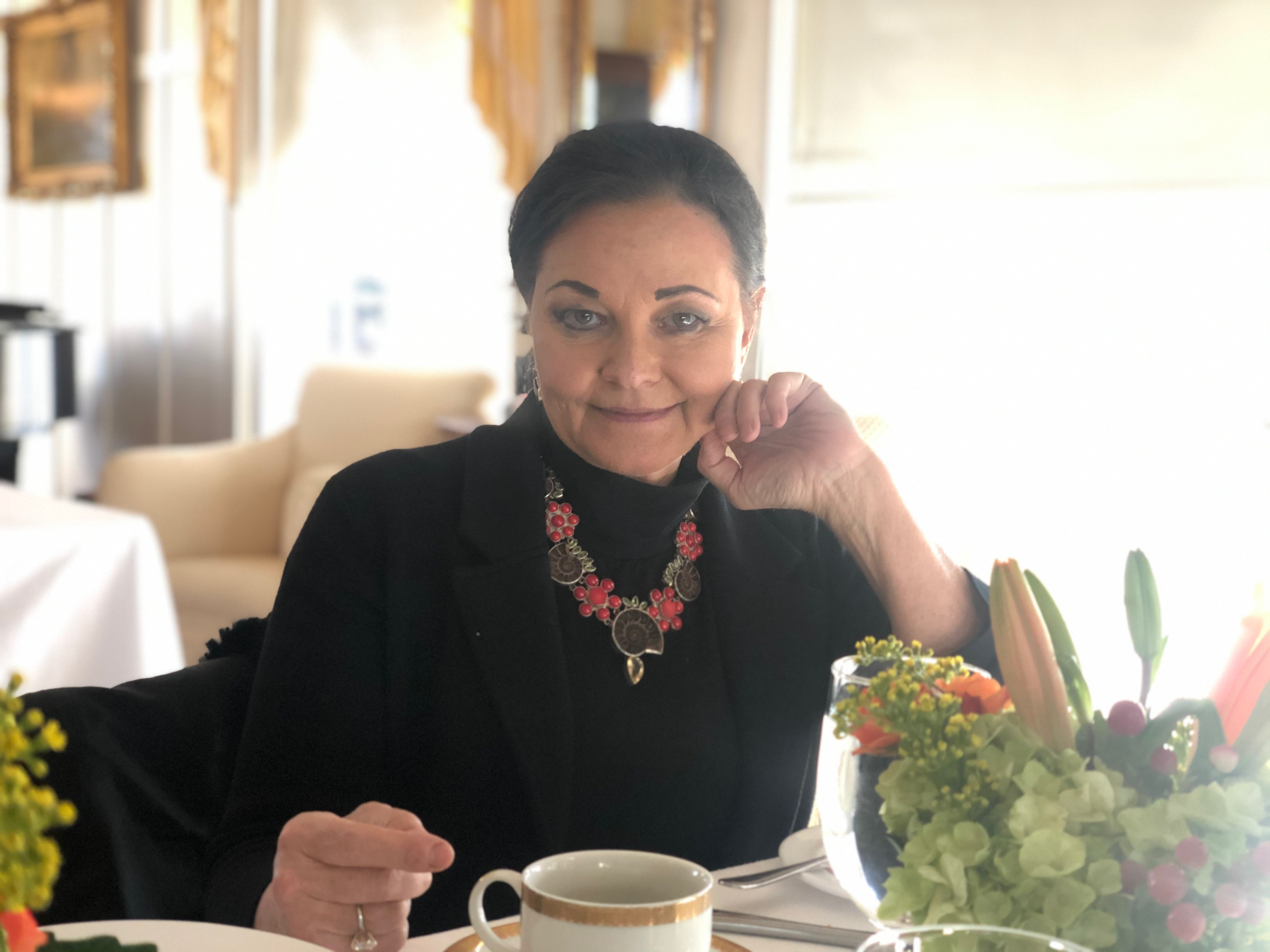
Law professor Vickie Sutton (pictured 2019) has called Native American exclusion from studies a form of paper genocide.

In 2020, Sutton wrote about the exclusion of Native Americans from surveys and statistical studies as a form of paper genocide. As examples of Native American exclusion, Sutton pointed to a 2019 incident in which a spokesperson for the American Institute of Architects announced during a meeting of the American Indian Council of Architects and Engineers that they would no longer collect data on Native American architects due to it being such a small group, as well as a decision by The Princeton Review to cease collection on data regarding Native American university enrollment. Additionally, Sutton highlighted a report issued by the NALP Foundation and the Center for Women in Law at the University of Texas School of Law titled "Women of Color: A Study of Law School Experiences" that did not include Native Americans as a distinct group. While the researchers said in the introduction that the paper "analyzes the experiences reported by women of color by Asian/Pacific Islander, Black/African-American, and Hispanic/Latina students", Native American women were simply included in a catch-all "women of color" category.

Speaking of the responsibility of researchers, Sutton wrote:

To avoid paper genocide, researchers have an obligation to be purposeful in their methods to reach and include Native Americans and share their disaggregated perspectives as part of reported findings. When researchers do not do this, at worst, they continue the practice of paper genocide and at best, it is an unapologetic microaggression.

==== Chukchansi tribe disenrollment and accusations of "paper genocide" ====
In 2024, television station KGPE of Fresno, California, reported that the Picayune Rancheria of Chukchansi Indians, a tribe that owns and operates the Chukchansi Gold Resort & Casino, had disenrolled several members of the tribe after requesting proof of heritage and allotment papers. Several of those who had been disenrolled said that the process was unjust, with Claudia Gonzales, a former member of the tribal council, saying, "If we knew this was coming, then we would have taken precautions and measures to protect the general membership from those few that decided they want to try to create paper genocide".

== See also ==
- Cultural genocide
- Genocide of indigenous peoples
- Native American name controversy
- Racism against Native Americans in the United States
- Social amnesia
- Social invisibility
- Stereotypes of Indigenous peoples of Canada and the United States
- Forced assimilation
- Identity cleansing
- Memoricide
- "Mountain Turks"
- Tribal disenrollment
- Voter caging
- Moriori genocide

== Sources ==
- Dumpson, Taylor A. (2021). "A 385-Year Experiment to Erase a People: Intergenerational Acts of Genocide Against the Narragansett Indian Tribe by the United States of America and the State of Rhode Island" (PDF). Tribal Law Journal. 21 (1). Albuquerque, New Mexico: University of New Mexico School of Law: 89–124. Archived from the original on August 25, 2023.
