= Social invisibility =

Ignorance of a person or group by the public

Social invisibility is the condition in which a group of people is separated or systematically ignored by the majority of a society. As a result, those who are marginalized feel neglected or being invisible in the society. It can include disadvantaged, elderly homes, child orphanages, homeless people or anyone who experiences a sense of being ignored or separated from society as a whole.

== Psychological consequences ==
The subjective experience of being unseen by others in a social environment is social invisibility. A sense of disconnectedness from the surrounding world is often experienced by invisible people. This disconnectedness can lead to absorbed coping and breakdowns, based on the asymmetrical relationship between someone made invisible and others.

Among African-American men, invisibility can often take the form of a psychological process that both deals with the stress of racialized invisibility, and the choices made in becoming visible within a social framework that predetermines these choices. In order to become visible and gain acceptance, an African-American man has to avoid adopting behavior that made him invisible in the first place, which intensifies the stress already brought on through racism.

== Positive meaning ==
Although social invisibility is usually considered a form of marginalization of certain individuals and groups, in recent debates, some scholars have also insisted on the function of invisibility as a strategy for evading identification and categorization. In the wake of authors like Edouard Glissant and his defense of a "right to opacity", it has been argued that "tactical invisibility" can serve as a means of resistance in a world of data surveillance.

== See also ==
- Apartheid
- LGBT erasure
- Necropolitics
- Paper genocide
- Racial color blindness
- Social exclusion
- Social vulnerability
- Invisible Man, a novel exploring the concept
