= Umvolkung =

Concept from Nazi ideology

Umvolkung (German: [ˈʔʊmˌfɔlkʊŋ]) is a term in Nazi ideology used to describe a process of assimilation of members of the German people (the Volk) as a way for them to forget about their language and their origin. As a neologism, it echoes Umpolung, 'polarity inversion', leading to an interpretation akin to "ethnicity inversion".

The term is also used to describe the "re-Germanisation" of the German people, after new Lebensraum was conquered and the German people who already resided there would become more German again. Umvolkung in the first sense was seen as a negative process during the Third Reich, while the second process was seen as more desirable.

== Origin and background ==
The term was invented by Albert Brackmann, a leader of the Ostforschung, a research organization that investigated the character and attitudes (Verhalten) of people living in areas east of the German Reich, such as Poland, Ukraine, Slovakia and Romania.

There was a plan to conquer almost all of Eastern Europe and process the Umvolkung so that all of the formerly German people who had slowly assimilated and mixed with other ethnicities would again become more German.

== Use of the word today ==
In contemporary politics, the term (or translations thereof, e.g. Dutch "omvolking"), is increasingly used by far-right groups and political parties to describe the process of replacement migration e.g. Marjolein Faber, politician member of the PVV. It is suggested by left-wing groups and parties that this term concept denotes a Nazi conspiracy theory (or otherwise, a modern conspiracy known as the Great Replacement), suggesting that right-wing politicians spread the belief that "the elite" is intentionally replacing indigenous people by stimulating immigration and thus the growth of originally foreign populations, in order to ultimately exterminate European peoples, also known as the White genocide conspiracy theory. Within Nazism, the term was not used to suggest that, say, the Jews wanted to destroy the Germanic race through immigration.

== See also ==
- Lebensraum
- Generalplan Ost
- Germanisation
- Volk
- Glossary of Nazi Germany
- Remigration
- White genocide conspiracy theory
