= Memoricide =

Practice of oppression

Memoricide is the destruction of the memory or extermination of the past of a targeted people. It also refers to destruction of the traces (such as religious buildings or schools) that might recall the former presence of those considered undesirable.

Memoricide is used in support of ethnic cleansing or genocide, and is related to cultural genocide. Since memoricide refers to intentional attempts to erase human memory about something, it usually takes the form of destruction of physical property. The term was coined by Croatian doctor Mirko Grmek in a text published in Le Figaro on 19 December 1991.

== Allegations of memoricide ==
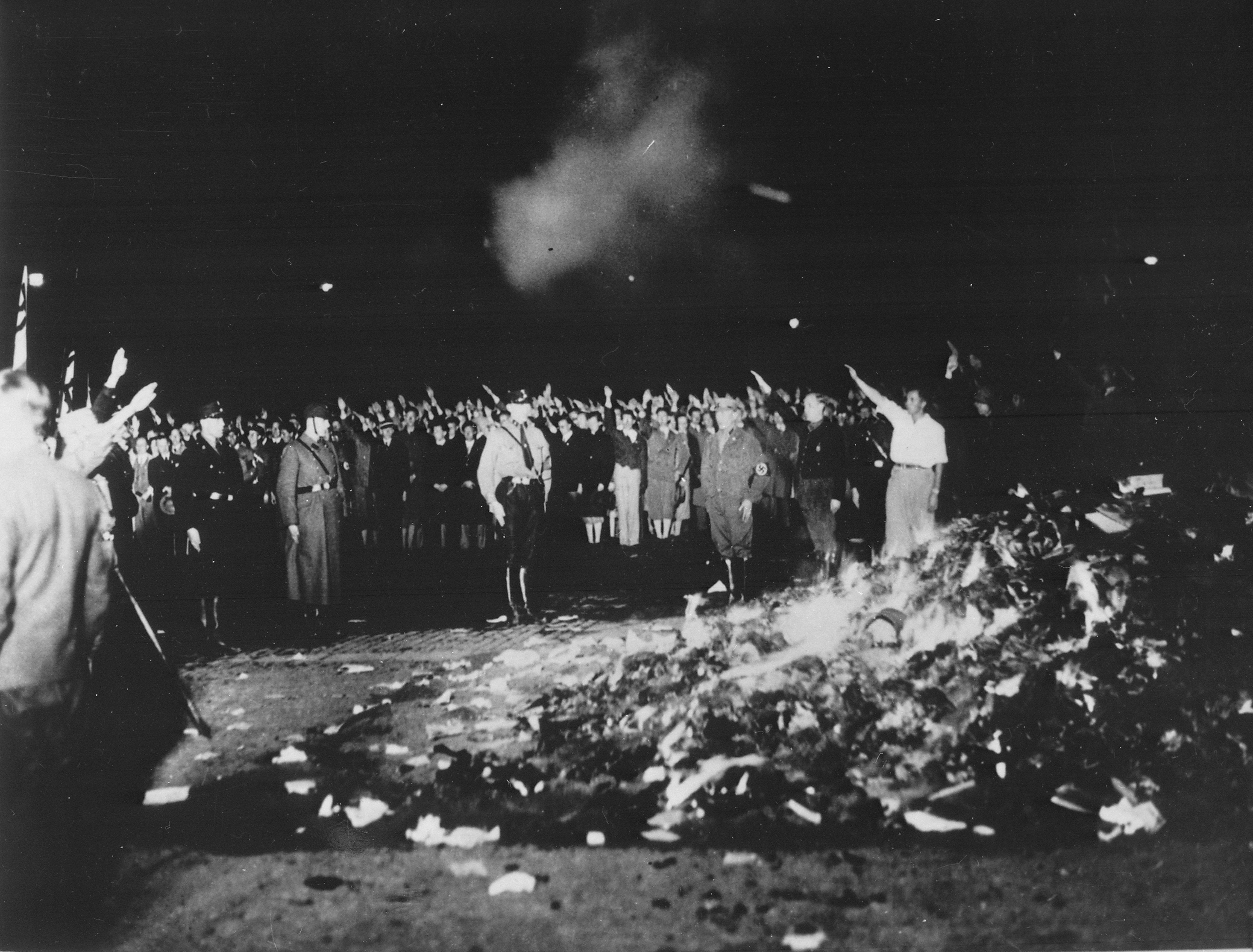
Nazi Party members at the Opernplatz book burning in Berlin, where books and research material from the Institute for Sexual Research were destroyed

It has been argued that the burning of the Institute for Sexual Research in 1933 by Nazi students was an act of memoricide.

The Israeli historian Ilan Pappé deployed the concept of cultural memoricide as systematic attempt of post-1948 Israel in relation to Palestine. Spanish historian Jorge Ramos Tolosa has also used this term in the context of the Zionist-Israeli practices in Palestine.

According to one account memoricide was employed by Greece toward Macedonians of Slavic origin.

Grmek used the term to describe activities of the rebel Serb forces in Croatia during the first year of the Croatian independence war.

== Memoricide of Native Americans ==
Under the objective definition of memoricide, it is substantiated that the United States has deployed memoricide in their genocide of Native American peoples.

One of the earliest instances of memoricide against a native tribe occurred during the Pequot War from 1636 to 1638, where colonial forces, aided by the Mohegan and Narragansett tribes, set fire to a Pequot village, effectively destroying dwellings and artifacts. Significant quantities of artifacts have been lost, though institutes and museums have recovered some, such as weapon heads, combs, and instruments, that honor their memory. The treaty after the massacre abolished the Pequot nation. Scholar Jeffrey Ostler wrote that "the war's ultimate cause was colonial expansion."

In 1779, U.S. troops burnt the lodgings and crops of the Haudenosaunee tribe, also known as the Iroquois tribe, after declaring war on them in what is known as the Sullivan Expedition. The United States’ objective, in George Washington’s words, was “the total destruction and devastation of their settlements,” in order to inhibit the nation’s capacity to wage war. Specifically, the Cayuga and Seneca Indian Nations of the Six Nations of the Iroquois were targeted. The campaign devastated 40 indigenous villages, reinforcing George Washington's nickname as "Town Destroyer."

In total, from the 1770s to 1815, United States military forces burned hundreds of Native American towns. Decimation spanned from the North in New York to the South in Alabama and Florida. The destruction of indigenous villages and residences is categorized as memoricide.

The institutionalization of memoricide was marked by the forced relocation of Native Americans in the 1830 Indian Removal Act. The act forced approximately 100,000 Native Americans to move to the west of the Mississippi river from their ancestral homelands. As reported by a team of researchers led by Yale School of the Environment Professor Justin Farrell, indigenous nations in the United States have lost 98.9% of their original and historical land as of October 2021.

From 1863 to 1864, under the Scorched earth policy, Union forces under Philip Sheridan and William Tecumseh Sherman forcibly removed the Navajo tribe, “burning houses and crops, slaughtering livestock and vandalizing properties” in Canyon de Chelly. Soldiers destroyed several thousand peach trees, culturally significant to the Navajo as a food source and symbol of independence.

In the 1870s to 1880s, the United States adopted a policy of forced assimilation and cultural extinction for native tribes, intending to deprive them of their self governance. With the Dawes Act of 1887, the United States attempted to destroy Indian reservations via a de facto land privatization system.

On June 2, 1924, the United States opened citizenship to Native Americans, with the Indian Citizenship Act. The act, joined with blood quantum laws, forced Native Americans who identified as mixed race to give up their tribal status, which damaged Indian cultural identity. The Civilization Fund Act established, funded, and forced Indian children to attend boarding schools across the country—367 altogether—with the incentive of erasing their language, culture, and identity. At the boarding schools, Indian children were banned from "speaking their native language, wearing traditional clothes, or carrying out traditional activities."

Rebecca Nagle alleges that information about Native Americans has been "systematically removed from mainstream media and popular culture." According to the National Indian Education Association, 87% of state-level U.S. history textbooks do not mention the history of indigenous people after the 19th century.

== See also ==
- Damnatio memoriae
- Desecration of graves
- Identity cleansing
- List of destroyed heritage
- Paper genocide
- Yimakh shemo

== Sources ==
- Anić, Vladimir; Goldstein, Ivo (2007). Rječnik stranih riječi [Dictionary of foreign words] (in Croatian). Novi Liber. ISBN 978-953-6045-49-5.
- Fuller, Matt; Owen, Leah (7 October 2022). "Nazi Gender Ideology, Memoricide, and the Attack on the Berlin Institute for Sexual Research". Peace Review. 34 (4): 529–540. doi:10.1080/10402659.2022.2131383.
- Jones, Adam (13 September 2010). Genocide: A Comprehensive Introduction. Routledge. ISBN 978-1-136-93796-5.
- Masalha, Nur (20 October 2014). The Zionist Bible: Biblical Precedent, Colonialism and the Erasure of Memory. Routledge. ISBN 978-1-317-54465-4.
- MRGI (1994). Minority Rights Group International Report. The Group. ISBN 9781897693407.
- Pavlaković, Vjeran; Pauković, Davor; Raos, Višeslav (1 September 2012). Confronting the Past: European Experiences. CPI/PSRC. ISBN 978-953-7022-26-6.
- Porteous, Douglas; Smith, Sandra E. (17 October 2001). Domicide: The Global Destruction Of Home. McGill-Queen's Press. ISBN 978-0-7735-2257-2.
- Ramos Tolosa, Jorge (3 August 2015). "«¿No hay eco en el eco?». El memoricidio de la Nakba y sus resistencias" ["Is there no echo within the echo?" The memory genocide of the Nakba and its resistance]. Revista de Estudios Internacionales Mediterráneos (in Spanish) (18): 164–186. ISSN 1887-4460.
- Rivera-Pagán, Luis N. (30 April 2015). Essays from the Margins. The Lutterworth Press. ISBN 978-0-7188-9400-9.
- Sémelin, Jacques; Hoffman, Stanley (2007). Purify and Destroy: The Political Uses of Massacre and Genocide. Columbia University Press. ISBN 978-0-231-14282-3.
- Webster, Scott (December 2024). "Revisiting memoricide: The everyday killing of memory". Memory Studies. 17 (6): 1408–1428. doi:10.1177/17506980231184564. ISSN 1750-6980.
