= Dawes Act =

US legislative act regulating Native American tribal lands

- Other short titles: Dawes Severalty Act of 1887
- Long title: An Act to provide for the allotment of lands in severalty to Indians on the various reservations, and to extend the protection of the laws of the United States and the Territories over the Indians, and for other purposes.
- Nicknames: General Allotment Act of 1887
- Enacted by: the 49th United States Congress
- Effective: February 8, 1887

Citations
- Public law: Pub. L. 49–105
- Statutes at Large: 24 Stat. 388

Codification
- Titles amended: 25 U.S.C.: Indians
- U.S.C. sections created: 25 U.S.C. ch. 9 § 331 et seq.

Legislative history
- Introduced in the Senate by Henry L. Dawes (R–MA); Signed into law by President Grover Cleveland on February 8, 1887

The Dawes Act of 1887 (also known as the General Allotment Act or the Dawes Severalty Act of 1887) regulated land rights on tribal territories within the United States. Named after Senator Henry L. Dawes of Massachusetts, it authorized the President of the United States to subdivide Native American (Indian) tribal communal landholdings into allotments for Native American heads of families and individuals. This would convert traditional systems of land tenure into a government-imposed system of private property by forcing Native Americans to "assume a capitalist and proprietary relationship with property" that did not previously exist in their cultures. Before private property could be dispensed, the government had to determine which Indians were eligible for allotments, which propelled an official search for a federal definition of "Indian-ness".

Although the act was passed in 1887, the federal government implemented the Dawes Act on a tribe-by-tribe basis thereafter. For example, in 1895, Congress passed the Hunter Act, which administered the Dawes Act among the Southern Ute. The nominal purpose of the act was to protect the property of the natives as well as to compel "their absorption into the American mainstream".

Native peoples who were deemed to be mixed-blood were granted U.S. citizenship, while others were "detribalized". Between 1887 and 1934, Native Americans ceded control of about 100 million acres of land (as of 2019 the United States has a total 1.9 billion acres of land) or about "two-thirds of the land base they held in 1887" as a result of the act. The loss of land ownership and the break-up of traditional leadership of tribes produced potentially negative cultural and social effects that have since prompted some scholars to consider the act as one of the most destructive U.S. policies for Native Americans in history.

The "Five Civilized Tribes" (Cherokee, Chickasaw, Choctaw, Muscogee, and Seminole) in Indian Territory were initially exempt from the Dawes Act. The Dawes Commission was established in 1893 as a delegation to register members of tribes for allotment of lands. They came to define tribal belonging in terms of blood-quantum. However, because there was no method of determining precise bloodlines, commission members often assigned "full-blood status" to Native Americans who were perceived as "poorly-assimilated" or "legally incompetent", and "mixed-blood status" to Native Americans who "most resembled whites", regardless of how they identified culturally.

The Curtis Act of 1898 extended the provisions of the Dawes Act to the "Five Civilized Tribes", required the abolition of their governments and dissolution of tribal courts, allotment of communal lands to individuals registered as tribal members, and sale of lands declared surplus. This law was "an outgrowth of the Land Rush of 1889, and completed the extinction of Indian land claims in the territory. This violated the promise of the United States that the Indian territory would remain Indian land in perpetuity," completed the obliteration of tribal land titles in Indian Territory, and prepared for admission of the territory land to the Union as the state of Oklahoma. The Dawes Act was amended again in 1906 under the Burke Act.

During the Great Depression, the Franklin D. Roosevelt administration passed the US Indian Reorganization Act (also known as the Wheeler-Howard Law) on June 18, 1934. It prohibited any further land allotment and created a "New Deal" for Native Americans, which renewed their rights to reorganize and form self-governments in order to "rebuild an adequate land base."

Recent literature has found evidence of sizable demographic impacts on native communities, with increases in child mortality and decreases in life expectancy of about 20%.

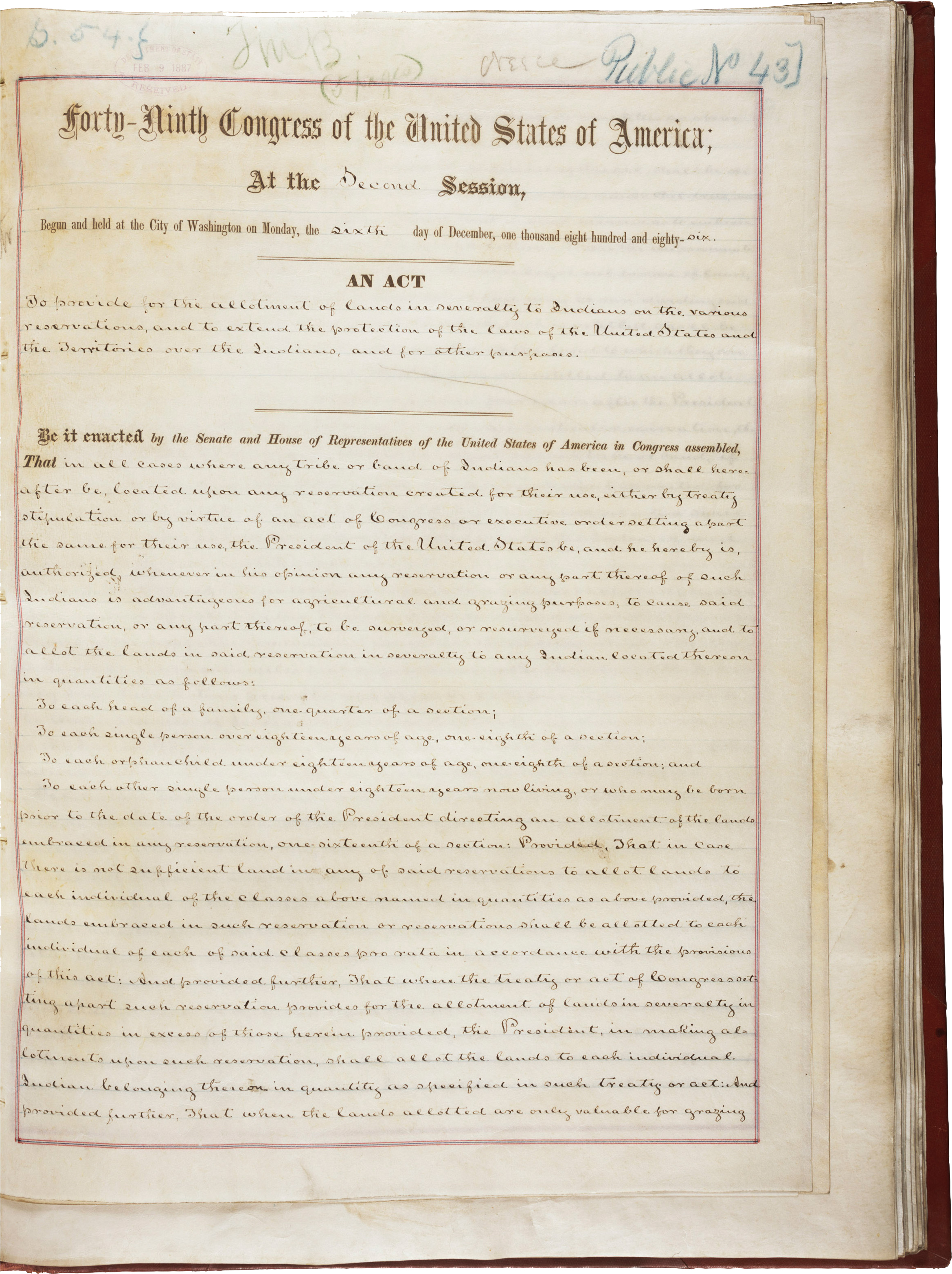
The first page of the Dawes Act

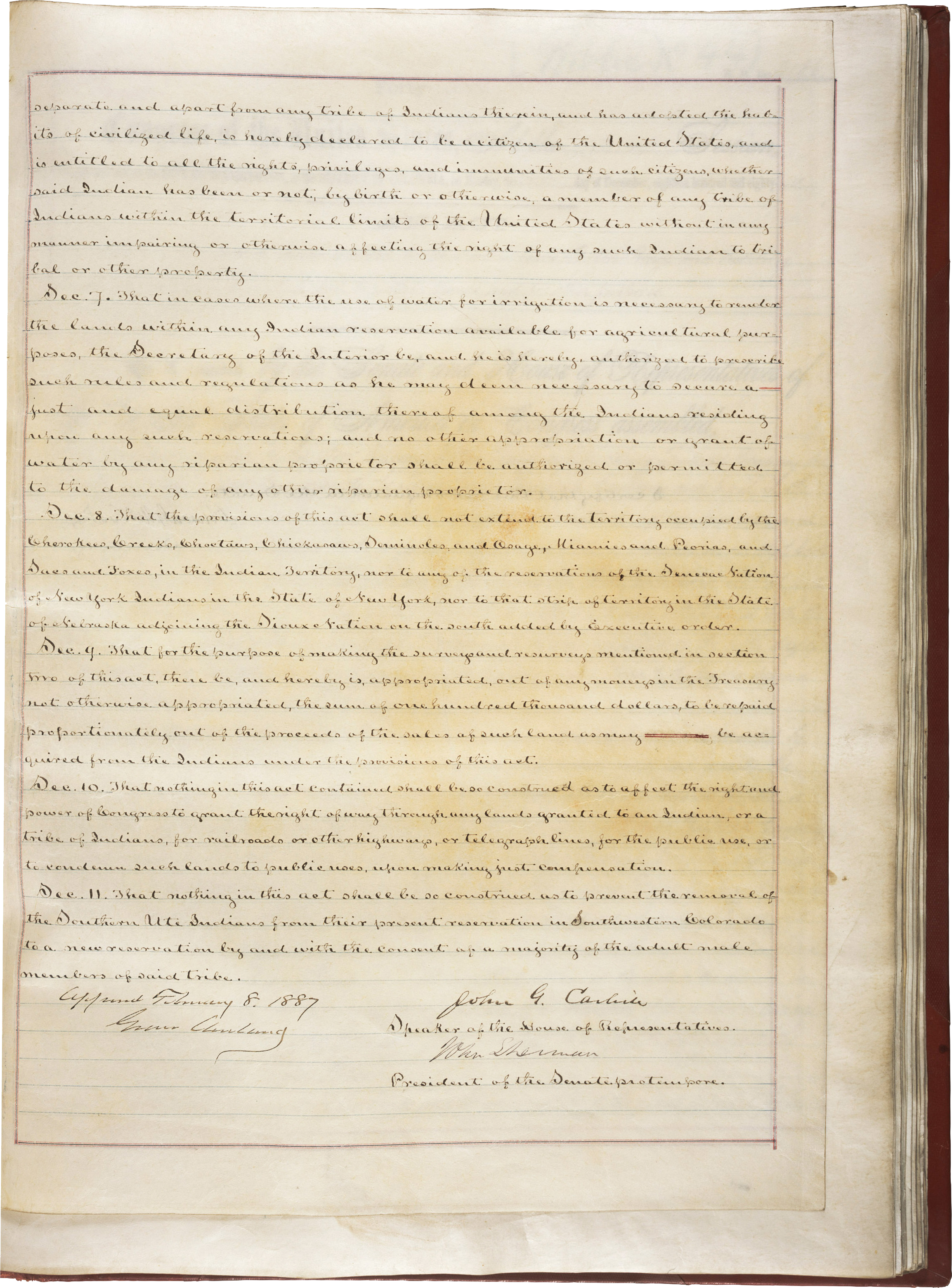
The second page of the Dawes Act

== Creation of reservations and assimilation ==
During the early 1800s, the United States federal government attempted to address what it referred to as the "Indian Problem." Numerous European immigrants were settling on the eastern border of the Indian territories (where most of the Native American tribes had been relocated). Conflicts between the groups increased as they competed for resources and operated according to different cultural systems. Searching for a quick solution to their problem, Commissioner of Indian Affairs William Medill proposed establishing "colonies" or "reservations" that would be exclusively for the natives, similar to those which some native tribes had created for themselves in the east. It was a form of relocation whereby the US government would offer a transfer of the natives from current locations to areas in the region beyond the Mississippi River. This would enable settlement by European Americans in the Southeast, where there was a growing demand for access to new lands.

The new policy intended to concentrate Native Americans in areas away from the new settlers. During the later nineteenth century, Native American tribes resisted the imposition of the reservation system and engaged with the United States Army (in what were called the Indian Wars in the West) for decades. Finally defeated by the U.S. military force and continuing waves of new settlers, the tribes negotiated agreements to resettle on reservations. Native Americans ended up with a total of over 155 million acres (630,000 km^{2}) of land, ranging from arid deserts to prime agricultural land.

The Reservation system, while compulsory for Native Americans, allotted each tribe a claim to their new lands, protection over their territories, and the right to govern themselves. With the U.S. Senate to be involved only for negotiation and ratification of treaties, the Native Americans adjusted their ways of life and tried to maintain their traditions. The traditional tribal organization, a defining characteristic of Native Americans as a social unit, became apparent to the non-native communities of the United States. The tribe was viewed as a highly cohesive group, led by a hereditary, chosen chief, who exercised power and influence among the members of the tribe by aging traditions.

By the end of the 1880s, some U.S. stakeholders felt that the assimilation of Native Americans into American culture was a top priority and was needed for the peoples' very survival. This was the belief among people who "admired" them, as well as people who thought they needed to leave behind their tribal landholding, reservations, traditions, and, ultimately, their Indian identities. Senator Henry Dawes launched a campaign to "rid the nation of tribalism through the virtues of private property, allotting land parcels to Indian heads of family."

On February 8, 1887, President Grover Cleveland signed the Dawes Allotment Act into law. Responsible for enacting the allotment of the tribal reservations into plots of land for individual households, the Dawes Act was intended by reformers to achieve six goals:

- breaking up of tribes as a social unit,
- encouraging individual initiatives,
- furthering the progress of native farmers,
- reducing the cost of native administration,
- securing parts of the reservations as Indian land, and
- opening the remainder of the land to White settlers for profit.

The Act facilitated assimilation; they would become more "Americanized" as the government allotted the reservations and the Indians adapted to subsistence farming, the primary model at the time. Native Americans held specific ideologies pertaining to tribal land. Some natives began to adapt to the culture. They adopted the values of the dominant society and saw land as real estate to be bought and developed; they learned how to use their land effectively to become prosperous farmers. As they were inducted as citizens of the country, they would shed those of their discourses and ideologies presumed to be uncivilized and exchange them for ones that allowed them to become industrious, self-supporting citizens, and finally rid themselves of their need for government supervision.

== Provisions of the Dawes Act ==
The important provisions of the Dawes Act were:

1. A head of family would receive a grant of 160 acres (65 ha), a single person or orphan over 18 years of age would receive a grant of 80 acres (32 ha), and persons under the age of 18 would receive 40 acres (16 ha) each;
2. the allotments would be held in trust by the U.S. Government for 25 years;
3. Eligible Native Americans had four years to select their land; afterward the selection would be made for them by the Secretary of the Interior.

Every member of the bands or tribes receiving a land allotment is subject to laws of the state or territory in which they reside. Every Native American who receives a land allotment "and has adopted the habits of civilized life" (lived separate and apart from the tribe) is bestowed with United States citizenship "without in any manner impairing or otherwise affecting the right of any such Indian to tribal or other property".

The Secretary of the Interior could issue rules to assure equal distribution of water for irrigation among the tribes, and provided that "no other appropriation or grant of water by any riparian proprietor shall be authorized or permitted to the damage of any other riparian proprietor."

The Dawes Act did not apply to the territory of the:

- Cherokee, Creek, Choctaw, Chickasaw, Seminole, Miami, and Peoria in Indian Territory
- Osage and Sac and Fox in the Oklahoma Territory
- any of the reservations of the Seneca Nation of New York, or
- a strip of territory in the State of Nebraska adjoining the Sioux Nation
- Red Lake Ojibwe Reservation
- The Osage Tribe of Oklahoma

Provisions were later extended to the Wea, Peoria, Kaskaskia, Piankeshaw, and Western Miami tribes by act of 1889. Allotment of the lands of these tribes was mandated by the Act of 1891, which amplified the provisions of the Dawes Act.

=== Dawes Act 1891 Amendments ===
In 1891 the Dawes Act was amended:

- Allowed for pro-rata distribution when the reservation did not have enough land for each individual to receive allotments in original quantities, and provided that when land is only suitable for grazing purposes, such land be allotted in double quantities
- Established criteria for inheritance
- Does not apply to Cherokee Outlet

=== Provisions of the Curtis Act ===
The Curtis Act of 1898 extended the provisions of the Dawes Act to the Five Civilized Tribes in Indian Territory. It did away with their self-government, including tribal courts. In addition to providing for allotment of lands to tribal members, it authorized the Dawes Commission to make determinations of members when registering tribal members.

=== Provisions of the Burke Act ===
The Burke Act of 1906 amended the sections of the Dawes Act dealing with US Citizenship (Section 6) and the mechanism for issuing allotments. The Secretary of Interior could force the Native American Allottee to accept title for land. U.S. Citizenship was granted unconditionally upon receipt of land allotment (the individual did not need to move off the reservation to receive citizenship). Land allotted to Native Americans was taken out of Trust and subject to taxation. The Burke Act did not apply to any Native Americans in Indian Territory.

== Effects ==
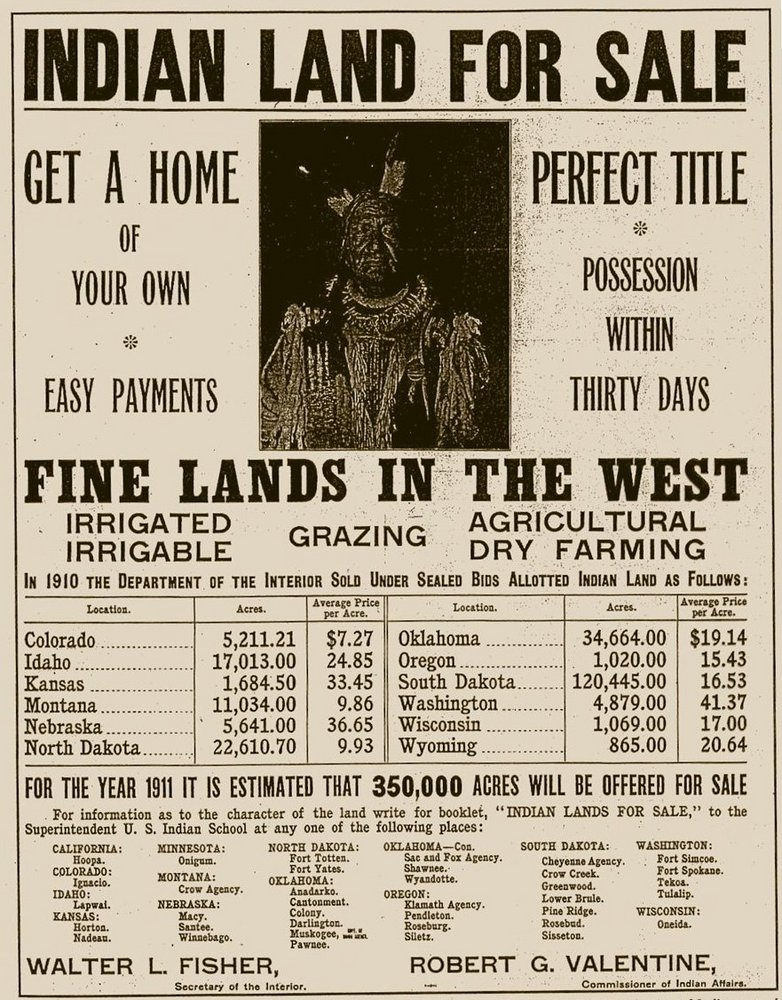
A 1911 ad offering "allotted Indian land" for sale

=== Identity and detribalization ===
The effects of the Dawes Act were destructive on Native American sovereignty, culture, and identity since it empowered the U.S. government to:

1. legally preempt the sovereign right of Indians to define themselves
2. implement the specious notion of blood-quantum as the legal criteria for defining Indians
3. institutionalize divisions between "full-bloods" and "mixed-bloods"
4. "detribalize" a sizeable segment of the Indian population
5. legally appropriate vast tracts of Indian land

The federal government initially viewed the Dawes Act as such a successful democratic experiment that they decided to further explore the use of blood-quantum laws and the notion of federal recognition as the qualifying means for "dispensing other resources and services such as health care and educational funding" to Native Americans long after its passage. Under Dawes, land parcels were dispersed in accordance with perceived blood quanta. Indigenous people labeled "full-blooded" were allocated "relatively small parcels of land deeded with trust patents over which the government retained complete control for a minimum of twenty-five years." Those who were labeled "mixed-blood" were "deeded larger and better tracts of land, with 'patents in fee simple' (complete control), but were also forced to accept U.S. citizenship and relinquish tribal status."

Additionally, Native Americans who did not "meet the established criteria" as being either "full-blood" or "mixed-blood" were effectively "detribalized", being "deposed of their American Indian identity and displaced from their homelands, discarded into the nebula of American otherness." While the Dawes Act is "typically recognized" as the "primary instigation of divisions between tribal and detribalized Indians," the history of detribalization in the United States "actually precedes Dawes."

=== Land loss ===
The Dawes Act ended Native American communal holding of property (with cropland often being privately owned by families or clans), by which they had ensured that everyone had a home and a place in the tribe. The act "was the culmination of American attempts to destroy tribes and their governments and to open Indian lands to settlement by non-Indians and to development by railroads." Land owned by Native Americans decreased from 138 million acres (560,000 km^{2}) in 1887 to 48 million acres (190,000 km^{2}) in 1934.

Senator Henry M. Teller of Colorado was one of the most outspoken opponents of allotment. In 1881, he said that allotment was a policy "to despoil the Indians of their lands and to make them vagabonds on the face of the earth." Teller also said,

the real aim [of allotment] was to get at the Indian lands and open them up to settlement. The provisions for the apparent benefit of the Indians are but the pretext to get at his lands and occupy them. ... If this were done in the name of greed, it would be bad enough; but to do it in the name of humanity ... is infinitely worse.

In 1890, Dawes himself remarked about the incidence of Native Americans losing their land allotments to settlers: "I never knew a White man to get his foot on an Indian's land who ever took it off." The amount of land in native hands rapidly depleted from some 150 million acres (610,000 km^{2}) to 78 million acres (320,000 km^{2}) by 1900. The remainder of the land, once allotted to appointed natives, was declared surplus and sold to non-native settlers as well as railroad and other large corporations; other sections were converted into federal parks and military compounds.

Most allottees given land on the Great Plains were not successful at achieving economic viability via farming. Division of land among heirs upon the allottees' deaths quickly led to land fractionalization. Most allotment land, which could be sold after a statutory period of 25 years, was eventually sold to non-Native buyers at bargain prices. Additionally, land deemed to be surplus beyond what was needed for allotment was opened to White settlers, though the profits from the sales of these lands were often invested in programs meant to aid the Native Americans. Over the 47 years of the Act's life, Native Americans lost about 90 million acres (360,000 km^{2}) of treaty land, or about two-thirds of the 1887 land base. About 90,000 Native Americans, or around two-thirds of their population, were made landless.

=== Culture and gender roles ===
The Dawes Act compelled Native Americans to adopt European American culture by prohibiting Indigenous cultural practices and encouraging settler cultural practices and ideologies into Native American families and children. By transferring communally-owned Native land into private property, the Office of Indian Affairs (OIA) "hoped to transform Native Americans into yeoman farmers and farm wives through the assignment of individual land holdings known as allotments." In an attempt to fulfill this objective, the Dawes Act "outlawed Native American culture and established a code of Indian offenses regulating individual behavior according to Euro-American norms of conduct." Any violations of this code were to be "tried in a Court of Indian Offenses on each reservation." Included with the Dawes Act were "funds to instruct Native Americans in Euro-American patterns of thought and behavior through Indian Service schools."

With the seizure of many Native American land holdings, indigenous structures of domestic life, gender roles, and tribal identity were critically altered in order to meld with society. For instance, "an important objective of the Dawes Act was to restructure Native American gender roles." White settlers who encountered Native American societies in the latter half of the nineteenth century "judged women's work [in Native societies] as lower in status than that of men" and assumed it was a sign of indigenous women's "disempowerment and drudgery". As a result, "in evolutionary terms, Whites saw women's performance of what seemed to be male tasks – farming, home building, and supply gathering – as a corruption of gender roles and an impediment to progress." In theory, the gendered tasks "accorded many indigenous women esteem and even rewards and status within their tribes."

By dividing reservation lands into privately owned parcels, legislators hoped to complete the assimilation process by forcing Native Americans to adopt individual households and strengthen the nuclear family and values of economic dependency strictly within this small household unit. The Dawes Act was thus implemented to destroy "native cultural patterns" by drawing "on theories, common to both ethnologists and material feminists, that saw environmental change as a way to effect social change." Although private property ownership was the cornerstone of the act, reformers "believed that civilization could only be effected by concomitant changes to social life" in indigenous communities. As a result, "they promoted Christian marriages among indigenous people, forced families to regroup under male heads (a tactic often enforced by renaming), and trained men in wage-earning occupations while encouraging women to support them at home through domestic activities."

=== Reduction of sovereignty ===
In 1906, the Burke Act (also known as the Forced Patenting Act) amended the GAA to give the Secretary of the Interior the power to issue allottees a patent in fee simple to people classified "competent and capable". The criteria for this determination is unclear but it meant that allottees deemed "competent" by the Secretary of the Interior would have their land taken out of trust status, subject to taxation, and could be sold by the allottee. The allotted lands of Native Americans determined to be incompetent by the Secretary of the Interior were automatically leased out by the federal government. The act reads:

... the Secretary of the Interior may, in his discretion, and he is hereby authorized, whenever he shall be satisfied that any Native American allottee is competent and capable of managing his or her affairs at any time to cause to be issued to such allottee a patent in fee simple, and thereafter all restrictions as to sale, encumbrance, or taxation of said land shall be removed.

The use of competence opens up the categorization, making it much more subjective and thus increasing the exclusionary power of the Secretary of Interior. Although this act gave power to the allottee to decide whether to keep or sell the land, given the harsh economic reality of the time, and lack of access to credit and markets, liquidation of Indian lands was almost inevitable. It was known by the Department of Interior that virtually 95% of fee-patented land would eventually be sold to whites.

In 1926, Secretary of the Interior Hubert Work commissioned a study of the federal administration of Indian policy and the condition of Native American people. Completed in 1928, The Problem of Indian Administration – commonly known as the Meriam Report after the study's director, Lewis Meriam – documented fraud and misappropriation by government agents. In particular, the Meriam Report claimed that the General Allotment Act had been used to illegally deprive Native Americans of their land rights.

After considerable debate, Congress terminated the allotment process under the Dawes Act by enacting the Indian Reorganization Act of 1934 ("Wheeler-Howard Act"). However, the allotment process in Alaska, under the separate Alaska Native Allotment Act, continued until its revocation in 1971 by the Alaska Native Claims Settlement Act.

Despite the termination of the allotment process in 1934, the effects of the General Allotment Act continue into the present. For example, one provision of the Act was the establishment of a trust fund, administered by the Bureau of Indian Affairs, to collect and distribute revenues from oil, mineral, timber, and grazing leases on Native American lands. The BIA's alleged improper management of the trust fund resulted in litigation, in particular the case Cobell v. Kempthorne (settled in 2009 for $3.4 billion), to force a proper accounting of revenues.

=== Fractionation ===
For over one hundred thirty years, the consequences of federal Indian allotments have developed into the problem of fractionation. As original allottees die, their heirs receive equal, undivided interests in the allottees' lands. In successive generations, smaller undivided interests descend to the next generation. Fractionated interests in individual Native American allotted land continue to expand exponentially with each new generation.

In 2004, Ross Swimmer, Special Trustee for American Indians at the U.S. Department of the Interior, stated that there were "approximately four million owner interests in the 10,000,000 acres (40,000 km^{2}) of individually owned trust lands, a situation the magnitude of which makes management of trust assets extremely difficult and costly." "These four million interests could expand to eleven million interests by the year 2030 unless an aggressive approach to fractionation is taken." "There are now single pieces of property with ownership interests that are less than 0.0000001% or 1/9 millionth of the whole interest, which has an estimated value of 0.004 cent."

The economic consequences of fractionation are severe. Some recent appraisal studies suggest that when the number of owners of a tract of land reaches between ten and twenty, the value of that tract drops to zero.

In addition, the fractionation of land and the resultant ballooning number of trust accounts quickly produced an administrative nightmare. Over the past 40 years, the area of trust land has grown by approximately 80,000 acres (320 km^{2}) per year. Approximately 357 million dollars is collected annually from all sources of trust asset management, including coal sales, timber harvesting, oil and gas leases and other rights-of-way and lease activity. No single fiduciary institution has ever managed as many trust accounts as the Department of the Interior has managed over the last century.

Interior is involved in "the management of 100,000 leases for individual [Native Americans] and tribes on trust land that encompasses approximately 56,000,000 acres (230,000 km^{2}). Leasing, use permits, sale revenues, and interest of approximately $226 million per year are collected for approximately 230,000 individual Indian money [(IIM)] accounts, and about $530 million per year are collected for approximately 1,400 tribal accounts. In addition, the trust currently manages approximately $2.8 billion in tribal funds and $400 million in individual Native American funds."

"Under current regulations, probates need to be conducted for every account with trust assets, even those with balances between one cent and one dollar. While the average cost for a probate process exceeds $3,000, even a streamlined, expedited process...costing as little as $500 would require almost $10,000,000 to probate the $5,700 in these accounts."

"Unlike most private trusts, the federal government bears the entire cost of administering the Indian trust. As a result, the usual incentives found in the commercial sector for reducing the number of small or inactive accounts do not apply to the Indian trust. Similarly, the United States has not adopted many of the tools that States and local government entities have for ensuring that unclaimed or abandoned property is returned to productive use within the local community."

Fractionation is not a new issue. In the 1920s, the Brookings Institution conducted a major study of the conditions of the Native Americans and included data on the impacts of fractionation. This report, which became known as the Meriam Report, was issued in 1928. Its conclusions and recommendations formed the basis for land reform provisions that were included in what would become the IRA. "The original versions of the IRA included two key titles; one dealing with probate and the other with land consolidation." Because of opposition to many of these provisions in Indian Country, often by the major European-American ranchers and industry who leased land and other private interests, most were removed while Congress was considering the bill. The final version of the IRA included only a few basic land reforms and probate measures. Although Congress enabled major reforms in the structure of tribes through the IRA and stopped the allotment process, it did not meaningfully address fractionation as had been envisioned by John Collier, then Commissioner of Indian Affairs, or the Brookings Institution.

"In 1922, the General Accounting Office (GAO) conducted an audit of 12 reservations to determine the severity of fractionation on those reservations. The GAO found that on the 12 reservations for which it compiled data, there were approximately 80,000 discrete owners but, because of fractionation, there were over a million ownership records associated with those owners. The GAO also found that if the land were physically divided by the fractional interests, many of these interests would represent less than one square foot of ground. In early 2002, the Department of the Interior attempted to replicate the audit methodology used by the GAO and to update the GAO report data to assess the continued growth of fractionation." It found that it increased by more than 40% between 1992 and 2002.

"As an example of continuing fractionation, consider a real tract identified in 1987 in Hodel v. Irving, 481 U.S. 704 (1987):

Tract 1305 is 40 acres (160,000 m^{2}) and produces $1,080 in income annually. It is valued at $8,000. It has 439 owners, one-third of whom receive less than $.05 in annual rent and two-thirds of whom receive less than $1. The largest interest holder receives $82.85 annually. The common denominator used to compute fractional interests in the property is 3,394,923,840,000. The smallest heir receives $.01 every 177 years. If the tract were sold (assuming the 439 owners could agree) for its estimated $8,000 value, he would be entitled to $.000418. The administrative costs of handling this tract are estimated by the Bureau of Indian Affairs at $17,560 annually.

Today, this tract produces $2,000 in income annually and is valued at $22,000. It now has 505 owners but the common denominator used to compute fractional interests has grown to 220,670,049,600,000. If the tract were sold (assuming the 505 owners could agree) for its estimated $22,000 value, the smallest heir would now be entitled to $.00001824." The administrative costs of handling this tract in 2003 are estimated by the BIA at $42,800."

Fractionation has become significantly worse. As noted above, in some cases the land is so highly fractionated that it can never be made productive. With such small ownership interests, "it is nearly impossible to obtain the level of consent necessary to lease the land." "In addition, to manage highly fractionated parcels of land, the government spends more money probating estates, maintaining title records, leasing the land, and attempting to manage and distribute tiny amounts of income to individual owners than is received in income from the land. In many cases, the costs associated with managing these lands can be significantly more than the value of the underlying asset."

== Criticisms ==
Angie Debo's And Still the Waters Run: The Betrayal of the Five Civilized Tribes (1940) claimed the allotment policy of the Dawes Act (as later extended to apply to the Five Civilized Tribes through the Dawes Commission and the Curtis Act of 1898) was systematically manipulated to deprive the Native Americans of their lands and resources. Ellen Fitzpatrick claimed that Debo's book "advanced a crushing analysis of the corruption, moral depravity, and criminal activity that underlay White administration and execution of the allotment policy."

== See also ==
- Act for the Protection of the People of Indian Territory (Curtis Act), 1898
- Forced Fee Patenting Act (Burke Act), 1906
- Indian Reorganization Act
- Nelson Act of 1889, Minnesota's version of the Dawes Act
- Aboriginal title in the United States
- Competency Commission
- Land run
- Diminishment
- Great Māhele
- Indian Kansas
- Land Buy-Back Program for Tribal Nations
- Checkerboarding (land)
- Indian Removal
- Detraditionalization
- Detribalization
- Tribal disenrollment
- Indian termination policy
- Lakota people
