= John Henry Oberly =

Commissioner of Indian Affairs

John Henry Oberly (September 1836 – April 15, 1899) served as commissioner of Indian Affairs (October 10, 1888 – June 30, 1889) under Grover Cleveland's administration, playing a pivotal role in adjusting the agency's policy after the Dawes Act. Before the Cleveland administration, he worked as an editor and journalist for Cairo Bulletin and Chicago Tribune. He won a seat in the Illinois House of Representatives in 1880 and served as the executive chairman of the Illinois Democratic Party. His progressive stance on reform caught the attention of the governor of New York, Governor Cleveland. When Cleveland became president, he appointed John H. Oberly as superintendent of Indian Schools. Oberly professionalized these schools, curtailing Indian agents discretion to choose the administrators and teachers. President Cleveland approved of his work and made him a United States Civil Service commissioner. Upon the resignation of Johnathan D. C. Atkin, Oberly became the commissioner of Indian Affairs. Oberly resigned his post in 1889 and returned to the newspaper business when Benjamin Harrison won the 1888 United States presidential election.
