= Meriam Report =

1928 report

The Meriam Report (1928) (official title: The Problem of Indian Administration) was commissioned by the Institute for Government Research (IGR, better known later as the Brookings Institution) and funded by the Rockefeller Foundation. The IGR appointed Lewis Meriam to be the technical director of the survey team to compile information and report on the conditions of American Indians across the country. Meriam submitted the 847-page report to the secretary of the interior, Hubert Work, on February 21, 1928.

The report combined narrative with statistics to criticize the Department of Interior's (DOI) implementation of the Dawes Act and overall conditions on reservations and in Indian boarding schools. The Meriam Report was the first general study of Indian conditions since the 1850s, when the ethnologist and former US Indian Agent Henry R. Schoolcraft had completed a six-volume work for the US Congress.

The Meriam Report provided much of the data used to reform American Indian policy through new legislation: the Indian Reorganization Act of 1934. It strongly influenced succeeding policies in land allotment, education, and health care. The report found generally that the federal government was failing at its goals of protecting Native Americans, their land, and their resources, both personal and cultural.

== Lewis Meriam ==
Lewis Meriam was born in Salem, Massachusetts, in 1883. He received degrees in English and government from Harvard University, law degrees from the National Law School and George Washington University, and a Ph.D. from the Brookings Institution. He worked for several government bureaus both before and after his work on the Indian Survey, including the bureaus of Census and Children's Welfare.

In 1926, Interior Secretary Hubert Work chose Meriam to head a survey team to investigate Indian Affairs because of his experience with the technical study of government operations, as well as his expertise in government administration. Meriam spent three years working on this project, which became known as the "Meriam Commission" or the "Meriam Report". His involvement in Indian affairs ended in 1936 because of his skepticism of the New Deal.

In 1946 he was appointed as Vice President of the Brookings Institution. He died in Kensington, Maryland, on October 30, 1972.

== Survey team ==
Meriam had difficulty choosing a team because many of the prospective members could not leave their jobs. The IGR required team members to be "persons highly qualified as specialists in their respective fields, scientific in their approach, not sensationalists, and free from preconceived views and opinions that would interfere with their impartiality and fairness in gathering and interpreting the facts." He finally gathered a team composed of several specialists in a variety of disciplines: Ray A. Brown (legal aspects), Henry Roe Cloud (Indian adviser), Edward Everett Dale (economic conditions), Emma Duke (Indian migration to urban areas), Dr. Herbert Edwards (physician) (health), Fayette Avery McKenzie (source materials), Mary Louise Mark (family life), W. Carson Ryan, Jr. (education), and William J. Spillman (agriculture).

== Findings ==
Authorized by the Institute for Government Research on June 12, 1926, at the request of the Secretary of the Interior, the Meriam Commission was charged with investigating the affairs of Indians in the United States. To maintain unbiased standards for the survey, it was financed by the Rockefeller Foundation, not by any government agency or agent. "The investigation would cover nearly all reservations and would deal with educational, industrial, social, and medical activities of the BIA [Bureau of Indian Affairs], as well as with Indian property rights and economic conditions."

The team conducted seven months of field work to gather its information. It conducted field work in 23 states, selected based on a report by the Bureau of Indian Affairs that arranged states in order of number of Native American inhabitants. The report showed 23 states having more than 1,000 Native American inhabitants, the top three being Oklahoma, Arizona, and South Dakota. The team visited a total of 95 reservations, agencies, hospitals, and schools. At least one member of the survey team visited each of these 95 locations; often members of the team were forced to work independently in order to complete the required work in the shortest possible amount of time. "[Interior Secretary] Work insisted that the survey be completed within one year, so that he might effect changes before a new administration took office in Washington." This field work produced a report of 847 pages consisting of the following eight sections:

1. A General Policy for Indian Affairs
2. Health
3. Education
4. General Economic Conditions
5. Family and Community Life & the Activities of Women
6. The Migrated Indians
7. The Legal Aspects of the Indian Problem
8. The Missionary Activities among the Indians

The conclusion of the report reflects the opinions of the survey team. For example, the report states that "any policy for Indians based on the notion that they can or should be kept permanently isolated from other Americans is bound to fail." In the report, the survey team included extensive recommendations for the correction of deficiencies, notably in health, education, and government cooperation for legal and social issues.

=== Health ===
The report states, "the health of the Indians compared with that of the general population is bad." In its section on health care services provided by the government to Native Americans, the report states: "The hospitals, salutatorian, and sanatorium schools maintained by the [Indian Health] Service, despite a few exceptions, must generally be characterized as lacking in personnel, equipment, management, and design." The government, although it had numerous on- and off-reservation health care institutions, did not provide sufficient care for Indian patients. The report noted, "the most important single item affecting health is probably the food supply." A further setback facing healthcare on Indian reservations was a general lack of knowledge of the Indian languages by healthcare providers.

=== Economy ===
The report concluded that "The income of the typical Indian family is low and the earned income extremely low." The report addressed the poverty thought to have resulted from the individual allotment policy of the Dawes Act. It found: "In justice to the Indians it should be said that many of them are living on lands from which a trained and experienced white man could scarcely wrest a reasonable living." Not only was the loss of land a factor in reservation poverty found on reservations, but the land they held was largely unsuitable for family farming and agriculture. The report identified the problems with changing political appointees under elected presidential administrations. Elections tended to bring about a change in top political appointees and changes in economic development programs; thus, the BIA supported no long-term development on reservations. The report also states: "Little attempt has been made to formulate a broad constructive program for the service as a whole, extending over a long term of years, and having for its goal the general improvement of economic conditions."

=== Education ===
The Meriam Report emphasized the need for education but it suggested that such education should be based on the integration of Indian children into the majority culture, rather than educating Indian children in separate institutions, as previous education policies had stressed. The first line in the education section states, "The most fundamental need in Indian education is a change in point of view." The report was particularly critical of Indian boarding schools: "The survey staff finds itself obligated to say frankly and unequivocally that the provisions for the care of the Indian children in boarding schools are grossly inadequate." The survey team concluded that the boarding schools provided poor diet, were overcrowded, did not provide sufficient medical services, were supported by student labor, and relied on a uniform curriculum rather than raising teacher standards. While the report drew attention to the gross deficiencies of Indian boarding school education, the assimilationist policies of Indian education, dependent on such boarding schools, continued for another 40 years. The schools reached their peak student enrollment of 60,000 in the 1970s.

== Results ==
The Meriam Report can be seen to have affected several aspects of government policy: "Acting upon the emergency recommendations of the Meriam Report, President Hoover requested additional funds to supply adequate food and clothing for pupils in the Indian schools." Additionally, Charles J. Rhoads and J. Henry Scattergood (Commissioner and Assistant Commissioner of Indian Affairs, appointed by Hoover), accomplished or initiated many of the recommendations of the Meriam Report. President Hoover appointed Rhoads to put together a reform package which included the closure of unpopular reservation boarding schools and improved medical facilities. However, nothing was immediately done to change the allotted land situation, which caused disappointment among Native Americans. They would have to wait until 1934 for the policy of allotment to come to an end.

The most significant and influential effect of the Meriam Report was its strong criticism of the Dawes Act and analysis of its failings. Also known as the General Allotment Act, the Dawes Act of 1887 had sought to break up the communal Indian land by allocating allotments to individual Indian households, encouraging families to undertake subsistence farming, the model of European-American culture.

The immediate result of the report's attack on [land] allotment was a decline in the issuance of allotted lands. In the four fiscal years prior to the initiation of the study, 1922–1926, approximately 10,000 Native Americans were allotted over 3 million acres from their Reservations. In comparison, during the fiscal years 1929-1932, the 4 years immediately following the publication of 'The Problem of Indian Administration,' a little over 2,800 Native Americans were allotted less than 500,000 acres.

Within five years of the Report, the policy of allotment was abandoned altogether. On June 18, 1934, President Franklin D. Roosevelt signed the Indian Reorganization Act into law. Although the Meriam report had condemned allotment and affected the Indian Reorganization Act, the Act was actually largely attributed to John Collier who had been appointed by Roosevelt as Commissioner for Indian Affairs. The new Act ended allotment and permitted tribes to organize their own governments and to incorporate their trust lands communally.

== See also ==
- Competency Commission
- American Indian outing programs
