= Estelle Reel =

American educator

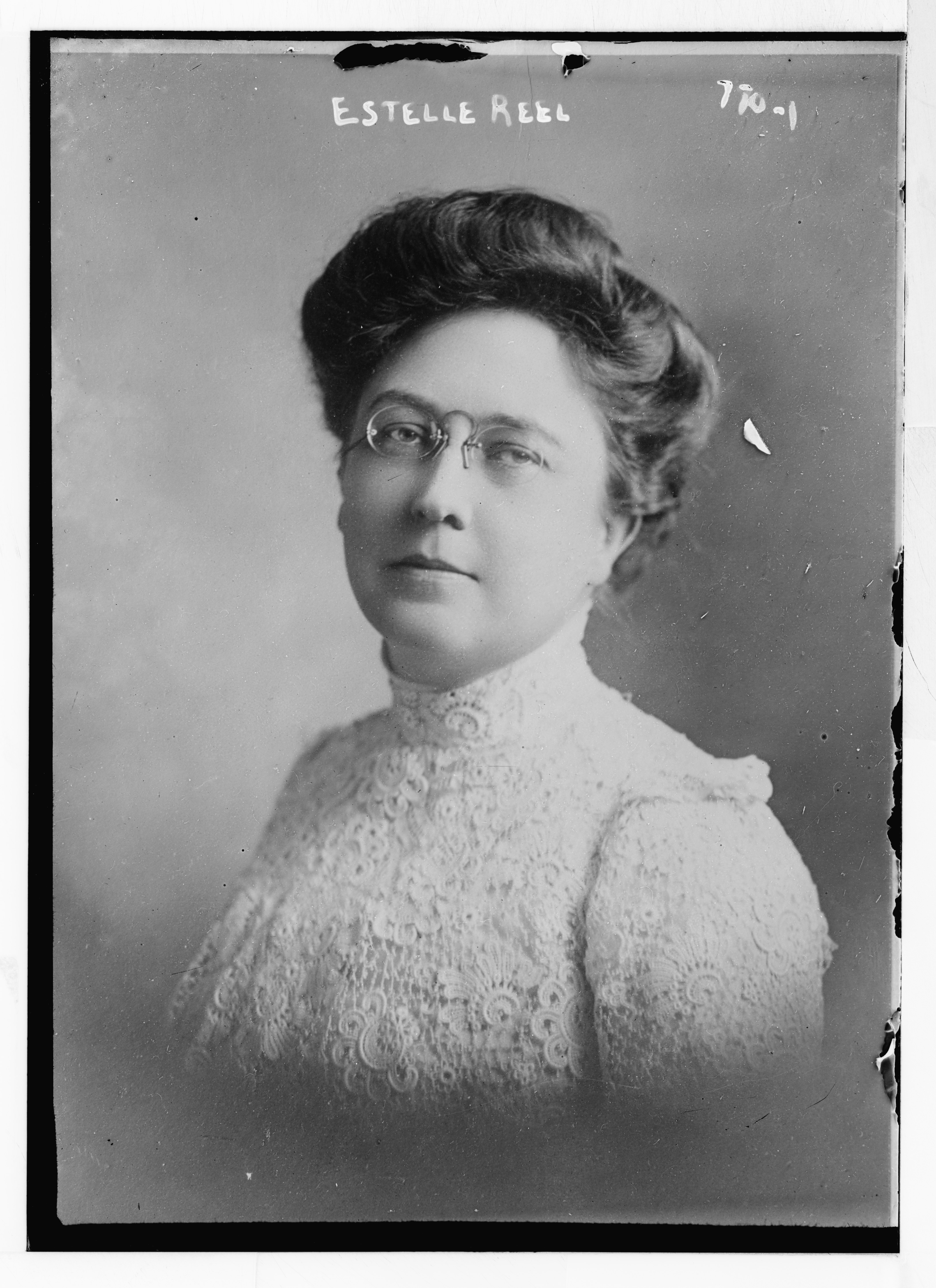
Estelle Reel, glass negative by George Grantham Bain

Estelle Reel (1862 - August 2, 1959) was an educator and the first woman elected to Wyoming public office as the State Superintendent of Public Instruction in 1895. She was appointed as the national Superintendent of Indian Schools by President William McKinley in 1898, becoming the first woman to hold a federal appointment requiring Senate ratification.

Reel played a significant role in the history of the American Indian education system. As the national Superintendent of Indian Schools (1898–1910) her federal policies focused on the cultural assimilation and removal of indigenous children from their homes.

== Early life ==
Estelle Reel was born in Pittsfield, Illinois in 1862. She began working as a teacher at Central School in Cheyenne, Wyoming in 1886. She campaigned and was elected School Superintendent of Laramie County, Wyoming in 1891, and reelected in 1894.

== State campaign ==
Reel received the Republican nomination for Wyoming superintendent of public instruction in 1894. Her campaign was successful despite sensationalized reports by her opponents who believed the office's duties too complex for a woman to handle. Reports published in the Chicago Tribune and The New York Times accused Reel of sending her photograph in "perfumed letters" to lonely cowboys to secure their votes. The story has shown remarkable staying power in the popular imagination and has been repeated as historical fact as recently as 2004.

== State office ==
Reel's school oversight duties as Wyoming State Superintendent of Public Instruction also included responsibilities as the secretary of the State Board of Land Commissioners. State schools were funded by public land leases and sales. She is credited with significantly increasing revenue through her management of state public lands. During her time in office, Reel was also appointed secretary of the State Board of Charities and Reform of Wyoming, responsible for oversight of state asylums and prisons.

Reel supported standardized curriculum and published a pamphlet of guidelines in 1897 titled "Outline Course of Study for Wyoming Public Schools". She also supported the distribution of free textbooks and standardized teacher certification. Although no progress on these priorities was made during her tenure, laws authorizing free textbooks and statewide teacher certification were approved in Wyoming in 1899.

== Federal appointment ==
Reel campaigned for William McKinley in 1898. He nominated her for the Superintendent of Indian Schools after his successful presidential election. Reel's office was in charge of 250 Indian schools, both boarding and day schools on and off reservations. She relocated to Washington D.C. and reportedly traveled between 41,000 and 65,900 miles visiting Indian schools in the United States in the first three years of her tenure.

Reel's main aims while in office included creating a uniform curriculum and promoting a law to make school compulsory for American Indian children. She published a uniform curriculum for Indian schools in 1901. She is also credited with creating the Department of Indian Education under the National Education Association.

== Life after public service ==
Reel resigned from office in 1910 to marry Cort F. Meyer, a Toppenish, Washington rancher and farmer.

== Legacy and criticism ==
Reel's legacy as a suffragist and politician is not well known despite being one of the first woman elected to statewide office in the United States, and the "highest-ranking woman of her day to serve in the federal government." She is primarily criticized for her assimilation-focused and child removal policies as the national Superintendent of Indian Schools, and her personal connections to transfers of allotted Indian lands into the hands of non-Indians.

=== American Indian curriculum ===
Reel is critiqued as being responsible for the decline of American Indian schools during her tenure. Her office's maternalist policies were based on racist ideologies viewing Indians as inferior to whites and created curriculum to assimilate American Indian children into white society and culture. In 1901 she authored a textbook "Course of study for the Indian schools of the United States : industrial and literary" containing instruction to transform traditional Indian family life through domestic and vocational assimilation.

Mainstream popularity of American Indian visual arts created a strong market for student produced traditional crafts. Reel saw traditional native crafts as culturally benign and supported their fostering and preservation, particularly those made by women, as a potential economic resource for Indian families and communities.

Reel played an active role removing American Indian children from their homes and placing them in boarding schools. As the national Superintendent for Indian Education she proposed a law to make school compulsory for Indian children, with or without the consent of their parents.
