= Competency Commission =

20th century US government policy

Competency Commissions were established by the United States Government in the early 20th century to determine whether individual Indians were competent to utilize their lands allotted to them during the General Allotment Act of 1887. Individuals who were determined to be competent were issued fee patents on their land. The lands of Indian allottees determined to be non-competent were leased by the Federal Government, often to non-tribal members.

While a fee patent gives power to the allottee to decide whether to keep or sell the land, provided the harsh economic reality of the time, lack of access to credit and markets, liquidation of Indian lands was almost inevitable. It was known by the department of interior that virtually 95% of fee patented land would eventually be sold to whites.

Indians who were determined to be non-competent often did not receive the income generated from the leasing of their lands. In 1996, the largest class-action lawsuit ever launched against the U.S. Government, Cobell vs. Norton, was filed on behalf of 300,000 trust fund beneficiaries who offered to settle for 27 billion dollars.

== See also ==
- Reservation diminishment
- Reservation checkerboarding
- Former Indian reservations
