= Detraditionalization =

Erosion of tradition in religion

In social theory, detraditionalization refers to the erosion of tradition in religion (secularization, agnosticism, religious disaffiliation) and society in postmodernism.

Subscribing individuals in traditional societies believe in established, timeless, authoritative orders and values, above the individual, and timeless attainable goals. Such beliefs may manifest as specific behavior.

Factors that contribute to loss of tradition are endorsement of individual choice and responsibility or the "sacred" (in Émile Durkheim's sense of the term) individual itself in democratic societies, and the revolution in communications. Among the theorists who believe that society is moving from a modernity that has been largely traditional to a post-traditional time is Anthony Giddens, Baron Giddens.

== See also ==
- Personal development
- Economic freedom, Individualism and Economic Order
- solipsism, egocentrism
- Fin de siècle, Degeneration
- freedom of choice
