= Indian Kansas =

Indian Kansas in the early 19th century was the homeland of Native Americans (Indians) such as the Osage and Kaw tribes and nomadic Plains Indians such as the Comanche. In the first half of the century, more than a dozen tribes from the eastern United States were forced to migrate to Kansas, designated as "Indian Country." They were situated on reservations which were supposed to be their new and permanent homes, However, beginning in 1855, white settlers began to invade and occupy Indian lands and the government declined to evict them. In the late 1860s and early 1870s, the Indians and Indian tribes in Kansas were again forced to migrate to new reservations in Indian Territory (Oklahoma). A few Indians and Indian tribes avoided going to Oklahoma and continued to live in Kansas although they retained only a small percentage of their lands.

Today, four federally recognized tribes have reservations in Kansas. They are:

- Kickapoo Tribe of Indians of the Kickapoo Reservation in Kansas
- Iowa Tribe of Kansas and Nebraska
- Prairie Band of Potawatomi Nation
- Sac and Fox Nation of Missouri in Kansas and Nebraska

== Kansas in 1803 ==
White Plume, a Kaw chieftain

With the Louisiana Purchase in 1803, the United States acquired all of what became the state of Kansas. At the time, there were no European settlements in the state. Indian tribes resident in Kansas were the Comanche and their allies the Kiowa and the Plains Apache who probably numbered 20,000. Nomads, they lived in and roamed the southwestern part of the state, mostly south of the Arkansas River. The Kaw or Kansa, who numbered about 1,500 lived in a village near present day Manhattan. The Pawnee, probably numbering about 12,000 people, lived in agricultural villages in Nebraska but western Kansas was a hunting ground for them.The Osage, who perhaps numbered 12,000 in 1800, were resident in Missouri but controlled southeastern Kansas and were moving into Kansas.

== Emigrant Indians moving west ==
The expansion of American settlements westward from the east coast of the United States had a domino effect as tribes whose homeland was east of the Mississippi River were forced to move west. Even before the Louisiana Purchase a few Cherokee from the southern Appalachian Mountains and Shawnee and Delaware from Ohio had crossed the Mississippi River and were living in Arkansas and Missouri respectively.

In the early 1800s, the Indian tribes in Missouri and Arkansas who had moved west to escape white settlers encroaching upon the lands were now under increasing pressure from white settlers in their new homes. Cherokee and Shawnee leaders promoted the idea of a "union of tribes" to resist white pressures. The emigrant Indians also wished to unite to combat the powerful Osage who opposed their encroachment on Osage lands and hunting territory. Those dreams fell apart after Missouri governor William Clark (of Lewis and Clark fame) lost his bid for reelection in 1820. Clark believed that Indians who adopted Christianity and become farmers would be integrated into U.S. society and only recalcitrant Indians should be forced off the land. His policies were in tune with the U.S. official policy of gradual assimilation of the Indians. What followed Clark was "strident anti-Indian policy-makers" and "local politicians, emboldened by frontiersmen hungry for Indian lands."

By 1825, Henry Schoolcraft hypothesized that 1,383 Shawnee, 2,200 Kickapoo, and 1,800 Delaware were living in Arkansas and Missouri. Six thousand Cherokee were living in Arkansas. The Secretary of War John Calhoun estimated that 42,345 Indians were still resident in Indiana, Ohio, Illinois, and Michigan. Most of them would soon move west as would the Cherokee and other Indian tribes from the American south.

== "Indian country" ==
Indian country in 1836

President Thomas Jefferson initiated the removal policy of the U.S. government. In 1803, in a letter he proposed that Indians be encouraged to become indebted to government-supported traders to induce them to cede lands.

The first large step forward in the policy of removing eastern Indians to Kansas was treaties in 1825 with the Osage and the Kaw in which they ceded a large portion of their land in exchange for annuities. The treaties opened up most of eastern Kansas to Indian settlement. That same year in the Treaty of St. Louis a Shawnee band living in Missouri agreed to cede its lands and move to Kansas. They were the first eastern tribe to relocate to Kansas and were given a reservation that encompasses present-day Kansas City, Kansas.

Andrew Jackson was elected President of the United States in 1828. Jackson favored removal of all the Indians still living east of the Mississippi River plus the Indians living in Arkansas, Missouri, and Iowa. The Indian Removal Act of 1830 as adopted by Congress, provided "for an exchange of lands with the Indians residing in any of the states or territories, and for their removal west of the Mississippi River." The Act also guaranteed that the U.S. would protect the Indians from all persons and "forever secure...the country so exchanged with them."

The Nonintercourse Act of 1834 said the United States "west of the Mississippi, and not within the states of Missouri and Louisiana or the territory of Arkansas" was "Indian country." Kansas was thus in "Indian country." The remaining Indians in Missouri and east of the Mississippi River were to be relocated to Kansas and what would become Oklahoma. The northern Indians relocated to Kansas and the southern Indians relocated to Oklahoma. White settlers were prohibited from living in Kansas and Oklahoma. Only licensed traders, government agents, and people invited by the tribes were permitted to reside in Kansas.

The force motivating the American government and its citizens to force the Indians from their lands (guaranteed them by previous treaties) was the land hunger of the settlers in the rapidly-expanding white settlements. Some whites also advanced idealistic motives for the removal of the Indians from their eastern homes. The missionary, Isaac McCoy, for example, had the vision of an "Indian Canaan": the creation of an Indian state in which tribes could reside free from white interference. A Potawatomi leader expressed his willingness to move west because there would be a "fence" between the Indians and the whites. The "Indian Canaan" and the "fence" would prove to be of brief duration.

Some historians have also defended the forced migration of the Indian tribes to Kansas as necessary to prevent their extinction either by genocide or their assimilation into white culture. On their part, the Indians became willing to move west because they could not protect their lands against white encroachment and the U.S. government was unwilling to protect them from violence and displacement.

== The eastern Indians move west ==
In 1831, prior to the Nonintercourse Act of 1834, several treaties concluded with Indian tribes resident in the northern United States obligated the Indians to cede their lands and begin their movement toward Kansas where they would be given new reservations. The Kansas reservations were made up of lands ceded by the Osage and Kaw in the 1825 treaties. (The movement of southern Indian tribes to what became Oklahoma was also underway.) Tribes ceding land in 1832 were the Sac and Fox, Potawatomi, factions of the Shawnee and Delaware, Kaskaskia, Peoria, Piankashaw, Wea, and several small groups of Indians resident in New York. They were joined in Kansas later in the 1830s and in the 1840s by the Ottawa, Kickapoo, Miami, Chippewa, Otoe, Missouria, Iowa and Wyandot. Perhaps the Wyandot were the most acculturated of all the emigrant Indians. Numbering 643 persons, they moved west to Kansas from Ohio in 1843 after one of their leaders and his family were murdered by white settlers. Their leader in Kansas, William Walker, was elected provisional governor of Nebraska territory (which included Kansas) in 1853.

The experience of one Potowatomi group illustrates that the relocation was not voluntary. In Indiana, a Potawatomi band numbering 859 persons refused to give up their lands and move to Kansas. In 1838, the governor of Indiana authorized a militia of 100 men to force the Potawatomi to leave. Their property was destroyed; they were rounded up and escorted 660 miles (1,060 km) to Kansas. More than forty died during the journey, mostly children, due to difficult conditions.`A Roman Catholic priest accompanied them and called their journey the "trail of death."

All the reservations of the eastern Indians were in easternmost Kansas as western Kansas remained under the influence of hostile Plains Indian tribes until about 1870. Many members of eastern tribes, however, ventured west to hunt bison or to become fur trappers (mountain men), guides, or explorers.

== Living in Kansas ==
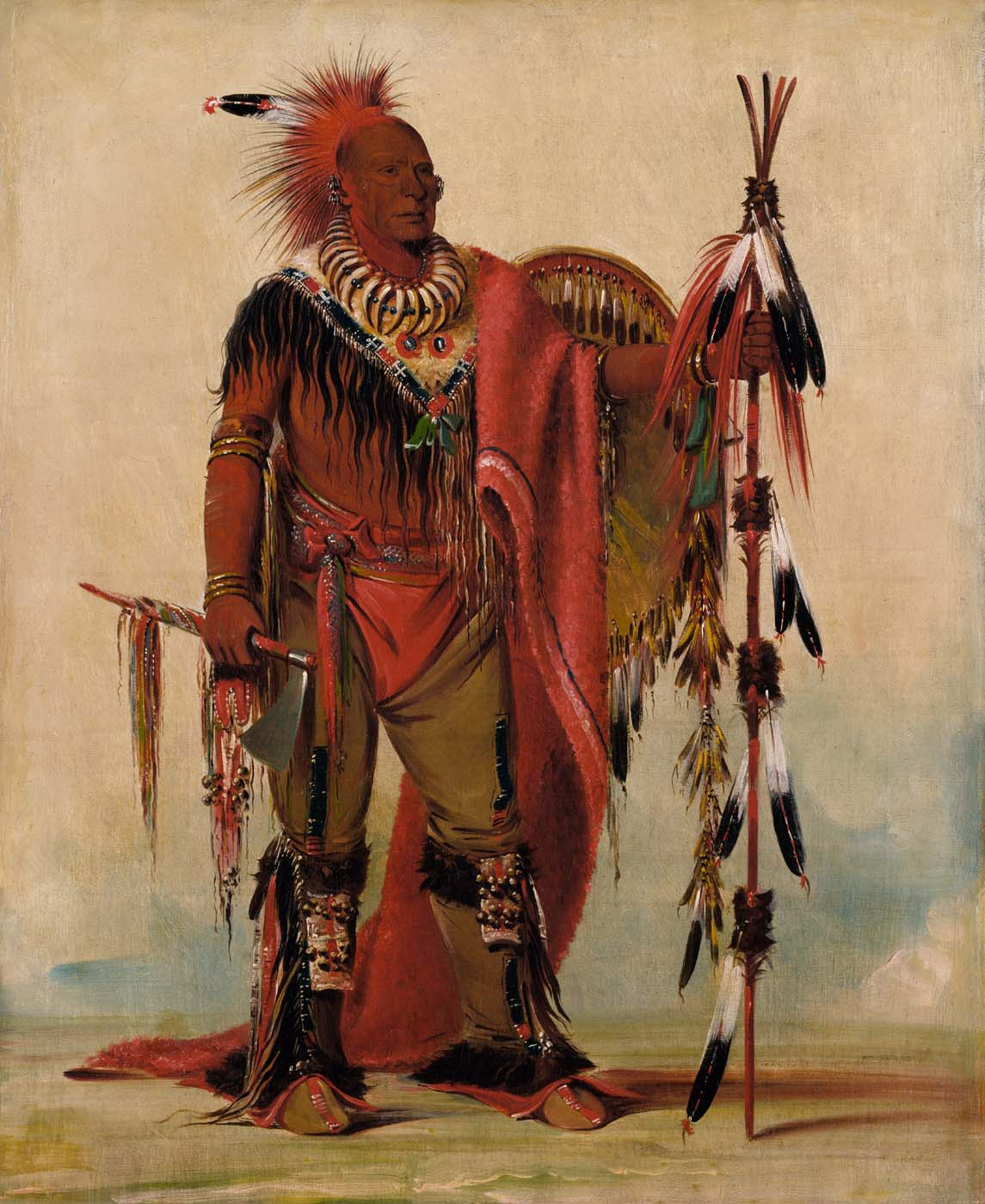
Keokuk, a Sac chieftain

Although white settlers were prohibited from residing in Kansas, thousands of white travelers criss-crossed Kansas annually on the Santa Fe and Oregon Trails. In 1846 a U.S. army enroute to war against Mexico marched across their land. The U.S. government established military forts to protect the commercial traffic along the trails from the sometimes hostile Comanche and the Cheyenne who arrived in Kansas from the north in the 1840s. Missionaries, traders, trappers, travelers, bootleggers and U.S. government agents lived among the Indians. As early as 1834, the Shawnee asked their government agent to expel white intruders and missionaries on their lands. The U.S. army declined to get involved. In 1846, the Kaw sold most of the reservation granted them in 1825 for a much smaller reservation near Council Grove The Kaws were in economic distress, indebted, and their environment and culture was disrupted by the travel of whites through their lands via the Santa Fe and Oregon trails.

Between 1830 and 1860, the Indian population in Kansas declined by one-half or more due to epidemics of smallpox and other diseases, alcoholism, and hardships. For example, the population of the Sac and Foxes declined from 6,500 in 1830 to just 1,280 in 1860. Political pressure steadily built to allow white settlement of Indian lands. The problems multiplied in 1854. Congress adopted the Kansas-Nebraska Act which opened up Kansas to white settlement, albeit only to non-Indian land. White settlers flooded into Kansas and from a few hundred whites in 1850 the population reached 107,000 in 1860. (The Indian population was not counted in the census.) Settlers routinely occupied Indian lands and the U.S. government made little or no effort to expel the intruders. The turmoil and violent confrontations between pro- and anti-slavery factions among white settlers in Kansas, called "Bleeding Kansas" caused chaos as did the Civil war (1861-1865) which followed.

The Osage were the most powerful tribe and owners of the largest reservation in Kansas. By the end of the Civil War in 1865, the Osage were destitute and much of their land was occupied by white settlers. In the Canville Treaty, the Osage ceded about one half of their 12,500 sq mi (32,000 km^{2}) reservation to the United States, receiving in turn a trust fund and the proceeds of land sales within their former reservation. The remaining one-half of their reservation was quickly occupied by white settlers.

== Expulsion ==
After the Civil War, the U.S. government began to force the Indians in Kansas to move to Oklahoma. With the approval of the Kansas state government all the Indian reservations had been overrun by white settlers. Starvation among Indians became common as they were cut off from land and livelihoods. In February 1870, the U.S Senate published a resolution of the Kansas legislature "in favor of the removal of all Indians who have not become citizens from the limits of that state to special reservations, and the extinguishment of their rights of possession to all lands within that state." (Until 1924, most Indians were not considered citizens because they were not taxed by the United States.)

More than 10,000 eastern Indians moved to Oklahoma by 1875 and fewer than 1,000 remained in Kansas. The indigenous (or nearly indigenous) Osage and Kaw also left Kansas for Oklahoma. The Plains Indians suffered a similar fate. In the Little Arkansas and Medicine Lodge Treaties the tribes frequenting western Kansas -- the Comanche, Kiowa, Plains Apache, Cheyenne, and Arapahoe -- were forced to give up any claims to land in Kansas and to move to reservations in Oklahoma.

== Enduring Indians ==
Pressure to move to Oklahoma notwithstanding, the following tribes and parts of tribes remained in Kansas: Prairie Potawatomi, Kickapoo, Chippewa, Munsee, Iowas, and Sacs. Each of them have their own reasons and history for remaining in Kansas.

In the late 19th and early 20th century, the policy of the U.S. government toward Indian reservations was "allotment": to eliminate Indian reservations by dividing up what had been common land owned by tribes into 160-acre parcels to be owned by individual Indians. The stated objective was to achieve "a capitalist and proprietary relationship with property" that did not previously exist in Indian cultures. The results were "catastrophic." Indian land declared surplus (of which there was much) was sold to white settlers. Allotment also meant that land owned by individual Indians could be bought and sold. Whites took advantage of Indians who often did not understand the concept of private ownership nor the monetary value of land. By 1934, the Indian tribes had lost 60 percent of their land. Kansas tribes mostly resisted allotment, although it was forced upon them.

Most of the Kickapoo tribe migrated to Oklahoma or Mexico, but a few hundred including allied Potawatomi refused to leave Kansas. They retained only a small portion of their former lands in Brown County. Most of the Kickapoo refused to accept Christianity and allotment and continued to hold land in common for many years. At the same time they became excellent farmers and were accepted by their white neighbors. Author Herring cites a view that their combination of "civilization and barbarism" enabled them to survive into the 20th century.

On arrival in Kansas, the Sacs and the Iowas were the least acculturated to white society and the most resistant. Over time, they, like the Chippewa and Munsee, who numbered only forty each, adopted the outward manifestations of white culture as a means of survival in Kansas.

The Pottawatomi in Kansas split into two groups. The Citizen Band mostly left Kansas for Oklahoma; the Prairie Band remained in Kansas. the Prairie band was described by whites in the late 19th century as representing "superstitution, ignorance, and sloth" and taking "pleasure in antagonizing the government." Belying that opinion, the Prairie Potawatomi were prosperous farmers and the most successful Indian tribe in delaying allotment. In 1891, with the threat of violence, they refused for their lands to be alloted. The government called in the U.S. army and imprisoned their leaders. They still resisted and not until 1897 was their tribal land divided into individual plots.

Despite the loss of their communal lands in the late 19th century, tribal governments survived. In the 21st century, the U.S. government recognized four Indian tribes in Kansas: The Prairie Band Potawatomi Nation, the Kickapoo Tribe in Kansas, the Sac and Fox Nation of Missouri in Kansas and Nebraska, and the Iowa Tribe of Kansas and Nebraska.
