= Detribalization =

Process of disconnecting from indigenous ethnic practices and identity

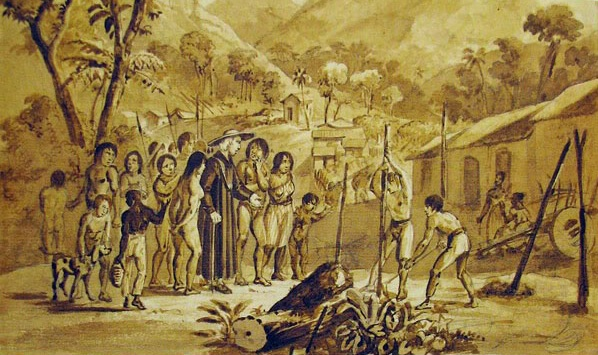
"Aldea des Tapuyos" or "Village of Tapuyos" ca. 1824. An image depicting a village of Indigenous people in Brazil referred to as "tapuyos," who have been described as a detribalized population.

Detribalization is the process by which persons who belong to a particular indigenous ethnic identity or community are detached from that identity or community through the deliberate efforts of colonizers and/or the larger effects of colonialism.

Detribalization was systematically executed by detaching members from communities outside the colony so that they could be "modernized", Westernized, and, in most circumstances, Christianized for the prosperity of the colonial state. Historical accounts illustrate several trends in detribalization, with the most prevalent being the role that Western colonial capitalists played in exploiting Indigenous people's labor, resources, and knowledge, the role that Christian missionaries and the colonial Christian mission system played in compelling Christian membership in place of Indigenous cultural and religious practices, instances of which were recorded in North America, South America, Africa, Asia, and Oceania, and the systemic conditioning of Indigenous peoples to internalize their own purported inferiority through direct and indirect methods.

In the colonial worldview, "civilization" was exhibited through the development of permanent settlements, infrastructure, lines of communication, churches, and a built environment based on the extraction of natural resources. Detribalization was usually explained as an effort to raise people up from what colonizers perceived as inferior and "uncivilized" ways of living and enacted by detaching Indigenous persons from their traditional territories, cultural practices, and communal identities. This often resulted in a marginal position within colonial society and exploitation within capitalist industry.

De-Indianization has been used in scholarship as a variant of detribalization, particularly on work in the United States and Latin American contexts. The term detribalization is similarly used to refer to this process of colonial transformation on subsets of the historical and contemporary Indigenous population of the Americas. De-Indianization has been defined by anthropologist Guillermo Bonfil Batalla as a process which occurs "in the realm of ideology" or identity, and is fulfilled when "the pressures of the dominant society succeed in breaking the ethnic identity of the Indian community," even if "the lifeway may continue much as before." De-Indigenization or deindigenization have also been used as variants of detribalization in academic scholarship. For example, academic Patrisia Gonzales has argued how mestizaje operated as the "master narrative" constructed by colonizers "to de-Indigenize peoples" throughout Latin America.

While, according to James F. Eder, initial colonial detribalization most often occurred as a result of "land expropriation, habitat destruction, epidemic disease, or even genocide," contemporary cases may not involve such apparent or "readily identified external factors." In a postcolonial framework, "less visible forces associated with political economies of modern nation-states – market incentives, cultural pressures, new religious ideologies – permeate the fabric and ethos of tribal societies and motivate their members to think and behave in new ways."

== Usage of term ==
Detribalize has been defined by Merriam-Webster as "to cause losing tribal identity," by Dictionary.com as "to cause losing tribal allegiances and customs, chiefly through contact with another culture," and by the Cambridge Dictionary as "to make members of a tribe (a social group of people with the same language, customs, and history, and often a recognized leader) stop following their traditional customs or social structure." Detribalization incorporates the word tribal, which has been recognized as an offensive and pejorative term when used in certain contexts. For this reason, detribalization is sometimes used in quotations when referring to the process being described as a signal to the reader of the term's potentially offensive subtext.

From its early uses to modern scholarship, detribalization has almost exclusively been applied in particular geographic, and therefore racialized, contexts. As the proceeding section on regional detribalized histories demonstrates, while historical discussion and academic research on "detribalization" and "detribalized" peoples can be found in the African, Asian, Oceanic, North American, and South American contexts, especially when referring to Indigenous histories of each of these regions, to locate instances in which the term has been applied to Europeans or in the European context is exceptionally rare. One of the few instances was by contemporary scholar Ronen Zeidel in a study on Iraqi Gypsies in 2014, who stated "whereas the Gypsies entered a detribalized Europe with a social organization that was different, contributing to their estrangement, that was not the case in Iraq. Iraqi society has never been detribalized."

=== Misapplication ===
In the twentieth century, criticisms regarding the usage of detribalization emerged among scholars, particularly in the African context, who recognized its misapplication as a consequence of racism. South African anthropologist Meyer Fortes noted how the term was commonly used in the European sociological context as a "synonym for such words as 'pathological', 'disintegrated', 'demoralized', in a pejorative or deprecatory sense." Isaac Schapera recognized that the term was being misapplied by Europeans who assumed that urbanization in colonial society implied detribalization: "it is not correct to assume that all people who go to the Union [of South Africa] from Bechuanaland tend to become 'detribalized'." H. M. Robertson states that "the urban native is classed as 'detribalized,' but this is not necessarily the case." Ellen Hellmann similarly described in her sociological work "that 'the process of detribalization has been exaggerated' among the urban African population, although 'the average European would unhesitatingly classify these Natives as detribalized'." In his sociological study, William Watson concludes that while "under urban conditions, Africans rapidly assimilate European dress, material culture, and outward forms of behaviour, this assimilation does not necessarily imply detribalization. On the contrary, many attempts to organize African industrial workers on a common basis of economic interest have encountered great difficulties because of African tribal solidarity and intertribal hostilities."

In Africa's International Relations: The Diplomacy of Dependency and Change (1978), Kenyan academic Ali A Mazrui provides a nuanced discussion of the misapplication of detribalization, recognizing how "there was often an assumption among analysts of the African colonial scene that nationalism made its recruits from the ranks of the detribalized." Since the leaders of anti-colonial movements were, in the majority of instances, "Westernized or semi-Westernized," they were classed as "detribalized" by European colonial authorities. However, Mazrui notes that this employment of detribalization failed to differentiate between "tribalism as a way of life and tribalism as loyalty to an ethnic group," noting that colonial analysts had only recognized instances of a "weakening of cultural affiliation, though not necessarily of ethnic loyalty." In other words, "a person could adopt an entirely Western way of life but still retain great love and loyalty to the ethnic group from which he sprang." As a result, Mazrui proposes the term detraditionalized, recognizing that "the erosion of tradition [does] not necessarily mean the diminution of ethnicity."

== Regional detribalized histories ==
=== In Africa ===
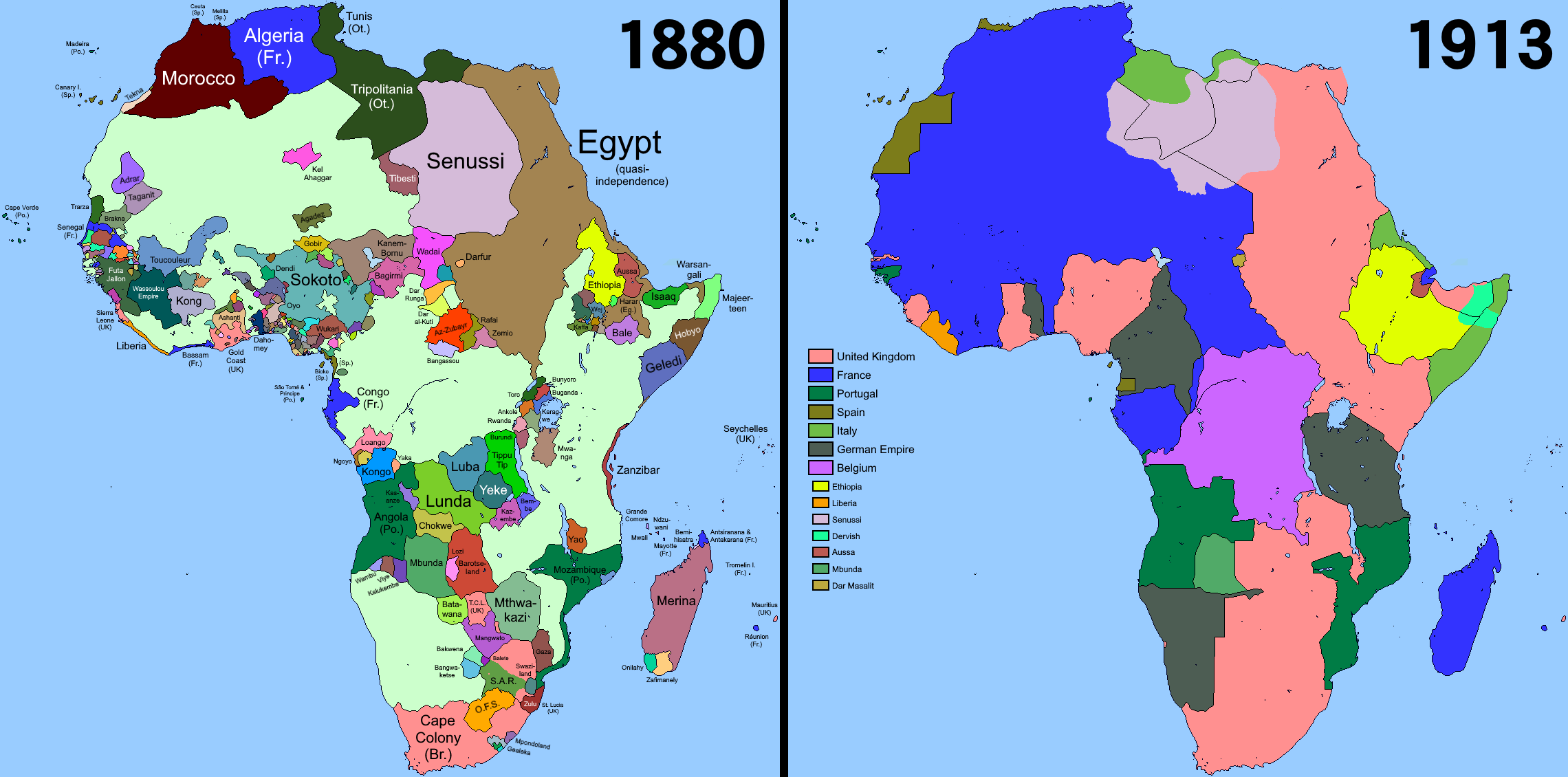
Comparison of Africa in the years 1880 and 1913

From 1884 to 1885, European powers, along with the United States, convened at the Berlin Conference in order to settle colonial disputes throughout the African continent and protect the economic interests of their colonial empires. The conference was the primary occasion for partitioning, what Europeans commonly referred to as, "the dark continent", and came about as a result of conflicting territorial claims. The various European colonial powers wish to avoid conflict in their "Scramble for Africa", and as such drew clear lines over the continent. In 1898, Polish-British author Joseph Conrad remarked in Heart of Darkness on how Europeans used color swatches to denote their territorial claims over Africa, a common practice in the period:

There was a vast amount of red [Britain] – good to see at any time, because one knows that some real work is done there, a deuce of a lot of blue [France], a little green [Portugal], smears of orange, and, on the East Coast, a purple patch [Germany], to show where the jolly pioneers drink the jolly lager beer. However, I wasn't going into any of these. I was going into the yellow [Belgium]. Dead in the center.

An empire had to demonstrate effective occupation of the land they were claiming in order to justify their claims to it. Under these guidelines, scholar Kitty Millet has noted, that effective "'connoted farms, gardens, roads, railways, [and] even [a] postal service." The only entities which could claim ownership "over these diverse African spaces... had to be one of the powers at the conference. Local or Indigenous groups were neither imaginable as political powers nor visible as peers or subjects of European sovereigns." Not only were Indigenous peoples not physically represented at the Berlin Conference, they were also absent "to the European powers' conceptualization of territory. They were not 'on the map'." Rather, Indigenous peoples were perceived by Europeans as property of the land living in an inferior state of nature. Prior to their consciousness of their own "whiteness," Millet notes that Europeans were first "conscious of the superiority of their developmental 'progress' ... 'Savages' had temporary huts; they roamed the countryside. They were incapable of using nature appropriately. The colour of their skins condemned them."

Because Indigenous nations were deemed to be "uncivilized," European powers declared the territorial sovereignty of Africa as openly available, which initiated the Scramble for Africa in the late nineteenth century. With the continent of Africa conceptualized as effectively "ownerless" territory, Europeans positioned themselves as its redeemers and rightful colonial rulers. In the European colonial mindset, Africans were inferior and incapable of being "civilized" because they had failed to properly manage or exploit the natural resources available to them. As a result, they were deemed to be obstacles to capitalist investment, extraction, and production of natural resources in the construction of a new colonial empire and built environment. The immense diversity of the indigenous peoples of Africa was flattened by this colonial perception, which labeled them instead as an "unrepresentable nomadic horde of apprehensions that ran across European territories."

European colonial authorities, who policed and controlled the majority of territory in Africa by the early twentieth century (with the exception of Ethiopia and Liberia), were notably ambivalent towards "modernizing" African people. Donald Cameron, the governor of the colony of Tanganyika as well as, later, of Nigeria, said in 1925: "It is our duty to do everything in our power to develop the native on lines which will not Westernize him and turn him into a bad imitation of a European." Instead, Cameron argued that "the task of 'native administration' was to make him into a 'good African.'" While the French openly professed that their involvement in Africa was a "civilizing mission," scholar Peter A. Blitstein notes that in practice they rejected African "assimilation into French culture," excluded them "from French citizenship," and emphasized "how different Africans were from French, and how important it was to keep the two races separate." Mahmood Mamdani has contended that rather than a "civilizing mission," as was often claimed by European powers to be the rationale for colonization, colonial policy instead sought to "'stabilize racial domination by 'ground[ing] it in a politically enforced system of ethnic pluralism.'"

In the twentieth century, colonial authorities in Africa intentionally and actively worked to prevent the emergence of nationalist and working-class movements which could ultimately threaten their authority and colonial rule. They sought to prevent "detribalization," which Europeans interpreted as occurring through the urbanization, liberal education, and proletarianization of African people, regardless of whether they were detached from their ethnic identity or community or not. European powers adopted a policy of indirect rule, which (1) relied on the use of "traditional" African leadership to maintain order, which was also understood by Europeans, according to historian Leroy Vail, to be "markedly less expensive than the employment of expensive European officials," and (2) was rooted in the belief that "Africans were naturally 'tribal' people." As a result, "detribalization was the ghost which haunted the system" of indirect rule by threatening to undermine colonial capitalist hegemony in Africa. European perspectives of Africans were thoroughly infused with racism, which, according to John E. Flint, "served to justify European power over the 'native' and to keep western-educated Africans from contaminating the rest". Additionally, Alice Conklin has found that, in the post-World War I period, some officials in French West Africa may have "discovered in 'primitive' Africa an idealized premodern and patriarchal world reminiscent of the one they had lost at Verdun", a paternalistic position which nonetheless may have served as a rationale for fears over detribalization and the "consequences of modernity."

Under indirect rule, universal primary and secondary education were not adopted in European colonies in Africa in order to avoid creating a class of "unemployable and politically dangerous, 'pseudo-Europeanized' natives." A curriculum that instead directed Africans towards fulfilling subservient roles which Europeans perceived them as "destined" to play, commonly as members of the colonial peasantry and exploited laborers, was alternatively adopted. European fears over detribalization were also demonstrated via their attitudes toward the notion of African wage labor and proletarianization. For this reason, African wage labor was only determined necessary when it aided the advancement or progress of the colonial capitalist state, such as via the African colonial mining industry. According to Peter A. Blitstein, not a single European colonial power were "able to see wage workers as anything but 'detribalized' and, therefore, dangerous." As a result, the ideal model for African colonial society was one in which small-scale producers could be provided with temporary migrant labor as needed, since "to recognize Africans as workers would ultimately equate them to Europeans, and, perhaps, require the kinds of welfare-state provisions that European workers were beginning to enjoy – trade union membership, insurance, a family wage."

During World War II, a study authored by four colonial functionaries and commissioned by the Vichy French government's ministry of the colonies in 1944 entitled "Condition of the detribalized natives" called for "the systematic and immediate expulsion of any native illegally entering metropolitan France." Historian Eric T. Jennings has commented how this policy was "certainly not new" and had been informed by "a host of reductionist thinkers from Gustave Le Bon to Edouard Drumont or Alexis Carrel", while also eerily foreshadowing arguments to be used by the modern French far right. Jean Paillard, an influential colonial theorist in Vichy France, feared "native domination" in which "the colonizers would eventually come under the domination of the colonized." Similarly, the authors of the study maintained that "the detribalized native becomes an immoral creature as soon as he reaches the city," reiterating European colonial viewpoints in the twentieth century by emphasizing that "detribalization" must be avoided above all measures. However, when detribalization becomes "unavoidable", it must "be accompanied by a strict regimen" of control. According to the study, when "left to their own devices," the "detribalized" persons become drunken failures in European society due to their innate inferiority. Jennings argues that this study attempted to invent a "retribalization" effort for the "detribalized" person and was hinged upon the larger "apocalyptic fears of a world dominated by unruly and debauched 'natives,' uprooted from their 'natural environments.'" This study reflected much of the European theoretical perception of detribalized peoples of the period, as further exemplified in Maurice Barrès's Uprooted (1941).

Following the end of the Second World War, colonial policy began to shift from preventing "detribalization" to more widely promoting devices for economic and cultural development in African colonial societies. In the case of European colonial governments, they began to promote self-government as a means of obtaining independence. European colonial empires in Africa increasingly opted for nationalization rather than previous policies of indirect rule and forced contracted or temporary labor. However, according to historian Peter A. Blitstein, the ultimate objectives of the European colonial powers for Westernizing colonized and "detribalized" Africans remained unclear by the mid-twentieth century, as colonizers struggled to articulate how Africans could be brought into congruence with their visions of "modernity."

Throughout post-independence Africa, two different types of African states emerged, according to scholar Mahmood Mamdani, which he terms as "the conservative and the radical" African states. While the conservative African state adopted a decentralized form of despotic authority that "tended to bridge the urban-rural divide through a clientelism whose effect was to exacerbate ethnic divisions," the radical African state adopted a centralized form of despotic authority that contributed to detribalization by tightening control over local authorities. Mamdani theorizes that "if the two-pronged division that the colonial state enforced on the colonized – between town and country, and between ethnicities – was its dual legacy at independence, each of the two versions of the postcolonial state tended to soften one part of the legacy while exacerbating the other."

==== Southern Africa ====
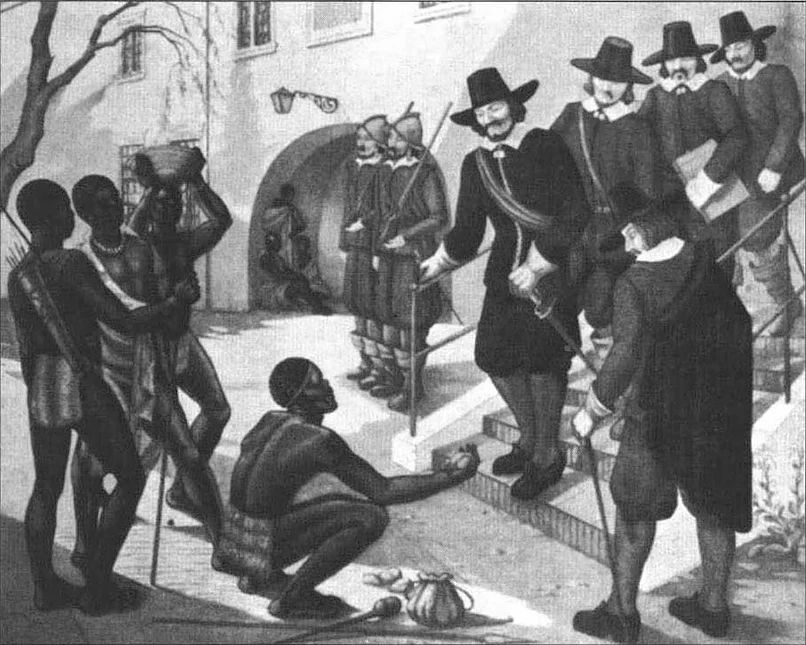
Undated anonymous mural located in South Africa House, London, portraying the Nama presenting green copper-bearing rocks to the Dutch East India Company at the Cape, which initiated an expedition to extract the ore by the Dutch in 1685.

In the seventeenth century, the Dutch East India Company was importing shiploads of slaves to South Africa, transferring the former colonial station for passing ships into a slaveholding colony. In 1685, the Cape Colony's last company commander and first governor, Simon van der Stel, formed an exploration party to locate a copper reserve that the Indigenous Nama people had shown him. The Nama were reportedly described by the colonists as "'very friendly'" and scholar Kitty Millet notes that, "relations were so amenable between the Nama and the Dutch settlers that the Nama treated the colony to a musical 'exhibition' for the governor's birthday." However, shortly after Dutch settlers introduced slave labor to the region and arrived in increasingly greater numbers, conflicts from 1659 to 1660 and 1673 to 1677, followed by a smallpox outbreak, caused the majority of the Nama to flee from their traditional territory. Those who remained soon "existed as 'detribalized indigenous peoples'."

Early maps created by European colonizers portrayed an image of southern Africa as a terra nullius of "uncivilized" Indigenous villages and "wild beasts." As early as the 1760s, Europeans sought to organize Nama settlements in the region into "'natural' preserves" that would enable segregation of colonists from Indigenous peoples. When the British first took over the colony in 1798, John Barrow, a British statesman, perceived himself as "a reformer in comparison with the Boer [Dutch] 'burghers' and government officials whose embrace of slavery, and land grabs, had destroyed not only Nama tribes living near them, but also the land itself on which they staked their farms." The Nama tribes on the Namaqua plain had been absorbed into the South African colony as "individual units of labour" and reportedly lived "in a state of 'detribalization.'" As the Nama were increasingly exploited and brought into subservience to Europeans, many completely abandoned the territory of the expanding Cape Colony, choosing instead to settle along the Orange River. Many were also absorbed into Oorlam communities, where "they existed as herders and 'outlaws,' conducting raids on Boer farms."

From 1800 to 1925, approximately 60 missionary societies from Europe established more than 1,030 mission stations throughout southern Africa. A study on the location and role of these mission stations by Franco Frescura noted how throughout the nineteenth century, there was a "spreading geographical presence of missionaries over southern Africa", which paralleled the restructuring of the social, economic, and political landscape of the region by colonial forces. Despite their stated purpose, missionaries were reportedly unsuccessful in converting many Indigenous people to Christianity. One study reported that only about "12% of people on mission settlements were there for spiritual reasons" and that the majority of people often remained either for a "material advantage or psychological security." Throughout southern Africa, while "some groups such as the Basotho and the Tswana openly welcomed missionaries, others like the Pedi, the Zulu, and the Pondo vehemently rejected their presence as a matter of national policy." In some cases, entire populations relocated away from the mission settlements and ostracized members of their community who had been converted or resided at the settlements, effectively expelling them from their communities.

In 1806, German missionaries working under the London Missionary Society were reportedly the "first white persons" to arrive in what is now modern-day Namibia. They soon founded mission stations with surrounding fields and territories in an effort to Christianize and sedenteraize the Indigenous peoples. However, because of the harsh climate and severe drought, their attempts at maintaining the stations failed. They converted one Orlam kaptein, Jager Afrikaner, the father of Jonker Afrikaner, who would become an important Namibian politician. Missionaries struggled to indoctrinate the Indigenous peoples in the region with their ideologies due to outright opposition from the Herero, who were the most powerful Indigenous group and were unconvinced of the professed "holy mission" of the missionaries. European settlers considered the Herero, like other Indigenous people in the region, as "uncivilized" because they did not practice sedentary farming nor openly accept Western ideologies. A German missionary illuminated this wider perspective regarding his encounters with the Nama people: "The Nama does not want to work but to live a life of ease. But the Gospel says he must work in the sweat of his brows. He is therefore opposed to the Gospel." This was a common perception among missionaries in southern Africa, who "sought to impose an alien morality and work ethos upon the local people without realizing that these undermined their most basic social and cultural tenets and were therefore largely resisted."

The status of detribalization was perceived by Dutch colonizers as a potential method of redemption, as noted by scholar Kitty Millet, so that "the 'detribalized' African" could learn "his proper place" as a member of an exploited class of laborers fueling colonial industry. The Orlam people were understood as "detribalized Namas" who had now lived for several generations on the outskirts of colonial society as both indentured bonded servants and as enslaved people subjugated to a position of servitude to the Dutch settlers (also referred to as Boers). In the nineteenth century, as Millet reports, there was a "concerted effort" by the Dutch Cape Colony government to "detach individuals from the tribal group" of the Orlam, "to 'detribalize' them through labor, either through indenture or enslavement." In order to maintain the colonial capitalist order, the Dutch "not only wanted to destroy the physical polities of indigenous tribes among or in proximity to them, substituting them with a docile class of labourers, but also wanted them to forget, completely, their prior existence as 'independent' peoples. The colony's 'health' depended on the removal of independent tribes and, in their stead, the visibility of the 'detribalized' servant."

In order to psychologically condition Orlam people to accept a subordinate role, the Dutch deliberately infantilized enslaved peoples to reinforce their status as inferior. In this regard, even if a slave escaped captivity and joined "free" Orlam communities as a fugitive, "the slave brought with him the memory of this infantilization." This dehumanizing treatment collectively triggered widespread resistance to Dutch colonialism in Orlam communities, who formed an aware and active community in Cape Town by maintaining relationships with enslaved peoples who remained under Dutch control. This pushed Orlam communities further to the margins, especially as Dutch Boer farmers "annexed more land, and moved closer to the 'fringes'" as a response to the transference of colonial political power. This ongoing resistance within Orlam communities led to the formation of politically centralized leaders in the early nineteenth century, known as kapteins, who functioned as authorities in the community unlike in any traditional Nama society.

As the European colonists targeted Orlam kapteins, scholar Kitty Millet notes, "even more 'detribalized' individuals [joined] the 'fugitives' already established at the margins" of colonial society. However, either oblivious to or refusing to acknowledge their own role in generating this deeply entrenched resistance, European colonists credited Orlam resistance with what they perceived to be an "ontological predisposition" within the detribalized Orlam people, which allegedly reflected a "primitive 'state of being'." They presumed that the Orlam's reestablishment as communities at the fringes of colonial society was an expression of their inherent nomadic disposition. As resistance continued to the colonial order, more and more groups with "diverse origins" also joined Orlam collectives, despite being notably "unrelated to their kapteins." Despite the heterogeneity of the Orlam collectives, they were able to fight their own subjugation and reestablish themselves as an Indigenous polity.

Over time, the burgeoning numbers of resistance groups could not be sustained by the surrounding region of the Cape Colony because of low rainfall and drought. As resources depleted, detribalized Orlam resistance groups moved northward and eventually crossed the Orange River to reunite with the Nama. Each of the Orlam resistance groups requested permission from the Nama confederation and reentered Nama land between 1815 and 1851. As they reintegrated into the Nama community, the Orlam groups quickly transformed how the Nama perceived themselves and their relationships with the neighboring Herero, as well as with the colonial traders and missionaries who had accompanied the Orlam resistance groups in their reintegration. As a result of this reintegration, Kitty Millet notes that a new Nama leadership emerged under Kido Witbooi's grandson, Hendrik Witbooi. Witbooi was a Christian who understood his leadership as a divine mandate. While traditional Nama tribes had preferred pacifism to armed conflict prior to the integration of the detribalized Orlam groups, Witbooi altered this understanding and believed it was his mission to continue the resistance effort among the Nama. Hendrik Witbooi was killed in battle with German colonial military forces in 1905 and is now understood to be a national hero in Namibia.

German South West Africa was established in 1884 following decades of German settlers and missionaries occupying the region and conducting work through missionary societies such as the Rhenish Missionary Society. The German Empire officially claimed dominion and sovereignty over present-day Namibia, which included the traditional territories of the Herero and Ovambo of the northern region, bands of Khoisan (San and Khoikhoi) in the central and southern regions, and the Damara in the mountainous regions. German colonists unilaterally applied the category of "bushmen" to these groups, because they perceived them as primitive "hunter-gatherers." Related to the Khoikhoi were the Nama, who by the nineteenth century had settled in the southwestern regions of Namibia and northern South Africa as a result of colonial displacement. White colonists living in the Cape Colony similarly referred to Khoisan and Nama as "Hottentots," a collective name originally coined by the German settlers in South West Africa. These labels demonstrated the European colonial perspective of Indigenous peoples, which flattened their complexities into a singular class of uniform colonized subjects.

In the nineteenth century, European missionaries sought to eradicate Indigenous ways of living and knowing through the process of Christianization to, as scholar Jason Hickel argues, mold them into "the bourgeois European model." As colonial German academic and theologian Gustav Warneck stated in 1888, "without doubt it is a far more costly thing to kill the [Indigenous population] than to Christianise them." Contrary to the stated "civilizing" objectives of missionaries, colonial administrators sought to preserve "traditional" African structures in order to maintain their indirect rule, consistently pushing Africans to the margins of colonial society. According to Hickel, administrators even regarded "the idea of a civilizing mission with suspicion, fearing that 'detribalization' would lead to social anomie, mass unrest, and the rise of a politically conscious class that would eventually undermine minority rule altogether." The Native Affairs Department, established by Cecil Rhodes in 1894, sought to prop up African "tradition" for this reason:

The idea was to prevent urbanization by keeping Africans confined to native reserves, and to govern them according to a codified form of customary law through existing patriarchs and chiefs. Then, using an intricate network of influx controls, Africans were brought temporarily to the cities for work on fixed-term contracts, at the end of which they were expelled back to the reserves. The system was purposefully designed to prevent full proletarianization and forestall the rise of radical consciousness.

However, by the early twentieth century, as a result of the "insatiable appetite [of colonizers] for cheap labor," the previous colonial policy of indirect rule began to weaken considerably, which resulted in the emergence of numerous informal settlements on the peripheries of "white cities" in southern Africa. In response to the overwhelming "unauthorized" urbanization of Africans, European colonial administrators eventually adopted the moralizing approach of their missionary counterparts and sought to "reform" African shanties, which were regarded as undisciplined chaotic spaces that blurred the order of colonial society as a "social-evolutionary misfire." Social scientists of the period upheld this perspective and disseminated these ideas widely, as represented in their perceptions of the "detribalized" African subjects who they perceived as inhabiting these peripheral informal settlements.

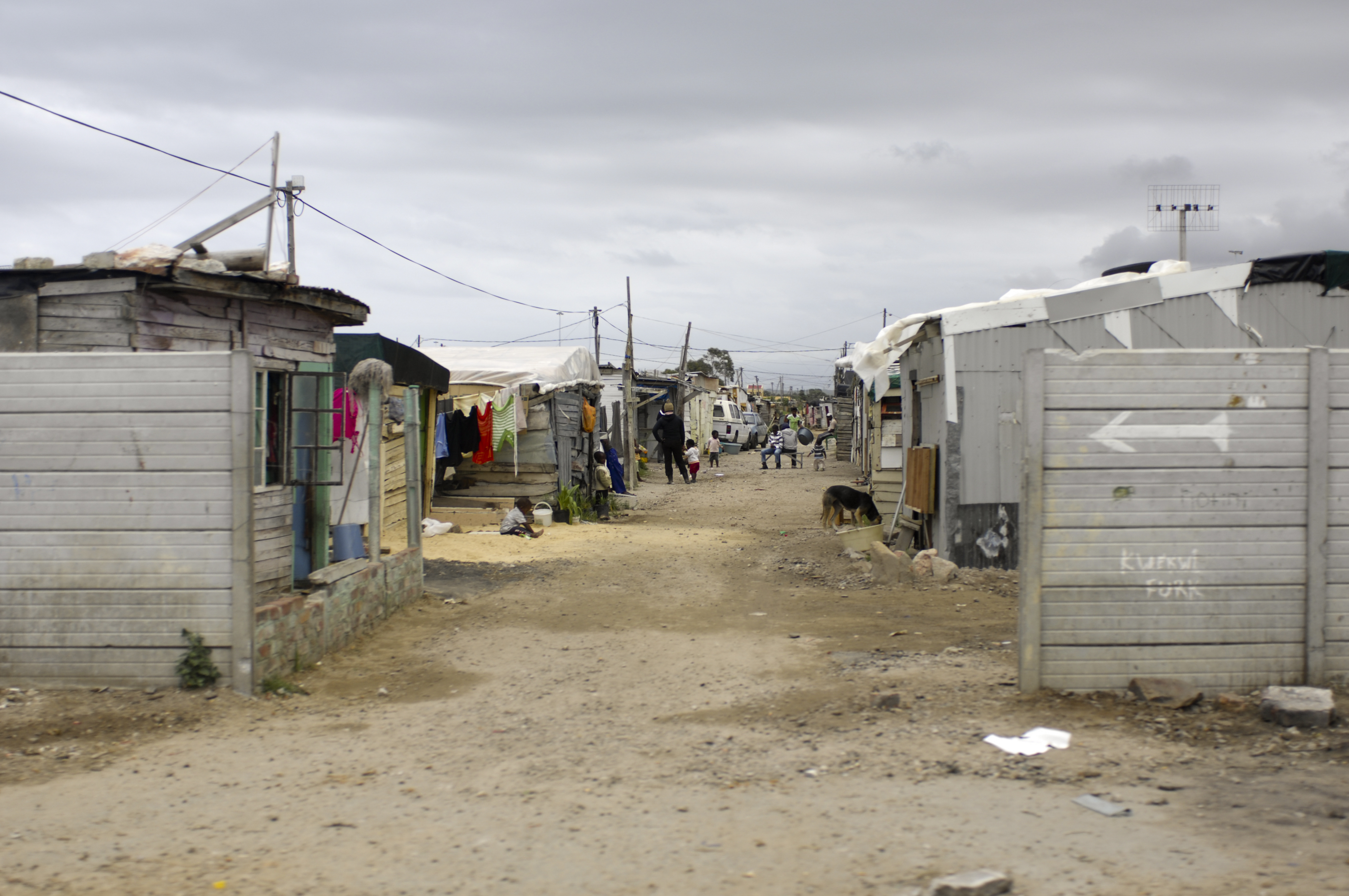
Zwelihle Township, in Hermanus, South Africa. ca. 2008

Austro-Hungarian philosopher Karl Polanyi referred to "detribalized" South Africans in highly racist and pathological terms, stating that the "kaffir of South Africa, a noble savage, whom none felt socially more secure in his native kraal, has been transformed into a human variety of half-domesticated animal dressed in the 'unrelated, the filthy, the unsightly rags that not the most degenerated white man would wear,' a nondescript being, without self-respect or standards, veritable human refuse." Anthropologist Bronislaw Malinowski similarly "decried 'detribalized' natives as 'sociologically unsound' monstrosities who had lost the regulated order of 'tribal' society – but given their lack of access to the necessary material resources – had failed to approximate the structure of 'European' society." The "out-of-category" status of "detribalized" urban South Africans was perceived as a threat to the European colonial order. In South Africa and Namibia, the colonial government soon "forced [their] relocations into modernist townships laid out along rectilinear grids" with the stated intention of conditioning "detribalized" Africans to become "happy, docile subjects" who would "internalize the values of European domesticity."

While Europeans and white South Africans during this period classed all urban Africans as "detribalized," this was largely an extension of existing racism which had flattened all Africans into indistinguishable masses of "disorderly" racialized subjects and was not necessarily reflective of reality. In fact, many Indigenous people working on European-owned farms and in urban districts were not formally "detribalized," or detached from their "tribal" identities or communities. Professor at Stellenbosch University J. F. W. Grosskopf recorded that "many Europeans coming into touch with the native only in the bigger centres seem inclined to over-estimate the number of 'detribalized' natives... Such natives may have adopted a semi-European urban mode of life for several years, while it still remains a difficult matter for the white man to say how far tribal influence and connection has actually ceased." In 1914, Grosskopf documented an instance in which several urbanized Black South Africans who had "never visited their tribe in Thaba Nehu" left their "permanent and well-paid jobs in Bloomfontein" after a Baralong chief "bought land for his followers in the southern part of Rhodesia." They recorded in a notice to their employers that they were leaving "'for our chief is calling us'." Anthropologist Isaac Schapera similarly noted that urbanization did not necessarily imply detribalization, essentially recognizing the differences between assimilation in Western society and detribalization.

Yet, with increasingly racist perceptions of Black South Africans, scholar Jason Hickel notes that "white South Africans saw detribalization as a process of decay, as the decomposition of tribal social order into a chaotic tangle of random persons and unmarried women." This was exemplified in their perceptions of townships, which were "regarded as makeshift and transient, in between the traditional African homestead and the modern European house." White South Africans adopted, what they considered to be, a "civilizing mission" with reluctance, conceding that "urban Africans" were "needed as labor" and "could [thus] not be 'retribalized.'" The first townships at Baumannville, Lamontville, and Chesterville were constructed in the 1930s and 1940s for this purpose. According to Hickel, the planners of these townships sought to "reconcile two competing ideas: on the one hand a fear that 'detribalization' of Africans would engender immense social upheaval, and, on the other hand, a belief that 'civilizing' Africans into an established set of social norms would facilitate docility." These conditions and perceptions continued throughout the apartheid era in South Africa and Namibia. South African political theorist Aletta Norval notes that as the apartheid system expanded, "the 'detribalized Native' had to be regarded as a 'visitor' in the cities until such time as the ideal of total apartheid could be reached" through complete racial segregation.

In Sounds of a Cowhide Drum (1971), Soweto poet Oswald Mbuyiseni Mtshali authored a poem entitled "The Detribalised" in which he described the consequences of detribalization and township life in South Africa. In a review of his work by Doreen Anderson Wood, she acknowledges how "sociologists and anthropologists have observed how detribalization and forcing mine workers into compound living [has] weakened family life in Africa, but few portray it with Mtshali's punch." Wood asserts that because they have been "denied admittance into full twentieth-century life[,] the detribalized fall into a vacuum of surface sophistication with no values underpinning it." Mtshali's poem encapsulates the experience of an unnamed man who was "born in Sophiatown, or Alexandra, I am not sure, but certainly not in Soweto." This "detribalized" man, in Mtshali's perspective, did not care for politics or concern himself with the imprisonment of anti-apartheid figures like Robert Sobukwe or Nelson Mandela on Robben Island, and was perhaps reflective, in Wood's words, of men who had been removed from the "stabilizing influences of tribal life" as a result of colonialism.

=== In the Americas ===
Regarding the greater Mesoamerican region, scholar Roberto Cintli Rodríguez describes how the Spanish inflicted two forms of colonization upon Indigenous peoples. While the first conquest refers to the military conquest campaigns under the authority of Hernán Cortés and other conquistadors, "La Otra Conquista [or the Other Conquest] included religiously motivated crusades to destroy all the temples, 'idols,' and books of Indigenous peoples." Coupled with centuries of violence, in which millions of Indigenous people were "devastated by war, mass killings, rape, enslavement, land theft, starvation, famine, and disease", the Other Conquest was simultaneously facilitated by the Spanish from the sixteenth to the nineteenth centuries with the central objective of destroying "maíz-based beliefs and cultures of Indigenous peoples, ushering in a radical shift in the axis mundi or center of the universe from maíz to the Christian cross," with the threat of death, torture, and eternal damnation for a refusal to conform to the colonial order. Rodríguez illuminates that although outright usage of force from the church has faded, official church messages in Latin America still continue to reinforce this practice today.

Spanish colonizers established a system of "congregaciones (the congregation of peoples) and the project of reducciones (spiritual 'reductions')" in an effort "to corrall Indians into missions or pueblos for the purpose of reducing or eliminating or 'killing' the souls of the Indians, creating Christians in their place." This method of "spiritually reducing Indians also served to facilitate land theft", and was first implemented in 1546, only to be reaffirmed numerous times throughout the colonial period. In 1681, as part of the Laws of the Indies, issued by the Spanish Crown for the American and the Philippine possessions of its empire, "continued the reduction of the Indians (their instruction in the Holy Faith) 'so that they could forget the errors of their ancient rites and ceremonies'." The reduction policies instituted by the Spanish colonizers "included the systemic demonization by Spanish friars of virtually all things Indigenous, particularly the people themselves, unless saved or baptized."

The "official Spanish practice regarding what language, indigenous or Castilian, should be employed in the evangelization effort [throughout New Spain] was often confused." The "colonial aim" was to Hispanicize the Indigenous people and to forcibly separate them from identifying with their cultural practices; "church and state officials intermittently used various decrees reiterating the official position and requiring that the Indians systematically be taught Spanish," such as one issued by the archbishop in Mexico City in 1717. At the same time, because many missionaries were "more interested in trying to impart what they considered the basis of their faith to the native peoples as quickly as possible" through Christianization, this led many to "acquire the rudiments of the indigenous languages" for the purposes of indoctrinating Indigenous people to become Christians.

==== Brazil ====
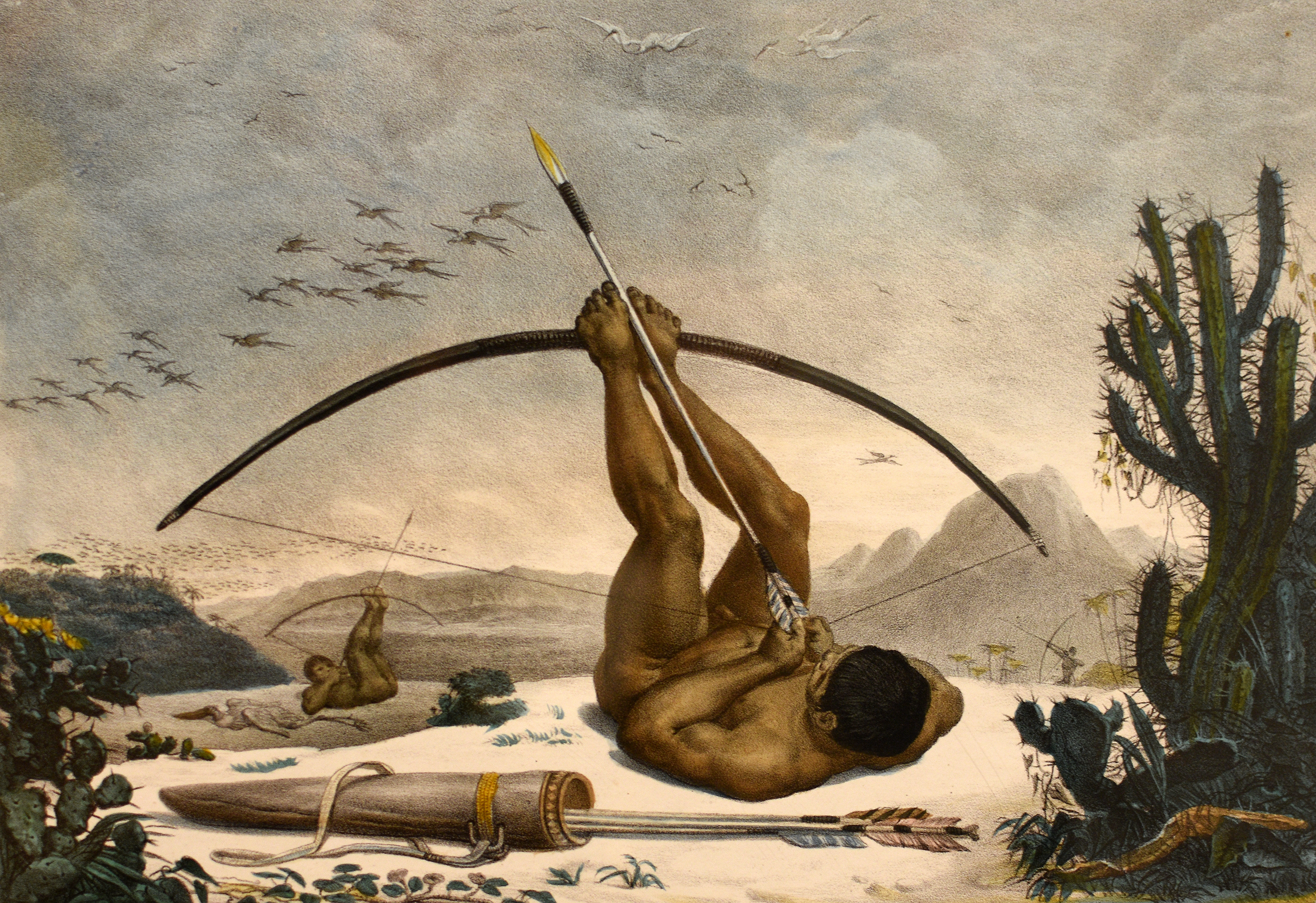
"Caboclo" by Jean-Baptiste Debret ca. 1834. "Caboclo" is a derogatory term meant to denote "civilized Indians" — a generic name that was given to detribalized baptized Indigenous people. It has also been used to mean "half-breed" or "of mixed blood."

Portuguese colonizers arrived on the eastern seaboard of South America in 1500 and had established permanent settlements in the interior regions of Amazonia a century later. Expeditions into the interior were carried out by Portuguese bandeirantes, who often "depended on Amerindians as rowers, collectors, and guides." Bandeirantes frequently turned these exploratory crusades "into slaving expeditions" through abducting, detaining, and exploiting the indigenous peoples of Brazil. The expeditions also carried "European diseases and death far into the interior" of the region. In 1645, Jesuit priests under the leadership of António Vieira "began establishing missions along the major Amazon River tributaries," which forcibly relocated large subsets of the Indigenous population into new colonial settlements:

Amerindian groups were relocated into large settlements, called aldeias, where their daily activities could be closely supervised, their souls could be saved, and their labor could be put to new tasks, such as raising cattle. In the aldeias, natives were deprived of their tribal identity under the homogenizing influence of the missionaries. Compelled to communicate with whites and other natives in the lingua geral, tribal Amerindians were gradually transformed into 'generic Indians' or tapuios.

The term tapuio "originally meant 'slave'", though soon afterward referred to detribalized and Christianized indigenous people who had assimilated into "colonial society", defined as such by their place of residence and proximity to colonial society. It has been used interchangeably with caboclo, recognized as a derogatory term "equivalent to half-breed" or "of mixed blood", as well as carijó, which also referred to "detribalized Indians". These labels differed from gentio, a similarly derogatory term which referred to unconverted and non-assimilated Indigenous people. Slave expeditions by the bandeirantes continued throughout the eighteenth century with the intention of stealing precious metals, especially gold, from the interior, which further led to "the acquisition of land grants, official appointments, and other rewards and honors" for white male settlers. At the same time, "Indians seized in confrontations with colonists were used as mining, agricultural, and domestic laborers", while others, and especially Indigenous women, faced rape and sexual assault.

While the expanding network of Jesuit missions "provided a measure of protection from the slavers who made annual expeditions into the interior," they simultaneously altered "the mental and material bases of Amerindian culture forever." While tapuios were "nominally free" (or free in name) at the missions, they were actually "obliged to provide labor to royal authorities and to colonists, a practice that frequently deteriorated into forced work hardly distinguishable from outright slavery." The aldeias also proliferated the "spread of European diseases, such as whooping cough, influenza, and smallpox, against which native populations had no immunity," which "killed tens of thousands of Amerindians" and pressured others to retreat deeper into the interior.

Jesuit priests, who by the mid-eighteenth century controlled "some twelve thousand Amerindians in sixty-three Amazonian missions," were expelled from Brazil in 1759. This increased opportunities for the enslavement, murder, and displacement of Indigenous people by "colonial authorities, landowners, and merchants," which had already been ongoing. While in the mid-seventeenth century "the Amazonian population was mainly indigenous except in the urban centers... by the middle of the eighteenth century, except for native groups that fled to remote refuge areas, the region's population consisted mostly of detribalized, subjugated tapuios" who were inserted "into a civilized, Catholic world under the auspices of their masters, resulting in the indiscriminate appropriation of native labor." The detribalized population of Indigenous people "were survivors or captives of raids" for over a century and "now lived in Mineiro towns and other localities under the tutelage of colonists." They were "detribalized for diverse reasons, of various ethnic and/or geographic origins, brought to live in or born into colonial society and thereby incorporated in the social and cultural life of Minas Gerais during the eighteenth century."

New legislation in the 1750s, sought to affirm "the freedom of Brazil's Indians," which was articulated "in a series of royal laws." This was only extended to Indigenous people who had been Christianized and somewhat assimilated: "once the state 'conveyed the law of God to the barbarous nations, reducing them to the Catholic faith and to the true knowledge of His Holy Name'." However, it "provided a mechanism by which Indians who migrated to towns and villages could defy colonists' attempts to keep them in bondage." A key aspect of this was "proving their Indigenous ancestry," which many detribalized people found difficult. At the same time, "administrators sought to conceal the ethnic origin of these Indians, labeling them with names that corresponded with generic mixed-race categories like caboclo (detribalized Indian rustic), curiboca (Afro-native mestizo), and cabra de terra ('goat'; i.e. mestizo of this land), among many others."

By thus engendering the “invisibility” of these peoples, they created a loophole in royal legislation, since the crown did not prohibit the captivity of mestiços whose racial mixture derived in part from enslaved mothers of African descent. With this tactic, they legitimized indigenous slavery. Had it not been for the insistence of colonial Indians, resolute in setting the justice system in motion in order to guarantee the recognition of their indigenous origins, these individuals surely would have remained enslaved... That said, attempts to turn Indians back into slaves were not uncommon, and many Indians failed to evade the schemes of the most stubborn colonists.

While revolts by detribalized Indigenous people were common, following the relocation of the Portuguese Crown to Brazil in 1808, "mission villages were destroyed, their resources seized, and inhabitants [were] pressed into forced labor." As the size of the white population reportedly grew, "a new wave of military action" was carried out against "remaining tribal groups." Once forcibly congregated into centralized colonial settlements, by the turn of the nineteenth century, detribalized Indigenous people "became scattered along the rivers, streams, and lakes of the Amazon basin where they lived primarily in small family groups" and developed sustenance strategies which "drew heavily from the indigenous groups from whom they were descended." However, while "preconquest Amerindian populations labored only for subsistence and occasional trade with neighboring tribes, the Jesuits taught the tapuios to produce commodities," which continued to link them into the global market by way of river traders, who "would deliver the goods to distant world markets." Many tapuios or caboclos inhabited "the same flood plains from which their ancestors had been displaced by the Portuguese" while culturally intact and "remaining Indian groups [had] confined themselves largely to managing inaccessible upland areas."

In 1822, as Brazil declared independence from Portuguese colonial rule, Amazonia was integrated into the newly unstable Brazilian state. Political tensions erupted into full-scale rebellions, the largest of which was the Cabanagem revolt in Pará, in which "rebels turned with a vengeance on their landlords and patrons," resulting in an estimated death rate of at least thirty thousand, or one quarter of the province's population. Tapuios had been continually exploited as a "great reserve labor force in Amazonia" and "as such played an important role" in the revolt. Many tapuios as well as "black slaves, and other workers fled" following the revolt "because they were cabanos [rebels] or to escape forced labor." Prior to the revolt, detribalized people had been "transformed into a dispersed propertyless mass alienated both from the intact, isolated tribal groups of the interior and from the rural white population." European ethnographers documented the effects of detribalization on the tapuios, who cited their poor treatment and lack of belonging as socially and psychologically damaging. Occupying an "ambiguous" social category between intact tribal groups and the white population, the "claims and interests" of the tapuios could not be effectively addressed by the Brazilian state, meaning they were faced with immediate "extermination or integration. Between these two alternatives there could exist no gray area questioning the value of assimilation into white society."

The exploitation of the tapuios was documented in travel journals of European and American colonizers in the mid-nineteenth century. In Exploration of the Valley of the Amazon by US Navy lieutenants William Lewis Herndon and Lardner Gibbon, tapuios are referred to as "peons" and were described in 1849, along with "negroes" and "mestizos" by the President of the province of Pará, Jeronimo Francisco Coelho, as "people void of civilization and education, and who exceeded in number the worthy, laborious, and industrious part of the population by more than three-quarters." Herndon and Gibbon affirmed that "a better description of the origin and character of these bodies of laborers cannot be given." These racist perceptions held by colonizers seemingly rationalized their right to exploit the labor of these groups, which was also entwined with Christianization and the role of the colonial church: "All the christianized Indians of the province of Pará are registered and compelled to serve the State, either as soldiers of the Guarda Policial or as a member of 'Bodies of Laborers,' distributed among the different territorial divisions of the province."

Regarding the Brazilian province of Amazonas, Herndon and Gibbon recorded that the Brazilian government continued to fear the power of the tapuios to revolt against "the foreigners," given their greater numbers as well as "the terrible revolution of the Cabanos (serfs, people who lived in cabins) in the years from 1836 to 1840, when many Portuguese were killed and expelled." As such, the President and government asserted "that laws must be made for the control and government of the sixty-thousand tapuios, who so far outnumbered the property-holders, and who are always open to the influence of the designing, the ambitious, and the wicked." The population of the province was recorded at "thirty thousand inhabitants – whites and civilized Indians," yet Herndon and Gibbon admitted that "no estimate can be made of the number of 'Gentios,' or savages." The American lieutenants expressed their support for further colonizing the region, even advocating for American slaveholders to do so:

I presume that the Brazilian government would impose no obstacles to the settlement of this country by any of the citizens of the United States who would choose to go there and carry their slaves; and I know that the thinking people on the Amazon would be glad to see them. The President, who is laboring for the good of the province, and sending for the chiefs of the Indian tribes for the purpose of engaging them in settlement and systematic labor, said to me, at parting 'How much I wish you could bring me a thousand of your active, industrious, and intelligent population, to set and example of labor to these people;' and others told me that they had no doubt that Brazil would give titles to vacant lands to as many as came.

==== Mexico ====
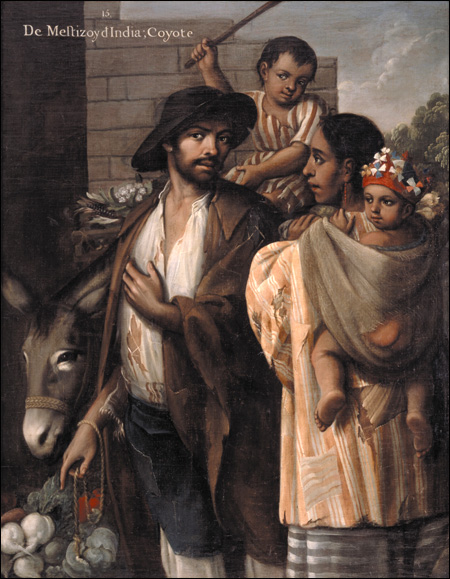
"De Mestizo y de India, Coyote" by Miguel Cabrera, ca. 1763. Painting depicts a group within the Spanish casta system, which organized people by racial classifications.

Mexican anthropologist Guillermo Bonfil Batalla and other scholars have used the term "de-Indianization" to describe a "historical process through which populations that originally possessed a particular and distinctive identity, based upon their own culture, are forced to renounce that identity, with all the consequent changes in their social organization and culture. The process of de-Indianization in Mexico was a colonial project which largely succeeded, according to Bonfil Batalla, "in convincing large parts of the Mesoamerican population to renounce their identification as members of a specific Indian collectivity." He acknowledges how many Indigenous peoples throughout Mexico were historically expelled or displaced from their traditional territories, while others may have been exterminated, "as was the case with the Great Chichimeca of the arid north." These genocidal conditions had the effect of detribalizing many Indigenous people by subjecting them to "conditions that made continuity as a culturally different people impossible." Although this process has been referred to as "mixture" or mestizaje under the colonial Mexican framework, "it really was, and is, ethnocide."

Christianization has been cited by scholars such as Patrisia Gonzales as an historically important element of the de-Indianization process in Mexico: "Spanish priests and authorities sought to spiritually subdue Mexico through de-Indianization, torture, and conversion." Indigenous "medicinal knowledge and communication with the natural world became supernatural and demonic" under the direct influence of the Mexican Inquisition. Indigenous women, and in particular midwives, were targeted by the Inquisition; "Europeans feared that women could control men, which contributed to many women being tried as witches in Europe." Female healers and midwives were identified by European men and the church as a threat to their power, both in Europe and in the Americas. In order to indoctrinate within Indigenous people the inferiority and "evil" nature of their own practices, the Inquisition "used repression of entire families and communities, torture, death, indentured servitude, and even prison" as well as "public displays of power to repress Indigenous worldviews." As this continued throughout Spanish colonial rule "over time, many Indigenous practices became associated with acts of the devil," which conditioned Mexican people to reject Indigenous ways of knowing. "Some Native leaders argue that such a conditioning occurs via sermons and faith activities," which continue today, and eventually led "to the de-Indianization of Mexicans."

In urban centers, spatial segregation between "Indians" and Spaniards, or peninsulares, was instituted by the colonial order, to separate the colonized from the colonizers. Because the colony of New Spain was "built upon the exploitation of the work force and the agricultural production of the Indians, particularly in the regions of Mesoamerica," it became "fundamental for the Colonial regime to define clear ethnic boundaries between Indians and non-Indians." However, the boundaries between the ethnic categories of the colonized in colonial Mexico were "relatively flexible in practice" as the colonial structure was primarily concentrated on maintaining the "hierarchical superiority of the Spaniards" above all else. There were important distinctions between "rich mestizos," who held structural power in Mexico historically and upheld the Westernization plan introduced by European invaders, from poor or working-class rural and urban mestizos.

In spite of the elaborate attempts to classify the castas and assign to each one [individual] a clear position in the stratified order of colonial society, those who were neither Spaniards (peninsulares or criollos) nor Indians never found precise placement in a society that rested on the rigid dual order of colonized and colonizers. Even though the castas were formally defined by the percentage of different blood they carried – American, African, and European – in reality it was social criteria, not biological, that defined the different groups. Undoubtedly, a large number of racial mestizos who were born and grew up in Indian communities were considered Indians. In the same way, many racially pure Indians passed for Mestizos when they left their communities of origin and became serfs or free laborers. Some mestizos were taken for creoles, and the passage from one group to the other had less to do with relative "purity of blood" than with other social factors, among which wealth was especially important.

After the successful Mexican War of Independence in 1821, "ethnic inequality continued, as the criollos, i.e. persons of Spanish descent born in the Americas, became the dominant group of the new nation." At the time, a minority of the country spoke Spanish, yet it was established as "the official language of the nation." Citizenship in Mexico became "synonymous with Western culture and thus excluded Indians, Blacks, and other non-European groups unless they renounced their supposedly 'backward' and 'inferior' cultures." Through the implementation of these homogenizing practices, "criollos hoped that the majority of Indians and Blacks in Mexico would eventually be dissolved by European immigrants and the nation would be adequately whitened." The criollo elite of the new Mexican nation also instituted a widespread land grab of Indigenous territory throughout the country. While during the Spanish colonial period, the government had "recognized the collective property of Indigenous communities, since it was interested in extracting the surplus produced by Indian peasants," following independence, "individual property became the only legally recognized form of land tenure, according to the supposedly universal principle of Liberal individualism, and therefore Indigenous communities thus lost legal title to their holdings."

The Mexican government "used armed force to suppress Indian resistance, and in cases where it was successful, Indian lands were distributed and their communities were destroyed." In the 1820s, the government instituted a General Colonization Law which "paid non-Indians to take up residence in Indian country and work the land... based on the assumption that Indians would recognize and choose to emulate the virtues of 'civilization' once they had been exposed to them." This method was implemented throughout the entire country. When armed force and colonization failed, "the Mexican government used a policy of deportation from tribal homelands to other parts of Mexico." While these methods were devastating to maintaining the identities and communities of Indigenous peoples in Mexico, "it was not governmental policy that led to the detribalization and assimilation of most Mexican Indians." While "some Indian communities were able to maintain their existence, most were broken up as hundreds of Indians were slowly forced off their land and into Mexican towns, mining communities, and ranches as laborers."

In 1883, the Mexican government passed the Land Law Act, which "affected thousands of small-scale and detribalized Indian communities", as noted by legal scholar Martha Menchaca. A few years after the law's passage, which required "all public lands be surveyed for the purpose of development", the ruling class of Mexico and foreign corporations owned approximately "one-fifth of Mexico's total land mass, or 68 million acres of land". Once the land was "surveyed", "Mexican farmers had to prove legal ownership" and the courts often "upheld the corporations' surveys", which caused "many poor farmers... to migrate north into Texas, a task made easier by the railroad infrastructure." The Lerdo Law of 1856, which planned to provide "each family... part of the tribe's communal holdings" through privatization, had "stripped the tribal councils of their legal authority over their community's land", and since Benito Juárez died in the midst of its implementation, judges now "held the power to interpret property law and decide to support the surveying companies or recognize that the Lerdo Law had been improperly executed." As a result, "Indians who heeded President Juárez's orders and privatized their holdings but failed to disband their tribal councils could argue in court that although they were not given deeds, the Spanish land grant titles [from the colonial period] were still valid since they were not detribalized communities." On the other hand, "Indians who had disbanded their councils had no legal recourse because they were detribalized Indians." In the latter case, if detribalized peoples "managed not to get evicted from their lands, the main option left was to remain in their homes and become tenant farmers." However, many people "chose to join the northern migration" and "some detribalized Indians began a journey that would eventually transform them into U.S. citizens" as a result.

By the end of the nineteenth century, well-over 100,000 Mexicans had migrated north into the southwestern United States, both as a result of the Mexican government's land theft through the Land Law Act and the labor shortage in the United States following the Chinese Exclusion Act of 1882 and the unofficial "Gentlemen's Agreement" with Japan in 1907. As a result, many employers in the southwest opened contracting opportunities in border cities such as El Paso, Texas. Although the official U.S. immigration policy at the time prohibited contractual labor outside the United States, employers hired agents to travel to the interior of Mexico and convince rural and urban Mexican citizens that high wages and new job opportunities were available in the United States. Following the loss of land, low wages, and instability throughout the Mexican countryside, many poor Mexican people, particularly from the states of Jalisco, Guanajuato, Zacatecas, and Michoacán, migrated north to initially become railroad workers, laying track for low pay. A 1909 report concluded that Mexican laborers did the majority of the railway work in Nevada, New Mexico, Arizona, and southern California. Following the railway work, the majority of Mexican laborers were employed in the agricultural sector, working on cotton fields in Texas, sugar beet farms in northern Colorado, and citrus orchards in California, as well as mines throughout the southwest. By 1920, the number of Mexican immigrants in the United States was over 222,000, the majority of whom had previously been made landless by the Mexican government or worked on rural ranches.

This massive land grab in the nineteenth century soon sparked a series of peasant revolts throughout Mexico "from the 1840s to the Mexican revolution of 1910". Scholar Florencia Mallon has proposed that, in response, Indigenous communities developed "their own popular Liberalism, one that recognized communal institutions and property, and that defined citizenship in terms that did not exclude culturally different groups." In the latter half of the nineteenth century and early twentieth century, with the increasing development of the national capitalist economy and industrialization, "Indigenous communities were forced to migrate to the cities" and "large farms". As a result of that process, many became detribalized as they "adopted Spanish as their main language and abandoned their traditional sense of ethnic identity, shifting their allegiance to the national identity being constructed by the [Mexican] state." It was in this process that "entire [Indigenous] communities also changed their language, and their ethnic self-identification, from Indian to Mestizo." This is reflective in statistics of the era. While in 1808, Indians and Mestizos were estimated to comprise 60% and 23% of the population respectively, by 1885 this was 38% and 43%, and by 1921 this was 29% and 59%. From 1808 to 1921, it is estimated that approximately 3 million people experienced this cultural and ethnic transformation from Indian to Mestizo, which was about 1/3rd or 1/4th of the entire population of the country at the time.

In the midst of this detribalization and de-Indianization process in Mexico, the nationalist ideology of "mestizaje" was formulated "by intellectuals closely linked to the State" in the late nineteenth century. The Mexican government instituted national policies "aimed at achieving the racial and cultural homogenization of the population under the Mestizo category." Mexican nationalist ideologies now asserted that the country was a "mestizo society" which harmoniously combined the cultures of Indigenous peoples and Europeans. In reality, while the majority of "popular classes and sectors", including traditional rural communities and urban barrios, neighborhoods, and towns throughout Mexico, had "Indian origins" which were "often very recent", the "upper-class sectors" were "derived more or less directly from the Spanish colonizers" and tended "to conserve non-Indian cultural forms". Through mestizaje and Indigenismo, mestizos were "supposed to be proud of their Indian 'past', embodied in the massive constructions and the works of art of their Pre-Columbian 'ancestors', while embracing the forward-looking and Modern culture of the White races of the world" – "a process of whitening the Indians, but not of darkening the Whites." Throughout the twentieth century, there remained a concerted effort by the Mexican government to integrate Indigenous people into Mestizo society. This was implemented through Indigenista policies which were meant to "foster the dissolution" of Indigenous ethnic identities through Westernization. Indigenismo has since been criticized as "openly paternalistic".

In contemporary Mexico, "many [Indigenous] cultural traits" continue "to be present in a de-Indianized collectivity". Bonfil Batalla demonstrates this by examining the comparisons between poor rural and urban mestizos and Indigenous peoples of Mexico. Following centuries of colonialism, diverse circumstances were now present: "In some areas, Indian enclaves have survived, while in others the original population was annihilated, expelled, or de-Indianized." Bonfil Batalla acknowledges the diversity of Indigenous cultures in Mexico while destabilizing the lines between "mestizo" and "Indian" by focusing on their cultural similarities and referring to them as non-monolithic categories. While acknowledging the diversity of "mestizo" and "Indian" realities, Bonfil Batalla also emphasizes the "fundamental, determining characteristics" present throughout Mesoamerican cultures to demonstrate how there is an "effective presence of that which is Indian... in almost every social and cultural aspect of the country", that "the presence of Indian culture is, in some aspects, so commonplace and omnipresent that one rarely stops to think about its profound significance, or about the long historical process that made possible its persistence in social sectors that assume a non-Indian identity today."

Members of the privileged elite classes in contemporary Mexico, who are largely descendants of European colonizers have been noted to still regard "anything that is Indian, any trait that recalls the original ancestry of Mexican culture and society" as backward, grotesque, and inferior, by using derogatory and racist language such as "naco". There remains "many Mestizos living in traditional peasant communities whose culture is closer to that of the Indigenous peoples than to that of the modernized urban elites, despite the fact that they no longer speak an Indian language." This segment of the population "could very well 're-Indianze' itself" and in many communities throughout Mexico "such processes of re-Indianization are already well under way." In 2000, the ethnic composition of Mexico was recorded as 18% Amerindian, 10.5% of which openly identified as detribalized. There is also evidence that increasing numbers of the detribalized Mexican population may be openly identifying as Indigenous, given the rapid increase in population size in recent national census figures.

==== Peru ====
De-Indianization has been cited as an essential element to the formation of the colonial Peruvian nation-state, "which was and in many ways continues to premised on the overcoming of indigeneity, that is to say on the de-Indianization of Peru." Indigenous peoples in Peru could therefore be "redeemed" through the process of de-Indianization or assimilation into the colonial order of Western "progress". De-Indianization was implemented through various efforts of the state, such as through "education", yet "those who did not de-Indianize, because they refused to do so or because resources to implement the process of de-Indianization were lacking, could be, and indeed came to be seen as in need of being, erased from the purview of the nation-state. This historical marginalization of the indigenous, in this sense, is best understood not as a lack of or failure of the Peruvian nation-state, but as its necessary and constitutive condition."

==== United States ====
===== Upper South and Northeastern =====
In the seventeenth century, detribalization was implemented against Indigenous communities in the upper South region of the Thirteen Colonies in order to strengthen the position of the colonists. As historian Helen C. Rountree documents, systemic efforts were made "to detribalize the Powhatans" of Virginia, and various methods were implemented to "civilize" them and otherwise incorporate detribalized persons into colonial society. Until 1691, detribalized Indigenous people could "enter the middle- or lower- levels of [colonial] society" through interracial marriage. Following the prohibition of interracial marriage, "Indians were expected to join the lowest, non-white ranks." There is evidence that an Indigenous person who was perceived as detribalized had greater claims to land rights, exemplified via the case of Edward Gunstocker, whose land rights were perceived as valid by American colonial courts because he was detribalized.

By the second half of the seventeenth century, the colonists in the Virginia Colony attempted to "convert the Powhatans culturally" through permitting them to engage in a form of paid labor under the watchful eyes of white employers with the intention of "civilizing them and making them Christians." Indigenous children were taken from parents to become "servants" for colonists, who assured their parents that they would be treated well and not as slaves. However, as noted by Rountree, the colonists "did not draw a clear distinction between 'servants' (i.e., domestic employees) and slaves, either for Indians or for Africans." While few Indigenous people accepted these offers willingly in the early part of the seventeenth century, pressures from colonists increased, especially after Indigenous people were progressively impoverished following the stealing of land and effects of the emerging colonial economic system.

Detribalization was also used by the state governments in the northeastern region of Connecticut, Massachusetts, and Rhode Island in the nineteenth century to refer to the deliberate process of terminating relationships between Indigenous peoples and their Indian nations in the debate over federal recognition. At the time, the process of detribalization "carried the notion of 'liberating' Indians from the perceived shackles of tribalism."

In 1889, the state of New York published a report of a "special committee" of the legislature. It was based on having "asked for a solution of the 'Indian problem' from men living in nearly every section of the state." In answer to the question "What can be done for the good of the Indian?" relating to the Onondaga in western New York, the consensus was determined as follows: "exterminate the tribe and preserve the individual; make citizens of them and divide their lands in severalty." Chancellor of Syracuse University Charles N. Sims replied: "Obliterate the whole tribe; make them citizens; divide all the lands among them and put them under the laws of citizenship in the State. It is the merest farce in the world to treat them as a nation." Dr. Johnathan Kneelant of Syracuse, who was for several years a physician to the tribe, said: "I have recommended that they be detribalized and made citizens." Much of the responses throughout the report indicate similar attitudes toward various Indigenous nations throughout the state. This rhetoric indicates how detribalization was perceived as unquestionably necessary for the progress of the American settler colony by descendants of colonizers.

===== Southwestern =====
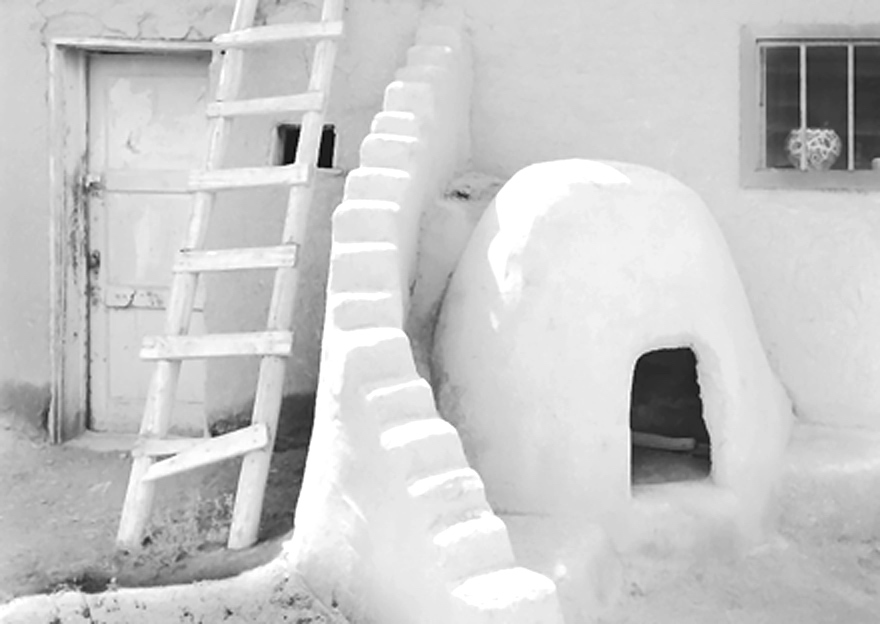
Taos Pueblo in New Mexico.

The Spanish colonial period began under Jose de Oñate in 1598, who inflicted atrocities on Acoma Pueblo, killing "hundreds of Acomas, and burned houses and kivas." Ongoing resistance by Pueblo religious leaders propelled the Spanish to use missionaries in order to "convert the Indians to Catholicism" and thus encourage them to disidentify from their Pueblo community and cultural practices. Historians Deborah Lawrence and Jon Lawrence note that a new "form of slavery developed whereby Indians who were obtained by Hispanics through war or trade were taken into Spanish households as servants." These "detribalized Indian captives" were referred to as genízaros and eventually "managed to merge into the larger society over generations."

In the eighteenth century, the population of detribalized people in New Mexico increased, particularly of the genízaros, who were now commonly held in servitude throughout before being released upon Christianization or adulthood. This increase was largely due to the prevailing "trade of human captives" which was carried out throughout the region. As noted by historian Lisbeth Haas, the Spanish had "granted genízaros and lower-status settlers land throughout the eighteenth century in order to create buffer zones between nomadic raiding and the colonial towns, including those of Pueblo Indians, such as Santo Domingo and Ysleta." Neighboring tribes including the Navajo and Comanche participated in the servant and slave trade of detribalized people and others at trade fairs in Abiquiu and Taos Pueblo until the mid-nineteenth century.

Following the Mexican-American War and the ratification of the Treaty of Guadalupe, the U.S. government quickly violated its agreement and failed to acknowledge the citizenship stipulation it had agreed to under the treaty. As noted by scholar Martha Menchaca, the U.S. government instead began a process of racialization which ascribed to Mexicans different legal rights on the basis of race." While "Mexicans who were white were given full citizenship," mestizos, Christianized Indians, and afromexicanos (mixed race people of African descent) were accorded inferior legal rights." While prior to the Mexican-American War, "Mexico had extended citizenship to all people living in Mexican territory irrespective of race," including the "right to vote, run for office, enter any profession, transact business with whomever one chose, marry freely with no racial restrictions, and obtain title to land grants," following American occupation, a new racial system was imposed upon the conquered territories of the Southwest.

The federal government provided the various state governments of the ceded territories "the right to decide which Mexicans would be given citizenship." In Texas, citizenship was only extended to Mexicans "as long as they were not of black descent." At the same time, "detribalized Christian Indians who paid taxes and had adopted the lifestyle of Mexicans were also given citizenship but with limited rights," being excluded from the right to vote, and conditional property rights, only "if they could prove that they spoke Spanish and that their ancestors had been legally emancipated from the Spanish missions." However, while the Mexican-controlled New Mexico legislature (which had authority over the territory of Arizona at the time) "extended citizenship to all former citizens of Mexico" in 1851, the United States congress quickly "rescinded this decree" and denied Black and Indigenous people citizenship in 1853. Soon after Arizona was established as a separate entity in 1863, "its first legislative assembly voted to reserve citizenship for white males." When deciding whether to grant Mexicans of mestizo ancestry rights afforded to white or Indigenous peoples, "most government officials argued that Mexicans of predominately Indian descent should be extended the same legal status as the detribalized American Indians." Anglo-American legislatures disenfranchised many Mexican people throughout the Southwest by arguing that they were of Indigenous descent and should therefore not be granted the rights and privileges of white American citizens.

People of Indigenous descent were also discriminated against based on their affiliations, as "Spanish-speaking mestizos who resided in the main colonial towns" were "assumed to be Mexican," making them "exempt from Indian policies." Indigenous groups who managed to not be displaced or "subdued by the Spanish and Mexican governments were placed on reservations or forcibly driven out of the Southwest" by American settlers and the military. If any Indigenous people refused to submit to the American occupiers, they would be "politically-labeled [as] warlike" which could serve as a justification for their imprisonment or military attack by state forces. Those groups who were considered peaceful "were visited by an agent of the Bureau of Indian Affairs (BIA) to determine if they should be extended the legal rights of Mexican mestizos" in central colonial settlements. Ultimately, the BIA granted these rights to "the Coahuiltecan and Apache in Texas, the Pueblos in New Mexico, Pima Indians of the Santa Cruz and San Pedro valleys in Arizona, and Chumash, Gabrieleño, Luiseño, and groups of Yuma Indians in California."

Once the legislature had made their decisions, many Indian villages were relocated onto reservations and some were allowed to remain in their village with their property respected (e.g. the Pueblo), but the majority had their lands confiscated and were forced to move. Individuals who were detribalized and lived among the Mexicans but were culturally identifiable as Indian were ordered by the federal government to be counted among the peaceful Indian populations.... The legislatures were given the power to determine if detribalized Indians were to be granted the political rights of Mexican mestizos.

Aside from the Pueblos of New Mexico, "most Indians living in former Mexican municipalities lost their property to the U.S. government." Those who were classified as Mexican under American occupation also "did not have to fear being placed on reservations or being subject to punitive laws like those passed in some states." As a result, this issue of being identified as either Indian or Mexican by the American government was important; "whereas Indians benefited from being legally classified as Mexican, it was politically dangerous for Mexicans to be considered Indian."

=== In Asia ===
==== Central Asia ====
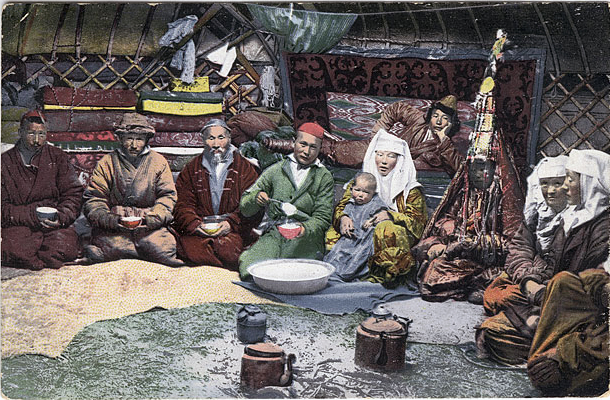
Kazakh family inside a yurt, 1911/1914

In the latter half of the nineteenth century, the Russian Empire began colonizing the Central Asian steppe and the nomadic Indigenous Kazakhs of the region. With the "final Tsarist conquest of the 'Kazakh' steppe, and the abolishment of serfdom in the Empire in 1861," the scale of "Russian peasant migration into northern Central Asia increased dramatically." Newly emancipated Russian and Ukrainian Slavic serfs sought territory in Siberia and Central Asia in hopes "of acquiring a free plot of land" to escape their previous condition of "extreme poverty and starvation." Upper class Tsarist officials sought to prevent this migration, "concerned with a possible decrease in the labour force in European Russia," but did so with little success. By the 1890s, in order to alleviate "rising peasant unrest" in European Russian cities such as St. Petersburg, officials encouraged "hundreds of thousands of Slavic peasants to resettle in Central Asia, especially on the territories of present-day Kazakhstan and Kyrgyzstan."

In the 1890s and early 1900s, the Russian Empire sent "several government commissions" to survey the "quantity of arable land" for "prospective settlers," which concluded that "the steppe nomads possessed surplus land, which could be allocated to Slavic settlers." The "appropriation of 'Kazakh' surplus land" was perceived by officials as "legally justifiable" following "the 'Kazakh' Khans submission to the Russian throne" which transferred control over their land to "the property of the Russian monarch." The migration of Slavic settlers into Central Asia peaked between 1906 and 1912, "when approximately 1.5 million new Slav migrants poured into the region." By 1916, it was estimated that there were 3 million European settlers in the region. Since settlers were privileged by the Russian Empire, they were "given larger and more fertile tracts of land" while "farming plots allocated to [Kazakhs] were often useless for cultivation." The loss of access to the fertile lands was "a devastating blow to the 'Kazakh' nomadic economy" and forced many Kazakhs "to adapt to the sedentary lifestyle, or to move southward in search of new grazing lands for their herds."

However, "the sedentarization of some 'Kazakhs' ... did not always necessarily lead to their detribalization, since most of the newly established 'Kazakh' villages were settled by ex-nomads deriving from the same clan and tribal origin." As such, many Kazakhs were able to retain their immediate clan and tribal identities. At the same time, the "pan-horde identities," which had previously existed prior to Russian colonization, were "significantly weakened with the abolition of the hordes, since no alternative institution remained to sustain them." Overall, the influx of Slavic settlers changed "the demographic structure of the region," resulting in the "emergence of two broad and distinct cultural groups," the Slavic settlers who were "primarily followers of the Orthodox Christian faith" and the Muslim Kazakhs, which included both "pastoral nomads and newly sedentarized farmers" and the related Kyrgyz and Karakalpak ethnic groups, who were speakers of Kazakh dialects and "physically exhibit[ed] Mongoloid features."

Tsarist colonial policies "privileged the Slavic settlers over the steppe nomads" and segregated the Kazakhs, who along with other non-Christian steppe peoples were considered belonging to the so-called inorodtsy ["allogeneous"] category. This exacerbated sociocultural tensions between the two groups, as the Slav population became viewed as "agents of the Tsarist colonialism, and hence equally responsible for their socio-economic problems." These tensions and oppression by the Russian Empire eventually culminated in the 1916 revolt in Central Asia. Following the Russian Revolution in 1917, the Kazakhs were widely dispersed and had been "battered in the civil war" with the Slavic settlers which had preceded "the establishment of Bolshevik control." The "surviving clans, villages, and auls (migratory groups) reconstituted themselves as Soviets and tried to carry on as before," although new policies were quickly imposed upon them.

Similar to European colonial efforts in Africa, Soviet nationality policy initially "emphasized 'indigenization' of the institutions of local government." However, while in Africa, European powers instituted these policies to prevent working-class consciousness and to control the majority of Africans as peasant laborers for their empires, the fundamental purpose of Soviet indigenization policies were "precisely the opposite of the European policy of colonial indigenization in Africa." In this sense, "Soviet policy was not designed to preserve 'traditional' content, but to replace it." The goal was not to ensure that a "good Uzbek" remained a "good Uzbek," as European powers had believed of the "good African," but to "make him a good 'European' in the sense that Europeans were modern and most Uzbeks were not." As a result of this Soviet ideology toward the colonized peoples of Central Asia, "plenty of smashing of traditional institutions was done by the Soviet state in the name of socialist transformation," which resulted in detribalization.

This was done through education policies, which were implemented through a "universal Soviet curriculum" instituted in the same manner "regardless of the pupil's ethnic identity." The "economic and political logic" of this curriculum was to create "a loyal, modern, interchangeable population suitable for rapid industrial development." While colonial governmental policy in Africa did not seek to employ a "civilizing mission" for fear of creating an urbanized "detribalized" population of workers who may rebel against the colonial order, the Soviets attempted to "ultimately transform and integrate all peoples into one political community." Progress was notably perceived as slow by the Soviets in Central Asia, as "Stalinist authorities consistently bemoaned the slow process of working-class formation among the Central Asian peoples" and "relatively low numbers of Central Asians in institutions of higher education in the late 1930s and 1940s" was a "sore point for a regime preoccupied with training 'nationality cadres.'"

By the "mid-to-late 1930s," the Soviets had abandoned these nationality policies as a response to "Russian resentment and rising non-Russian nationalism, itself a consequence of the indigenization policies." This resulted in new policies which asserted "the reemergence of the Russians" and curtailed the usage of "non-Russian languages in administration" while simultaneously increasing "repression of ethnic diasporas and the adoption of mandatory Russian-language instruction," exemplifying how "new elements in Soviet nationality policy moved in the direction along the lines of its neighbors to the west" during the interwar period. Resistance to these new policies emerged "in Polish and German villages in Ukrainian and Belorussian border regions and [the Soviets] took violent measures against those communities," such as through "selective deportation targeting entire villages of Germans and Poles"; the "deportation of the Soviet Korean population to Central Asia would soon follow."

Following decades of Soviet control in the twentieth century, "the party had still failed to undermine indigenous religious and clan authority" throughout much of Central Asia. While other "Turkic nationalities emerged through a processes of detribalization [over centuries], the modern Kazakhs emerged instead through expansion and adaptation" under the weight of external authority.

=== In the Middle East ===
==== Jordan ====
The tribal groups of Transjordan were detribalized in the 20th century after Emir Abdallah, who was propelled to power via his alliance with the Allied, assumed control over the region. During the construction of the Hijaz Railway, "the tribes in the area refused to pay taxes or to contribute conscripts to the army, and at times, came out in open rebellion against central authorities." The alliance "brought political recognition" to Abdallah's regime and "helped in detribalization" of the region through colonial military control: "to centralize authority, Transjordan had to create a viable bureaucracy and army, build infrastructure, quell internal revolts, repel external aggression, and detribalize the desert."

==== Saudi Arabia ====
As an extension of European colonialism and Westernization, towns and urban centers in Saudi Arabia housed two different worlds, in which "the 'native' town exists alongside a 'Western' town." In former colonies throughout the greater Middle East, a second colonial city was often simply constructed next to the "old town" as part of the colonial order. Cities in Saudi Arabia such as Riyadh, Jeddah, and Dammam exemplified this type of colonial configuration in the 20th century. Westerners segregated themselves from those in the "native" town centers and lived together "in more or less discreet and hermetically sealed compounds." It was in this urbanized setting that "the modernization and individualization of Saudi society unfolded" at a rapid pace, which broke down "traditional social structures" and "served to detribalize society, to make the family cell its basic unit, and finally to split the family itself into conjugal micro-elements." The unification of Saudi Arabia, "was in every respect not only a victory of town over desert but a victory of the family over the tribe." The increasing "urbanization of Arabia therefore also corresponded to a sedentarization or detribalization of the nomads," accompanied by the Western family-centered model. Many nomadic families soon after became "detached from their tribal history and sense of belonging."

=== In Oceania ===
==== Australia ====
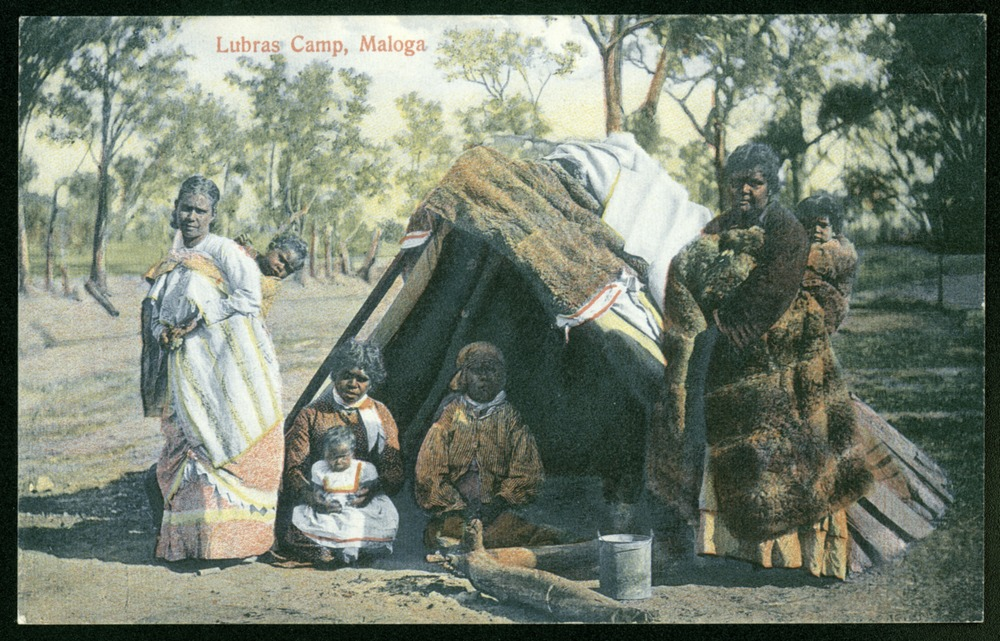
Postcard showing a group of Aboriginal women in European dress at Maloga Mission, Qld c.1900

In 1788, there was estimated to be approximately 251,000 Indigenous Australians (including Aboriginal Australians and Torres Strait Islander people) in what is now referred to in the Western context as Australia. By 1901, it was estimated that the population had declined to 67,000 as a result of European diseases, invasion and occupation. Indigenous groups which had survived were "either institutionalized on government or mission settlements or allowed to form camps on the fringes of upcountry towns, pastoral properties, farms, and mines, which were usually tucked away well out of sight of the busier centers of colonial life." By the 1880s, "the European populace became predominantly urban", which increasingly divided most European settlers from the Indigenous people.

Racist perceptions of the Indigenous people were rampant throughout the European Australian population by the end of the nineteenth century as "derision and contempt expressed in the mid-century years deepened toward a malevolent vilification". A member of the South Australian parliament who perceived "the detribalized Aborigines of Port Darwin in 1882 as 'degraded specimens of humanity... some less manlike than a griming and chattering monkey....' and questioned '...whether, on the whole, any beings bearing the semblance of humanity could be found more low-sunk than these...' may be bracketed with the member of the new Commonwealth Parliament in 1902 who said: 'There is no scientific evidence that [the Aboriginal] is a human being at all'".

In 1937, the Australian government held the first ever meeting of the state's leaders in "Aboriginal Affairs" in which they reportedly "recognized the needs of part-Aborigines but not those of the full bloods". They issued a recommendation "that 'half-castes', as they were called, should be educated for employment at white standards so as to facilitate their absorption into the Australian populace", while suggesting that people of "full blood" be "categorized as 'detribalized,' 'semicivilized,' and 'uncivilized'". Those who were categorized as "semicivilized" and "uncivilized" were deemed to be unfit for integration into colonial society without detribalization. For the "semicivilized" and "uncivilized", the Australian government "appeared to favor something like apartheid in inviolable reserves as an appropriate way of dealing with [them] but suggested that this should be done as far as possible without damage to the needs of employers of Aboriginal labor". Those deemed "uncivilized" were "to be left alone until progress had been made with the semicivilized and detribalized categories".

In the vicinity of such places of employment it is proposed to provide reserves where unemployed aborigines will be more or less maintained under tribal conditions by those in employment, and whither, during periods of unemployment, those who have been employed may retire. The purpose of these reserves is to provide the aborigines with the means of continuing their present state of existence—a semi-tribal life—but the ultimate intention is that they shall be brought under the same control as is now proposed for those who are regarded as detribalized. In the vicinity of the white settlements, it is proposed that the detribalized aborigines shall be educated and trained in various avocations, in which they can make a living without competing with the whites.

This practice was instituted with the underlying assumption "that Aboriginal culture had collapsed, or would soon do so everywhere, and that assimilation into a European mode of life was the one rational possibility". Australian colonial authorities believed the Indigenous population "should be trained for a settled life and useful occupation; taught to recognize authority, law, and the rights of property; given religious training to 'replace the stability of character which has been lost by the destruction of their ancient philosophy and moral code'". During this 1937 meeting, a resolution known as the Destiny of the Race was passed, which stated, that "this conference believes that the destiny of the natives of aboriginal origin, but not of the full blood, lies in their ultimate absorption by the people of the Commonwealth and it therefore recommends that all efforts be directed to that end".

Section 71 of the Welfare Ordinance 1953 stated that "a person who has the control or management of ward" shall not fail "to provide the ward with reasonable food, shelter, clothing, and facilities for hygiene". However, what was constituted as "reasonable" was "governed by delegated legislation and influenced by the ideology of assimilation". As a result, "reasonable" was meant to "inevitably reflect a nuclear family structure". This preference was made "evident in the reports of [Australian] Patrol Officers." Scholars have since argued that "assigning nuclear family names" was "a means of ‘detribalizing’ indigenous Australians at this time".

Until 1970, Indigenous Australian children were forcibly removed from their families and communities throughout Australia and became part of the Stolen Generations. In a 1980 study on European-Australian and Indigenous Australian relations in Western Australia, Kenneth Liberman reflects on how European-Australian settlers imposed their standards of "morality" onto Indigenous Australians, with "the implicit attitude that the best thing which European society could do for Aboriginals was to make Europeans of them". According to Australian anthropologist A. P. Elkin, "European society was endeavoring to turn Aboriginal people into individualists" by teaching them the "moral value of work". He notes how European-Australian pastoralists forced "Aboriginals living on their stations to perform some sort of token labor before they hand them their government social welfare check," viewed Indigenous children as undisciplined, and perceived their ownership over the land as justifiable based on their alleged superior morality. At the time, "the former national Minister of the Interior argued... that it was not only impossible to accept Aboriginal land claims but that it was 'wholly wrong'".

In a Ted Talk, Stolen Generations survivor Sheila Humphries spoke of being stolen from her parents, the torture and abuse by the nuns who managed the orphanage where she was detained, and the attempts by police officers and doctors to steal her own children from her years later: "My mother was taken, I was taken, they wanted to take my twins". In recalling her relationship to her mother, Humphries reflects on the disturbing realities of this era of Australian history which produced cross-generational detachment, trauma, and loss of familial and communal structures for Indigenous people:

I woke up one morning, two o'clock in the morning, sobbing my heart out, and my late husband said to me, "What's the matter?" All I could say to him at that time was, "I want my mommy. I want my mommy." He said, "I'll tell you what, [...] I'll take you back tomorrow and we'll go and visit her grave". So, we went back the next day, and it was like I was going to a funeral for the first time in my life. A mother whose name I didn't know, until 30 years later. I found out her real name. Mother darling had nine different names. She was placed in so many institutions, baptized into so many religions, and given so many names.

== Retribalization ==
Retribalization has been used as a term to contextualize the re-identification, reclamation, reconnection, and reintegration of "detribalized" persons with an Indigenous identity or community of ancestral origin. As many people throughout the world have been detached through the historical and contemporary efforts of colonizers and the effects of colonialism, the current role and relationship of detribalized peoples as they relate to their communities of origin is complex. Reconnection with Indigenous knowledge systems can be an important element "for Indigenous or detribalized people who were interrupted from the knowledge contained within" their culture(s) of origin.

Central to this relationship is protecting traditional ways of being, since "what distinguishes the Indigenous struggle for self-determination from others is their collective effort to protect the rights of their peoples to live in accordance with traditional ways." Indigenous communities simultaneously "resist the kind of essentialism that recognizes only one way of being" while also working "to retain a vast constellation of distinct traditions that serve as the defining characteristics of tribal life." Therefore, "regardless of how any individual Indigenous person chooses" to live their life, it is known in Indigenous communities that "they are responsible for protecting the right to live according to ancestral ways," since, according to scholars such as Vine Deloria Jr., it has been "the allegiance to traditional knowledge that has protected American Indians from annihilation and absorption in the democratic mainstream."

This connection to "tradition" determines that while the project of decolonization requires the histories and experiences of nontribal, detribalized, and "mixed-blood" peoples to be theorized as an integral part of the Indigenous diaspora, it must also operate to sustain and reinvigorate the life-ways of tribal peoples still among us. Particularly in this time when the dominant patterns of belief and practice are being widely recognized as integrally related to the cultural and ecological crises, the need for understanding and sustaining other cultural patterns is essential.

=== Chicanos and Mexican-Americans ===
Chicanos and Mexican-Americans who are "descendants of the original peoples," or Indigenous peoples of Mexico, have been described as belonging among "detribalized Indigenous peoples and communities." Chicano people, many of whom are mixed-race, have also been described as de-Indigenized as a result of their displacement from maiz-based cultures throughout the greater Mesoamerican region. Rather than existing as a "subculture" of American mainstream culture, Chicano culture has been positioned by Alicia Gasper de Alba as an "alter-Native culture, an Other American culture indigenous to the land base now known as the West and Southwest of the United States." While influenced by settler-imposed systems and structures, Chicano culture is referred to as "not immigrant but native, not foreign but colonized, not alien but different from the overarching hegemony of white America."

Gloria E. Anzaldúa has addressed detribalization, stating "In the case of Chicanos, being 'Mexican' is not a tribe. So in a sense Chicanos and Mexicans are 'detribalized'. We don't have tribal affiliations but neither do we have to carry ID cards establishing tribal affiliation." Anzaldúa also recognizes that "Chicanos, people of color, and 'whites'," have often chosen "to ignore the struggles of Native people even when it's right in our caras (faces)," expressing disdain for this "willful ignorance." She concludes that "though both 'detribalized urban mixed bloods' and Chicanas/os are recovering and reclaiming, this society is killing off urban mixed bloods through cultural genocide, by not allowing them equal opportunities for better jobs, schooling, and health care."

In regard to combating the effects of American mainstream culture on detribalized Indigenous and Chicano gender and sexuality constructs, Gabriel S. Estrada has discussed how "the overarching structures of capitalist white (hetero)sexism," including higher levels of criminalization directed toward Chicanos, has proliferated "further homophobia as Mexican Indian youth increasingly battle the myths and realities of rape by adopting hypermasculine personas that can include sexual violence directed at others." Not only does this constrict "the formation of a balanced Indigenous sexuality for anyone[,] but especially... for those who do identify themselves as gay, queer, joto, bisexual, [or] two-spiritied, [etc.]" to reject the "Judeo-Christian mandates against homosexuality that are not native to their own ways," recognizing that many precolonial Indigenous societies accepted homosexuality openly.

Roberto Cintli Rodríguez questions how and why "peoples who are clearly red or brown and undeniably Indigenous to this continent have allowed ourselves, historically, to be framed by bureaucrats and the courts, by politicians, scholars, and the media as alien, illegal, and less than human." Academic Inés Hernández-Ávila has reflected on the potential for Chicano people to reconnect with their ancestry as a source of power for creating global change: "The day each mestiza/mestizo truly searches for and finds her/his roots, respectfully and humbly, and furthermore validates those peoples who still maintain their identity as original peoples of this continent of America, North, Central, and South- on that day we will be radical and much more capable of transforming our world, our universe, and our lives."

=== Native Americans ===
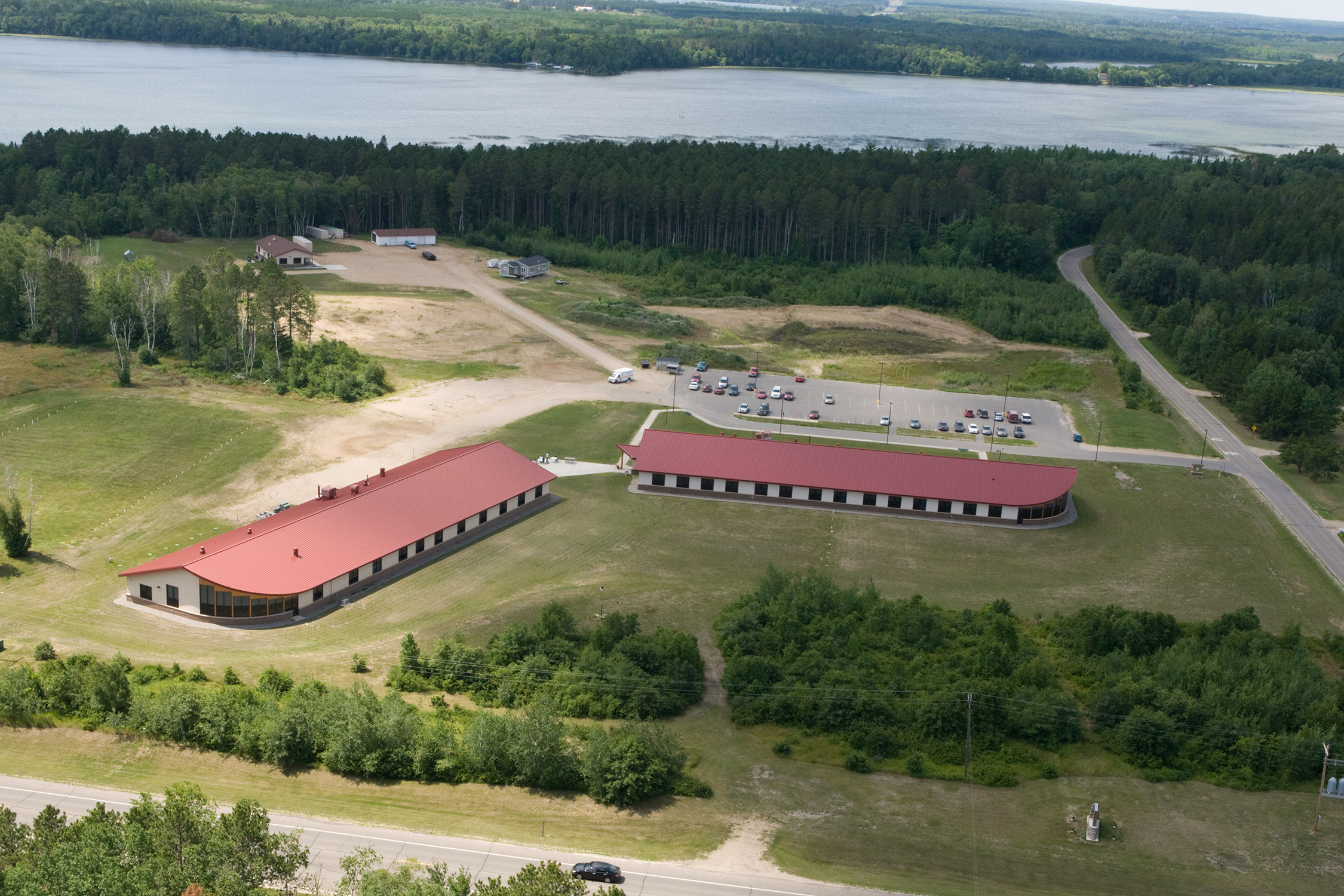
Leech Lake Tribal College

American Indian boarding schools, which were operational throughout the United States from the late nineteenth century until 1973, attempted to compel detribalization by forcibly instructing Indigenous children to abandon their "tribal languages and traditions," which resulted in cross-generational trauma and detachment from community; "detribalization was achieved in many ways like cutting the children's hair, giving them clothes typically worn by white people, forbidding them to speak their native language, giving them a new American name, and, most of all, requiring them to speak English only."

Since "the relationship between parents and children was often broken because of long separation" forced upon Indigenous families, so was the "transmission of cultural and traditional knowledge." However, while the boarding schools were undeniably detrimental to Native Americans, their efforts to assimilate and erase tribal identities through forced "education" were unfulfilled, since "instead of replacing their students' Indian identity with an American one as planned, the schools reinforced it while creating a pan-Indian identity alongside other tribal identities." The emergence of pan-Indianism as an effect of the off-reservation boarding schools unified Native American resistance to colonialism and served as an important "tool for future unity and cohesion among Indians."

Native Americans have since resisted further detribalization through the institution of tribal colleges and vocational education programs which do not adopt "an assimilationist or a detribalization approach" but rather function in encouraging "revitalization, as a retribalization process serving Indian communities and their members." Retribalization may function as a means of perpetuating "the development, and the revitalization of tribal linguistic and cultural specificities through educational programs." Education at tribal colleges has meant that Native Americans are able to retribalize by learning "about their culture and reacquire their tribal identity, which had been lost, repressed, or put aside" while also reconnecting with their communities of origin.

Urban Native Americans have been increasingly re-identifying with their nation(s) of origin as a form of empowerment and self-understanding. Transferring from a "generic" or pan-Indian identification to their tribal identification of origin encapsulates this process; In this instance, "Indian identity" may operate as a "necessary antecedent" to "tribal identity and involvement." It is common in "urban Indian communities" to take an ideological path "from anomie to community and from community to tribe." In this sense and in the contemporary context, "Indian people growing up in a city, always aware and respectful of tribal affiliation, may look first to a positive Indian identity, supported by connection with Indian organizations and community, and, from that base, move forward to a real connection with a tribe, often selecting among the several which comprise their heritage."

=== "Ethnic Fraud" controversy ===
In the United States, primarily white European Americans have claimed distant, usually, Cherokee ancestry, despite nonexistent, uncertain, or "thin" connections, sometimes via Cherokee heritage groups, which has been a subject of controversy. As scholar Kim TallBear notes, the tribal or ethnic groups which are often targeted by "race shifters" or "whites seeking Native American identity" are those which have acknowledged "histories of extensive 'admixture,' as geneticists would call it, with non-Native peoples," which has left these groups vulnerable "because 'Cherokeeness seems open to whiteness in ways that Navajoness [for example] does not. ... Cherokeeness is an ideal destination for race-shifting because the tribe has a history of cultural adoption, tribal exogamy, and relatively open standards of tribal citizenship.'" The "Cherokee princess" phenomenon exemplifies an aspect of this form of ethnic fraud. Lakota journalist Tim Giago has humorously reflected on this matter as follows:

Good heavens! We (Indians) have heard it so many times in our lives. A white man or woman approaches (this usually happens after I have given a speech) and says, "My great grandmother was a Cherokee princess." Never a Cherokee prince, but always a princess. I suppose that is because none of these descendants of royalty wish to admit that their great grandmothers had an affair with a Cherokee male. Heaven forbid that a nice young white lady would ever cast an eye about an Indian man.

Because of federally-imposed qualifications of tribal enrollment, in the form of blood-quantum laws, tribal citizenship since the 20th century has been complicated by "dominant cultural notions of race," which have "pushed or been pushed against tribal peoples' own ideas of belonging and citizenship." DNA tests or "genetic-ancestry tests" are increasingly becoming an issue for tribes as well. In 2010, several tribes reported at a "national tribal enrollment conference" that "they had received enrollment applications with commercially purchased genetic-ancestry test results included," despite the fact that "federally recognized tribes do not accept genetic-ancestry results as appropriate documentation for enrollment and do not advise applicants to submit such documentation."

Some individuals have used DNA tests in this manner to claim minority status in the United States for their own personal benefit. There is "anecdotal evidence" that some "applicants to Ivy League and other top-ranked schools who want an affirmative-action leg up in competitive admissions processes have used DNA tests to back up their personal decisions to self-identify as racial or ethnic minorities." In 2019, "contractors with white ancestry got $300 million" for claiming to be Cherokee despite nonexistent evidence supporting their claims. "12 of the 14 business owners involved claimed membership in one of three self-described Cherokee groups," the Northern Cherokee Nation, the Western Cherokee Nation of Arkansas and Missouri, and the Northern Cherokee Nation of the Old Louisiana Territory, all of which remain federally unrecognized and openly opposed by the Cherokee Nation and the Eastern Band of Cherokee Indians as fraudulent.

As a result, "tribal communities sometimes feel they are under assault by people with tenuous or nonexistent connections to their communities yet who want access to cultural knowledge or to cultural sites for personal identity exploration and sometimes for profit." Some have called for "a more 'decolonized' tribal enrollment based on social- and cultural-competence criteria (such as doing community service on reservations or in historic homelands; knowing the tribal history, culture, and politics; knowing the tribal language; taking an oath of allegiance to the tribal nation; and proving that one is of 'good character according to the tribe's traditional code of morality'), used alone or in conjunction with more liberal blood rules." However, these solutions have also been criticized by some as "overly idealistic" – "the fear is that the floodgates would fly open with the possibility of cultural conversion."

== See also ==
- Nation-building
- New tribalism
- Tribal sovereignty
- Modernization theory
- Detraditionalization
- Tribal knowledge
- Cultural assimilation of Native Americans
