= Lisbeth Haas =

American historian and anthropologist

Lisbeth Haas (born c. 1954) is an American historian and anthropologist. She is best known for her research into Indian and Hispanic societies in California and the Spanish colonial period. Much of her research centres on women, and she is the head of feminist studies at the University of California, Santa Cruz. In 1996, she published Conquests and Historical Identities in California, 1769-1936 under the University of California Press, which documents Californian history and ethnic identify in the period between Spanish colonization and the early twentieth century, with a particular focus on Chicano identity in the San Juan Capistrano and Santa Ana area of Orange County. In 2012, she published Saints and Citizens: Indigenous Histories of Colonial Missions and Mexican California, which involved research and analysis into indigenous paintings at various Californian missions, illustrating how "native painters incorporated their cultural iconography in mission painting and how leaders harnessed new knowledge for control in other ways".
