= Martha Menchaca =

American anthropologist

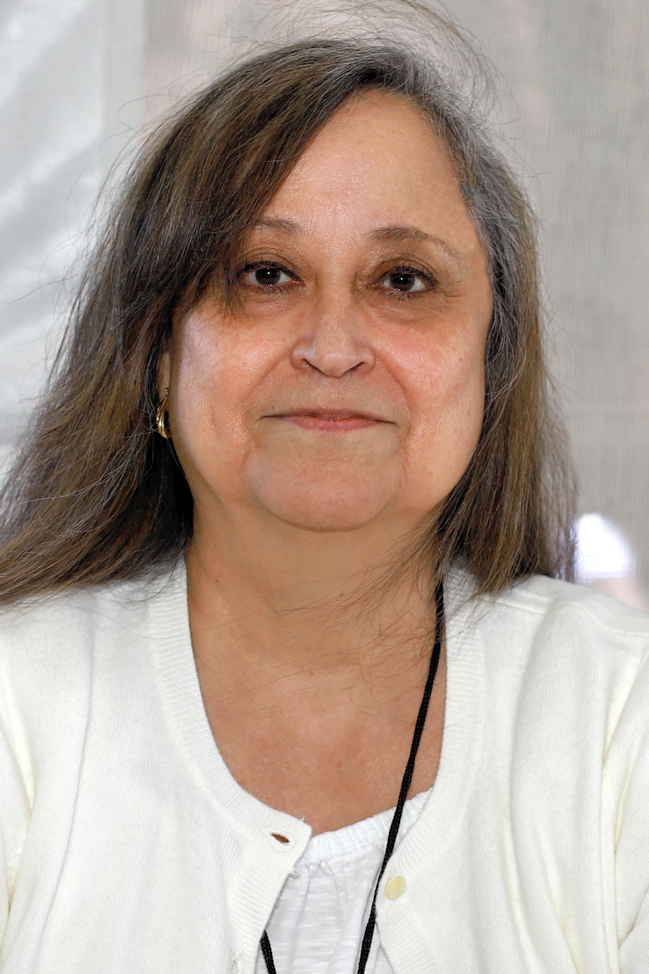
- Menchaca at the 2022 Texas Book Festival
- Education: Ph.D., Stanford University
- Occupation: Academic
- Known for: U.S./Mexican culture, immigration studies, legal anthropology, ethnicity

Martha Menchaca is an academic in the fields of social anthropology, ethnicity, gender, oral history, legal anthropology, immigration, and Chicana/o Studies on the relationship between U.S. and Mexican culture. Menchaca is recognized for her research on immigration, naturalization, and birthright citizenship. She is currently a professor at the University of Texas, Austin in the Department of Anthropology.

In 2019, Menchaca, along with professors Alberto A. Martinez, Jorge Cañizares-Esguerra, Emilio Zamora, Gloria Gonzalez-Lopez, Francisco Gonzalez-Lima, Fred Valdez, Jr., and John Moran Gonzalez, authored the Hispanic Equity Report, which demonstrated the violation of the equal employment opportunity clauses by UT Austin. Menchaca and others revealed how Hispanic Full Professors were paid approximately $25,342 less than White Full Professors, $10,647 less for Associate Professors, and $19,636 less for Assistant Professors while also receiving the lowest rates of promotion in the university, despite consistently being among the most published faculty.

== Publications ==
=== Articles ===
- "Anglo‐Saxon Ideologies in the 1920s‐1930s: Their Impact on the Segregation of Mexican Students in California." Anthropology & Education Quarterly, 1990, 21(3) w/ Richard R. Valencia
- "Chicano Indianism: a historical account of racial repression in the United States." American Ethnologist, 1993, 20(3)
- "The Anti-Miscegenation History of the American Southwest, 1837 To 1970: Transforming Racial Ideology into Law." Cultural Dynamics, 2008, 20(3).
- "The Social Climate of the Birthright Movement in the United States." Chicana/Latina Studies: The Journal of MALCS, 2013, 12(2)

=== Books ===
- The Mexican Outsiders: A Community History of Marginalization and Discrimination in California (University of Texas Press, 1995)
- Recovering History, Constructing Race - The Indian, Black, and White Roots of Mexican Americans (University of Texas Press, 2002)
- Naturalizing Mexican Immigrants: A Texas History (University of Texas Press, 2011)
- The Politics of Dependency: U.S. Reliance on Mexican Oil and Farm Labor (University of Texas Press, 2016)
- The Mexican American Experience in Texas: Citizenship, Segregation, and the Struggle for Equality (University of Texas Press, 2022)

=== Chapters ===
- "Segregation, desegregation, and integration of Chicano students: old and new realities." In Chicano School Failure and Success: Past, Present, and Future. Richard R. Valencia, ed. Pp. 81-131. (Routledge, 2004) w/ Richard R. Valencia and Rubén Donato
- "Latinos and the Mestizo Racial Heritage of Mexican Americans." In Companion to Latino Studies. Renato Rosaldo and Juan Flores, eds. Pp. 313-324. (Blackwell Press, 2007)
- "Early Racist Discourses: The Roots of Deficit Thinking." In The Evolution of Deficit Thinking: Educational Thought and Practice. Richard R. Valencia, ed. Pp. 13-40. (Routledge, 2012)

=== Lectures ===
- "Fronteras y Puentes: Understanding and Transforming Borders Through Social Science Research" (The University of Texas-Pan American, 2012)
