= Patrisia Gonzales =

Academic

- Education: Ph.D. Mass Communications, University of Wisconsin-Madison
- Occupation: Academic
- Known for: Indigenous studies, Chicano/a Studies, Latino/a Studies

Patrisia Gonzales is a traditional healer/midwife and professor of Mexican American Studies and American Indian Studies at the University of Arizona. Gonzales is a granddaughter of Kickapoo, Comanche, and Macehual peoples who migrated throughout the present-day United States and Mexico and has taught about the ways in which Indigenous medicine and Western health care can be complementary, both nationally and internationally. She was formerly a Distinguished Community Scholar at UCLA's César E. Chávez Department of Chicana and Chicano Studies and Regent’s Scholar at the University of California, San Diego. Gonzales was selected to teach visitors at the Dunbar Pavilion, an African American Arts and Culture Center in Tucson, Arizona, how to identify and incorporate plants into their health and wellness practices with funding from a Agnese Haury Program of Environment and Social Justice grant.

Gonzales worked for over ten years with colleague Roberto Cintli Rodríguez on a syndicated column entitled "Column of the Americas" and have many joint publications together. Gonzales and Rodriguez's work was jointly celebrated in 2014.

== Publications ==
=== Articles ===
- "The Language of Prayer: The Transformational Power of Native Languages," 2001, Ithaca, 8(1)
- "ANT MEDICINE: A Narrative Ecology," Chicana/Latina Studies, 2012, 11(2)
- "Calling our spirits back: Indigenous ways of diagnosing and treating soul sickness," Fourth World Journal, 2012, 11(2)

=== Books ===
- The Mud People (Chusma House, 2003)
- Red Medicine: Traditional Indigenous Rites of Birthing and Healing (University of Arizona Press, 2012)
- Traditional Indian Medicine: American Indian Wellness (Kendall Hunt Publishers, 2016)

=== Foreword ===
- Yolqui: A warrior summonsed from the spirit world by Roberto Cintli Rodríguez (University of Arizona Press, 2019)
