= Roberto Cintli Rodríguez =

Writer (died 2023)

- Born: Roberto Rodríguez; 1953 or 1954; Aguascalientes, Mexico
- Died: 31 July 2023 (aged 69); Mexico
- Education: Ph.D. Mass Communications, University of Wisconsin-Madison
- Occupation(s): Journalist, Columnist, Academic, Poet, Author
- Known for: Chicana/o studies, Indigenous studies

Roberto Cintli Rodríguez ( 1954 – 31 July 2023) was a Mexican-American journalist, columnist, poet, author, and academic of Mexican American Studies at the University of Arizona.

On 23 March 1979, Rodriguez was taking photos on the corner of Whittier Boulevard and McDonnell Avenue in East Los Angeles for Lowrider Magazine and captured the assault of an innocent man by members of the Los Angeles County Sheriff's Department. The last photo Rodriguez took was of a police officer pointing directly at him. Soon after, the officers attacked him, confiscated his camera and film, and beat him so badly that he spent three days in the Los Angeles County Hospital. While preparing to leave the hospital, Rodriguez was placed under arrest for allegedly assaulting the officers with a "deadly weapon."

Rodriguez suffered from post-traumatic stress disorder and lost the ability to dream in the aftermath of the incident. From 1979 to 1986, Rodriguez sought justice in court for this incident, which involved two trials; he eventually won his case, being awarded $205,000 by a jury, which he used to start a bilingual magazine. Rodriguez reported that he began to dream again 20 years following the event after drinking from a medicinal plant in Mexico. The fatal shooting of Michael Brown in 2014 inspired Rodriguez to retell his story and provide a platform for the stories of others who have suffered police brutality in Yolqui, a Warrior Summoned from the Spirit World: Testimonios on Violence (2019).

In 2020, Rodríguez, along professional demographer Jesus Garcia, Social Justice activist Ivette "Xochiyotl" Boyzo and other academic researchers, created La Raza Database Research Project La Raza Database Research Project which will be housed by the California State University, San Bernardino. The database tracks the murders of People of Color and the undercount of "Brown/Red/Indigenous" People by law enforcement.

Rodriguez supported students and spoke out at protests, governing board meetings, and other public hearings against the passing of Arizona House Bill 2281 led by Tom Horne, which banned the Mexican American Studies Department Programs and banned and confiscated books on Chicano and Indigenous People's history, critical race theory, and decoloniality in the Tucson Unified School District. He was arrested with local high school and college students the day the anti-Mexican-American studies legislation was signed into law. In response, Rodriguez stated that the ban was evidence that only "Greco-Roman Knowledge" was allowed in Arizona Schools and "that Indigenous peoples and Indigenous knowledge" have been "outlawed once again." Rodriguez was attacked by the far-right for his vocal support of the Mexican American Studies Department Programs, which included a threat on his life.

Rodríguez worked for over ten years with colleague Patrisia Gonzales, who he was married to for 19 years, on a syndicated column entitled "Column of the Americas" and have many joint publications together. Their work was jointly celebrated in 2014. Gonzales also authored the foreword of Rodríguez's 2019 book.

Rodríguez died from heart failure in Mexico, on 31 July 2023, at the age of 69. In the three years before his death, he lived in Teotihuacan. He was survived by Gonzales and five brothers.

== Publications ==
=== Articles ===
- "History of Red-Brown Journalism and Communications: Or the Art of Story-Telling," Revista canaria de estudios ingleses, 2011, 62
- "Arizona Criminalizes Indigenous Knowledge," Wíčazo Ša Review, 2013, 28(1)
- "'If There is No Struggle, There is No Progress': Transformative Youth Activism and the School of Ethnic Studies," The Urban Review, 2013, 45(1)

=== Books ===
- Justice: A Question of Race (Bilingual Review Press, 1997)
- Our Sacred Maíz Is Our Mother: Indigeneity and Belonging in the Americas (University of Arizona Press, 2014)
- Yolqui: A warrior summonsed from the spirit world (University of Arizona Press, 2019)

=== Lectures ===
- "Mexico, the Revolution and Beyond: The Mexican Revolution: 1810, 1910, 2010?" (Arizona State Museum, 2009)

=== Poems ===
- "That Indian Man You See On The Hospital Bed," in Poetry of Resistance: Voices for Social Justice (University of Arizona Press, 2016)

=== Research ===
- La Raza Database Research Project
